= Raj Narain =

Indian freedom fighter and politician (1917–1986)

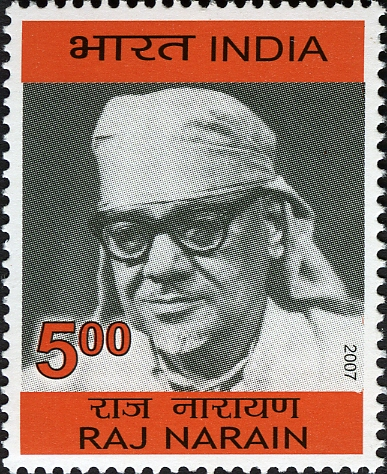
- Narain on a 2007 postage stamp of India

Union Minister of Health and Family Welfare
- In office 24 March 1977 – 25 January 1979
- Prime Minister: Morarji Desai
- Preceded by: Karan Singh
- Succeeded by: Rabi Ray

Member of Parliament, Lok Sabha
- In office 23 March 1977 – 22 August 1979
- Preceded by: Indira Gandhi
- Succeeded by: Indira Gandhi (vacated); Arun Nehru
- Constituency: Raebareli, Uttar Pradesh

Personal details
- Born: Raj Narain Singh; 23 November 1917 Motikot, Benares State, British India (present-day Uttar Pradesh, India)
- Died: 31 December 1986 (aged 69) New Delhi, Delhi, India
- Cause of death: Heart attack
- Children: 4
- Relatives: See Narayan dynasty
- Education: M.A.; LL.B.
- Alma mater: Banaras Hindu University
- Occupation: Politician

Raj Narain (23 November 1917 – 31 December 1986) was an Indian freedom fighter and politician. He won in a famous electoral malpractice case against the then Prime Minister Indira Gandhi, which led to her disqualification and, eventually, imposition of the 21-month Emergency in India from 1975. He defeated Gandhi during the 1977 Lok Sabha elections.

== Early life ==
Raj Narain was the son of Anant Prasad Singh and was born on 23 November 1917 in an affluent Bhumihar Brahmin family in the village Motikoat in Varanasi. He was related to the Narayan dynasty, who were the royal family of the Benares State. Narain was directly associated with the family of Maharaja Chet Singh and Maharaja Balwant Singh, who were the rulers of Benares State, over a century earlier. He was educated at Banaras Hindu University, and did M.A. and LL.B.

== Activities during India's Freedom Movement ==
As a Political and Social worker, he organised a school for adults, a girls school, a study centre and a labour organisation and became member of Congress Socialist Party, in 1934, and National Committee of Students Federation, 1939–44. He was President of the Banaras University Mandal Congress Committee and Member of District Congress Committee (D.C.C.).

He was president of Student Congress during the 1942 Quit India Movement, and led protests in and around Varanasi district in UP. Initially he was "underground" for three months and later arrested on 28 September 1942, during Quit India Movement and detained till 1945.

== Career after Independence ==
He was imprisoned 58 times for a period totalling about 15 years in connection with students' and socialist movements.

When India became independent, Raj Narain joined Socialist Party led by Acharya Narendra Deva, Jayprakash Narayan and Dr Rammanohar Lohia and held many party positions including Secretary of UP Socialist Party, 1948–51. He was very close to his Guru Acharya Narendra Deva and Rammanohar Lohia. Lohia described him as "a person who has the heart of a Lion and practices of Gandhi". Lohia admired him a lot and even said that "if in India there could be just three or four persons like him, dictatorship can never shadow the democracy".

He was elected to the Uttar Pradesh Legislative Assembly in 1952 and was Leader of Opposition in the Assembly until 1962. The parties he was affiliated with included CSP (1934–1948), Socialist Party (1948–1952), Praja Socialist Party (1952–1955), Socialist Party (1956–1964), Samyukta Socialist Party (1964–1972), Socialist Party (1971–1972), Socialist Party (Lohia) (1972–1974), Bharatiya Lok Dal, (1974–1977), Janata Party (1977–1979), Janata Party (Secular) (1979–1980), Democratic Socialist Party (1981–1983), Janata Party (1983–1984), and Socialist Party from 1984 till his death, in 1986. Party positions he held included, Member National Executive, PSP, 1954–1955, Chairman, Socialist Party, 1961–1964. He was also a member of the Rajya Sabha from 1966–1972 and 1974–1977.

Raj Narain opposed policies and practices of Prime Minister Indira Gandhi and stood (against her) in 1971 Lok Sabha elections from Rae Bareli as an Samyukta Socialist Party Candidate. Although he suffered a defeat from her in 1971 elections, he accused Indira Gandhi of corrupt electoral practices and filed an election petition against her.

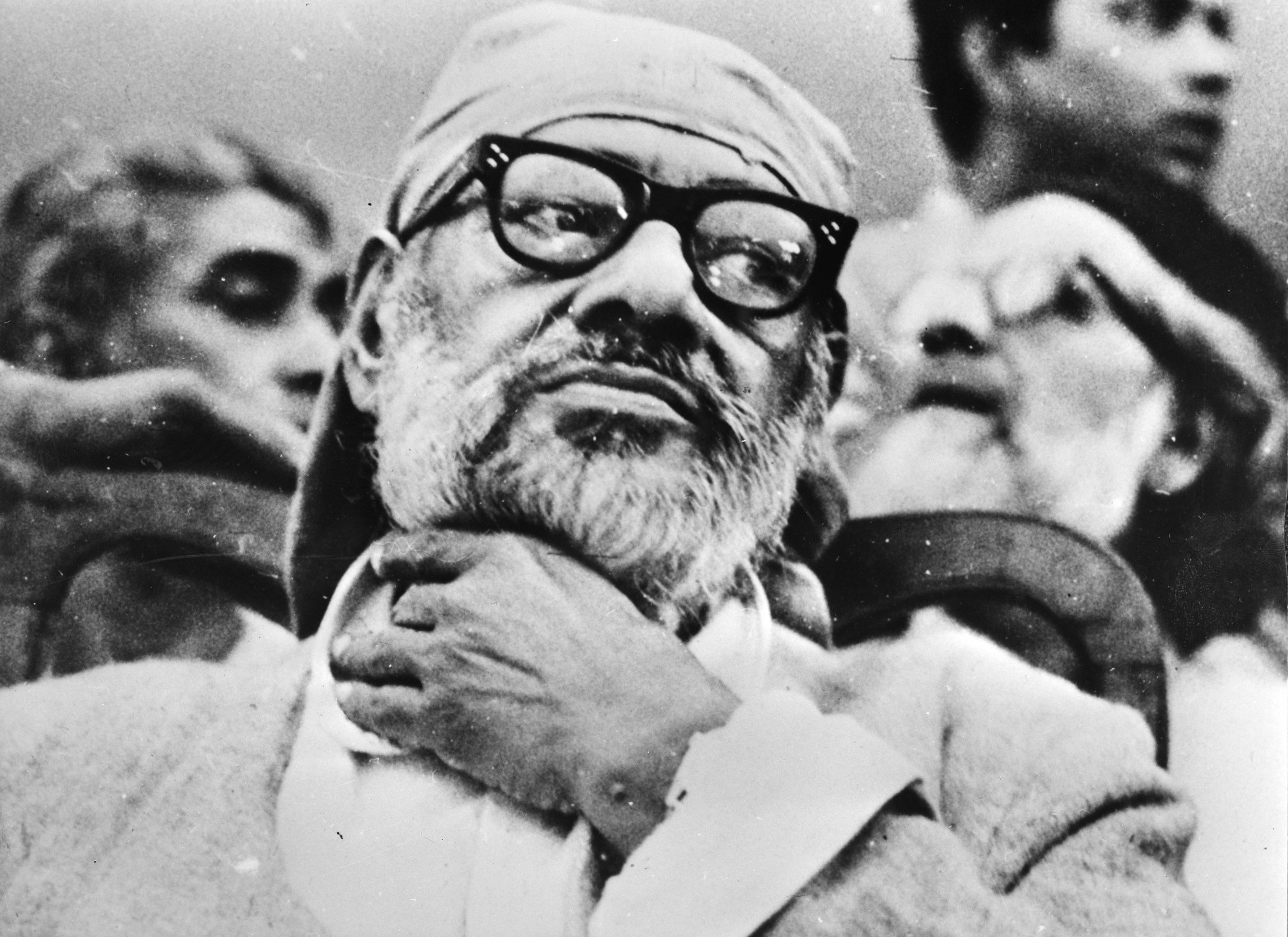
Raj Narain (1977)

The Allahabad High Court on 12 June 1975 upheld the accusations (Note: Indira was convicted of using the services of Yashpal Kapoor for election purposes while his resignation as a government servant was not yet accepted by the president.) and set aside the election of Indira Gandhi and also disqualified her to contest Lok Sabha election for next 6 years, which led to the imposition of Emergency in India. Nationwide protest started and the streets were flooded with people under the leadership of Loknayak Jai Prakash Narayan and Raj Narain. This was biggest drama of Indian politics after independence, with Raj Narain as one of the main protagonists.

Known as biggest critique and adversary of Indira Gandhi, upon imposition of Emergency, Raj Narain was immediately arrested and imprisoned on the same day, along with several leading opposition leaders including Jai Prakash Narayan, Morarji Desai, Satyendra Narayan Sinha, Charan Singh, L. K. Advani and Atal Bihari Vajpayee without any advance notice and confined mostly in undisclosed locations.

Mrs. Gandhi lifted the state of emergency in January 1977, dissolved Lok Sabha and arranged fresh elections to the body. Narain joined with other opposition parties to form the Janata alliance to face Mrs. Gandhi's Congress party. Narain once again stood against her from the Rae Bareli constituency. He defeated her with a margin of more than fifty thousand votes. The Janata alliance also swept the election throughout North India to form the majority in the parliament (Lok Sabha).

Narain reluctantly joined the Morarji Desai government and became Minister of Health and Family Welfare. Narain's stint as minister lasted just over a year when he and Charan Singh were asked to resign for criticising the Janata government.

Later on, he demanded that Janata Party members with ties to the Hindu Nationalist, RSS renounce those ties to avoid split loyalties. When this was ignored, he resigned from the party to float a new outfit called Janata Party (Secular). He was able to attract enough defectors from the former socialist and BLD factions to make the Morarji Desai government lose a vote of confidence in the parliament and lose power. Raj Narain's performance in the 1977–1979 Janata period has been described as that of Buffoon, practitioner of Guerilla theatre, and as a stalking horse for Charan Singh.

Raj Narain had earlier called himself Hanuman to Charan Singh's Ram. He lost the 1980 Lok Sabha election to Kamlapati Tripathi in Varanasi. Later he fell out with his mentor Charan Singh, and Raj Narain stood against Singh in the Baghpat constituency in 1984. At this time, in his opinion, his Ram turned in to a Ravan and had to be destroyed.

== Electoral history ==
- 1971 : Lost 1971 Lok Sabha election to Indira Gandhi from Rae Bareli
- 1977 : Defeated Indira Gandhi in Rae Bareli
- 1980 : Lost to Kamlapati Tripathi from Varanasi seat
- 1984 : Lost to Charan Singh from Baghpat seat. Congress was second in this seat.

== Political associations ==
- Congress Socialist Party (CSP), 1934–48.

Inspector of Congress Socialist Party, 1946. District Secretary, Congress Socialist Party (SP), 1946.

- Member Socialist Party (SP), 1948–52.

Secretary, Uttar Pradesh Socialist Party (SP), 1948–51. Convener, ‘Janvani Diwas’ of Socialist Party in Delhi, on 9 June 1951.

- Member Praja Socialist Party (PSP), 1952–1955.

Member National Executive, PSP, 1954–55.

- Member, Uttar Pradesh Legislative Assembly and First Leader of Opposition, 1952–1962.
- Member Socialist Party, 1956–64. (From 1 January 1956 to 9 June 1964) Chairman, Socialist Party, 1961–64.

Joined Samyukta Socialist Party (SSP) after the merger of PSP and SP.

- Member Samyukta Socialist Party (SSP), 1964–72. (9 June 1964 to 12, April 1972)

General Secretary Samyukta Socialist Party (SSP), 1964–66.

- Member Rajya Sabha, 1966–72. (For SSP)
- Member Socialist Party, 1971–72. (After the merger of PSP & SSP)

Revived Socialist Party (Lohia), in 1972 and was its Member, 1972–74. Merged SSP (Lohia) into BKD in 1974 and formed Bhartiya Lok Dal

- Member Bhartiya Lok Dal (BLD), 1974–77
- Member Rajya Sabha, 1974–77 (As BLD Candidate)

Formed Janata Party in 1977 after the merger of BLD, Bhartiya Jana sangh, Congress (O), Socialist Party and Congress for Democracy (CFD)

- Member Janata Party, 1977–79,
- Member 6th Lok Sabha, 1977–79. (Defeated Indira Gandhi in 1977)
- Member Union Cabinet as Health & Family Welfare Minister. (1977–78), removed from Union Cabinet in January 1979 and later on resigned from Janata Party in 1979. *Formed Janata Party (S) as its President and later as Chairman
- Joined Democratic Socialist Party, 1981–83 (With H. N. Bahuguna).
- Joined Janata Party, 1983–84. With Chandra Shekhar.

Contested against former Prime Minister Charan Singh, in 1984 Lok Sabha elections from Baghpat (U.P.) Formed Socialist Party in 1985, and was associated with this party till his death in 1986.

== Personal life ==
Raj Narain was married and had three sons and one daughter. Raj Narain published ‘Janmukh’-a weekly from Varanasi and has been on the editorial board of ‘Jan’ a monthly established by Dr Rammanohar Lohia. Raj Narain was the disciple of Siddha Mahayogi of Agra, Shri Siddh Gufa, Yogiraj Sadgurudev Shri Chandramohan ji Maharaj.He met his Gurudev during the time of emergency.

== Legacy ==
- A commemorative stamp was released on him by the former Vice-President of India, Bhairon Singh Shekhawat on 23 March 2007.
- In 2012, the then Chief Minister of Uttar Pradesh, Akhilesh Yadav unveiled a statue in his memory at Chandrabhanu Gupta Agriculture college which is close to the state capital Lucknow.

== Books ==
- Towards a new health policy, by Raj Narain. 1977-8 pages. POPLINE Document Number: 783545. Author: NARAIN R. Source citation: New Delhi, India, Department of Family Welfare, www.popline.org/ docs/ 0299/ 783545.html.
- Raj Narain's Heath policy mentioned in Practicing health for all, by David Morley, Jon E. Rohde, Glen Williams. Oxford University Press, 1983 – Medical – 333 pages.
- Raj Narain's Heath policy mentioned in India: health care patterns and planning, by Rais Akhtar. 2004-343 pages. On page no.45 Raj Narain, were ideologically inclined towards de-professionalization, decentralisation, and indigenous systems of medicine. The Janata party manifesto mentioned community health workers, and Raj Narain adopted it as a personal commitment (Leslie, 1985).

== See also ==
- State of Uttar Pradesh v. Raj Narain
