= Prabhu Narayan Singh =

Maharaja Bahadur of Benares from 1889–1931

Maharaja Sir Prabhu Narayan Singh GCSI GCIE
- Kashi Naresh
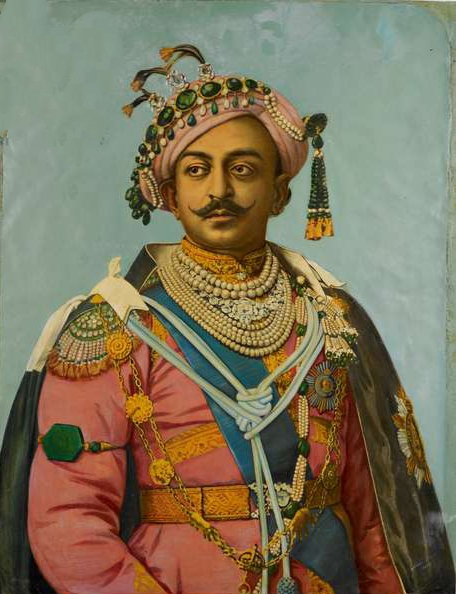

Maharaja Bahadur of Kashi
- Predecessor: Ishwari Prasad Narayan Singh
- Successor: Aditya Narayan Singh
- Born: 26 November 1855
- Died: 4 August 1931 (aged 75)
- Issue: Aditya Narayan Singh
- Dynasty: Narayan dynasty
- Religion: Hinduism
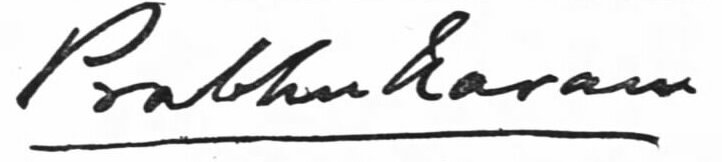
- Signature

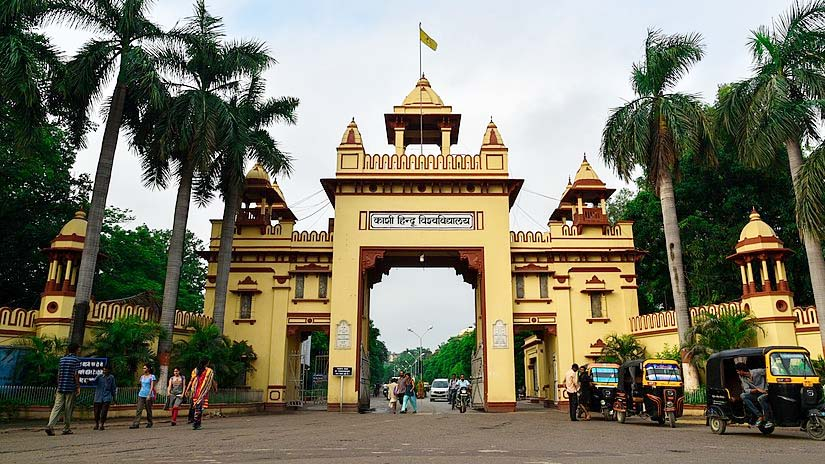
BHU

H.H Maharaja Sir Prabhu Narayan Singh GCSI GCIE KCIE (26 November 1855 – 4 August 1931) was Bhumihar who was the ruler of Benares State (Royal House of Benares), an Indian princely state, from 1889 to 1931. Prabhu Narayan Singh would reign for 42 years as Maharaja; in 1891, he was knighted with the KCIE, later becoming an honorary colonel in the Indian Army.

In 1911, he became the first Maharaja of the newly created princely state of Benares, including the parganas of Bhadohi and Keramnagar, Chakia, and Ramnagar, together with certain limited rights within the City of Benares. He was appointed Knight Commander of the Order of the Indian Empire (KCIE) in 1892, Knight Grand Commander of the Order of the Indian Empire (GCIE) in 1898, and Knight Grand Commander of the Order of the Star of India (GCSI) for his services in the First World War in the 1921 New Year Honours. He donated 1300 acres of land to establish famous Banaras Hindu University. He donated land at Kamacha, Varanasi to Dr. Annie Basent for the establishment of Hindu College which she donated for the establishment of BHU. He was a great scholar and well versed in Sanskrit, Persian, and English. Established Iswari Memorial Hospital for reducing mother-child mortality during childbirth. He died in 1931, aged 75, and was succeeded by his only son, Sir Aditya Narayan Singh.

== Titles ==
- 1855–1889: Maharaj Prabhu Narayan Singh
- 1889–1891: His Highness Maharajadhiraja Sri Prabhu Narayan Singh Sahib Bahadur, Kashi Naresh, Maharaja of Benares
- 1891–1898: His Highness Maharajadhiraja Sri Sir Prabhu Narayan Singh Sahib Bahadur, Kashi Naresh, Maharaja of Benares, KCIE
- 1898–1919: His Highness Maharajadhiraja Sri Sir Prabhu Narayan Singh Sahib Bahadur, Kashi Naresh, Maharaja of Benares, GCIE
- 1919–1921: Lieutenant-Colonel His Highness Maharajadhiraja Sri Sir Prabhu Narayan Singh Sahib Bahadur, Kashi Naresh, Maharaja of Benares, GCIE
- 1921–1931: Lieutenant-Colonel His Highness Maharajadhiraja Sri Sir Prabhu Narayan Singh Sahib Bahadur, Kashi Naresh, Maharaja of Benares, GCSI, GCIE

== Honours ==
- British India:
  - Knight Grand Commander of the Order of the Indian Empire (GCIE) – 1898 (KCIE – 1891)
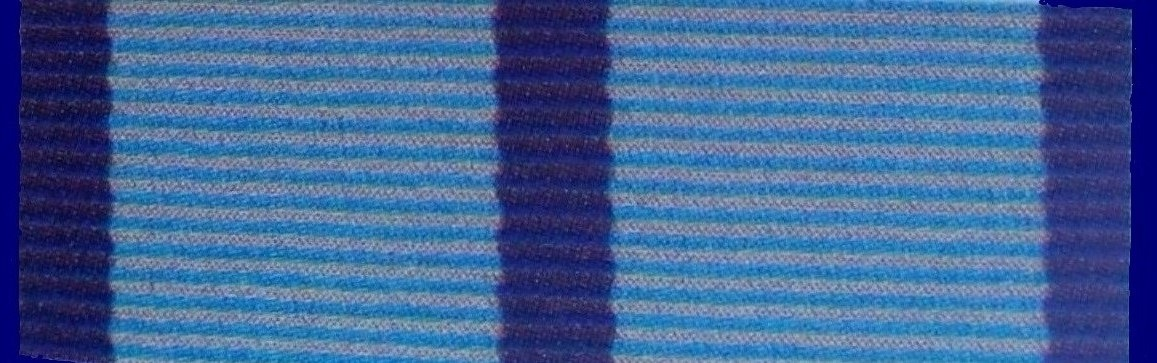
  - Delhi Durbar Gold Medal – 1903
  - Delhi Durbar Medal (1911) – 1911
  - Knight Grand Commander of the Order of the Star of India (GCSI) – 1921
- Belgium:
  - Grand Cross of the Order of Leopold II – 1926

== Footnotes ==
Preceded by Maharaja Ishwari Prasad Narayan Singh	Rulers of Benares State; 1889–1931	Succeeded by Maharaja Aditya Narayan Singh
