= Benares State =

Independent Bhumihar Kingdom, later princely state (1911–1948)

Coordinates: 25.282°N 82.9563°E

- 1740–1949
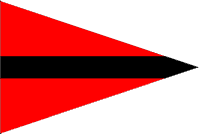
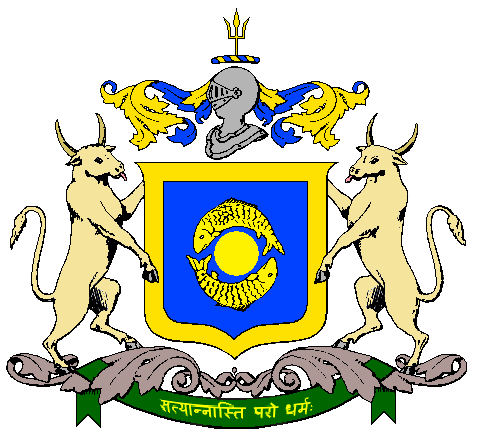
- Flag Coat of arms

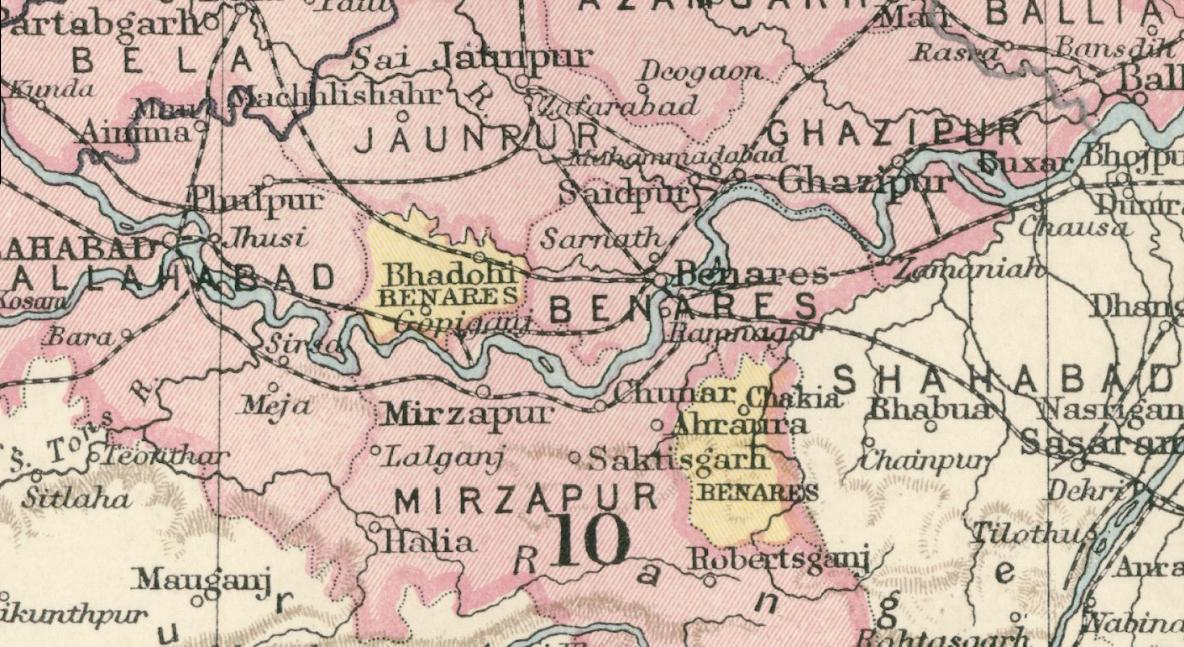
- Benares State in yellow in the Imperial Gazetteer of India; Benares city and Sarnath are in British India, which is shown in pink.
- Capital: Ramnagar, Benares
- Common languages: Bhojpuri, Hindi-Urdu, English
- Religion: Hinduism (official), Islam, Jainism, Buddhism, Christianity
- Maharaja Bahadur
  - 1740 – 1770 (first): Balwant Singh
  - 1939 – 1947 (last): Vibhuti Narayan Singh
- History
  - Established: 1740
  - Accession to the Union of India: 1949
Preceded by	Succeeded by
Oudh State	Dominion of India
- Today part of: Varanasi, Bhadohi, Chandauli, Mirzapur, Jaunpur, Ghazipur, Ballia, Sonbhadra, Azamgarh in Uttar Pradesh and Kaimur, Rohtas, Buxar, Bhojpur in Bihar, India

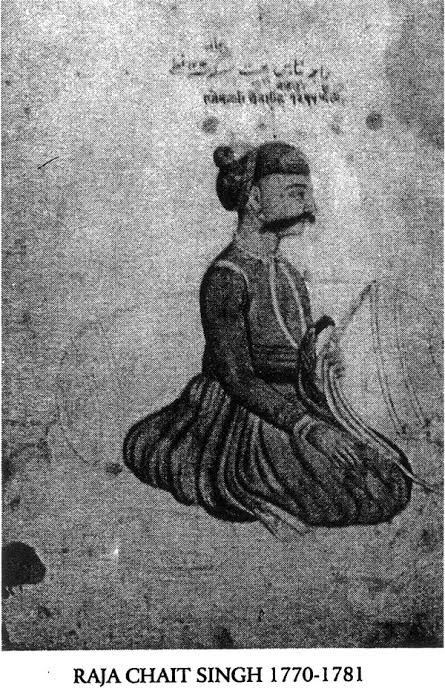
Raja Chait Singh of Benares State

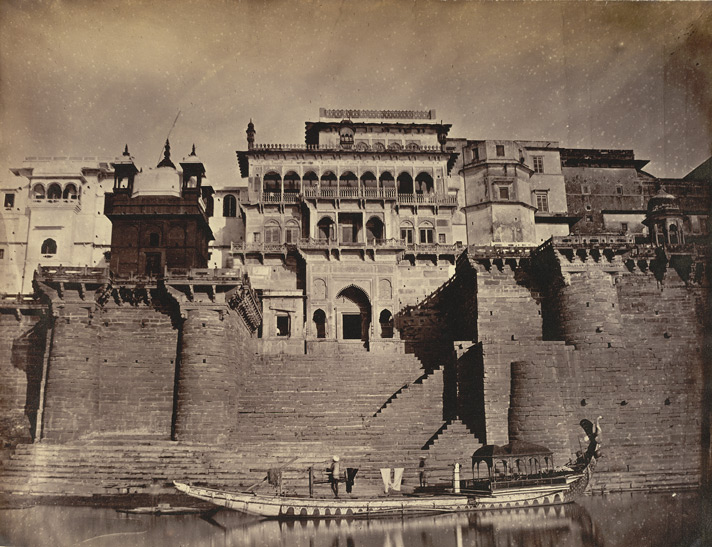
The Maharaja's Fort and palace in Ramnagar

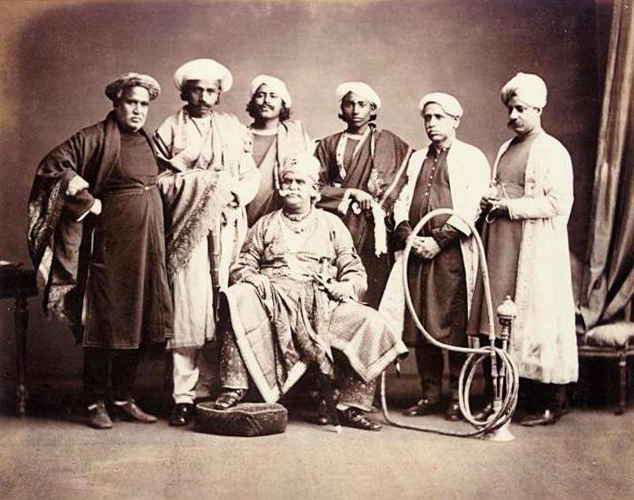
Maharaja of Benares with his courtiers in the 1870s

Benares State, earlier Benares Estate, was an estate or hereditary jagir and later a princely state, comprising the family domains of the Maharaja of Benares successively under the Nawabs of Oudh, East India Company rule, and the British Raj. From 1911 to 1948, it was recognized as a princely state.

The estate was founded by the zamindar, Balwant Singh, who assumed the title of "Raja of Benares" in the mid 18th century, taking advantage of the Mughal Empire's disintegration. His descendants had zamindari privileges in an area around Benares city, but not in the city, which the East India Company had annexed under the Treaty of Faizabad in the later 1760s. Benares became a princely state of the British Raj in 1911. On 15 October 1949, the State of Benares was acceded to the Dominion of India.

== History ==
=== Princely State ===
The earliest rulers of the later princely state of Benares were originally Zamindars for the Awadh province of the Mughal Empire who later became an independent state. Most of the area currently known as Varanasi was acquired by Mansa Ram, a zamindar of Utaria. Balwant Singh, the ruler of Utaria in 1737, took over the Jagirs of Jaunpur (except Bayalasi which was ruled independently by Zamindar of Purenw), Varanasi, and Chunar, in 1737 from the Mughal Emperor Muhammad Shah of Delhi. The Kingdom of Benaras started in this way during the Mughal dynasty. Other places under the kingship of Kashi Naresh were Chandauli, Gyanpur, Chakia, Latifshah, Mirzapur, Nandeshwar, Mint House and Vindhyachal.

As the Mughal suzerainty weakened, the Benares zamindari became Banaras State, thus Balwant Singh of the Narayan dynasty gained control of the territories and declared himself Maharaja of Benares in 1740. The strong clan organization on which they rested, brought success to the lesser known Hindu princes. There were as many as 100,000 Bhumihar clansmen backing the power of the Benares rajas in what later became the districts of Benares, Gorakhpur and Azamgarh. This proved a decisive advantage when the dynasty faced a rival and the nominal suzerain, the Nawab of Oudh, in the 1750s and the 1760s. An exhausting guerrilla war, waged by the Benares ruler against the Oudh camp, using his troops, forced the Nawab to withdraw his main force .This victory further strengthened the control over his domains.

Benares became a princely state in 1911. It was given the privilege of the 13-gun salute.

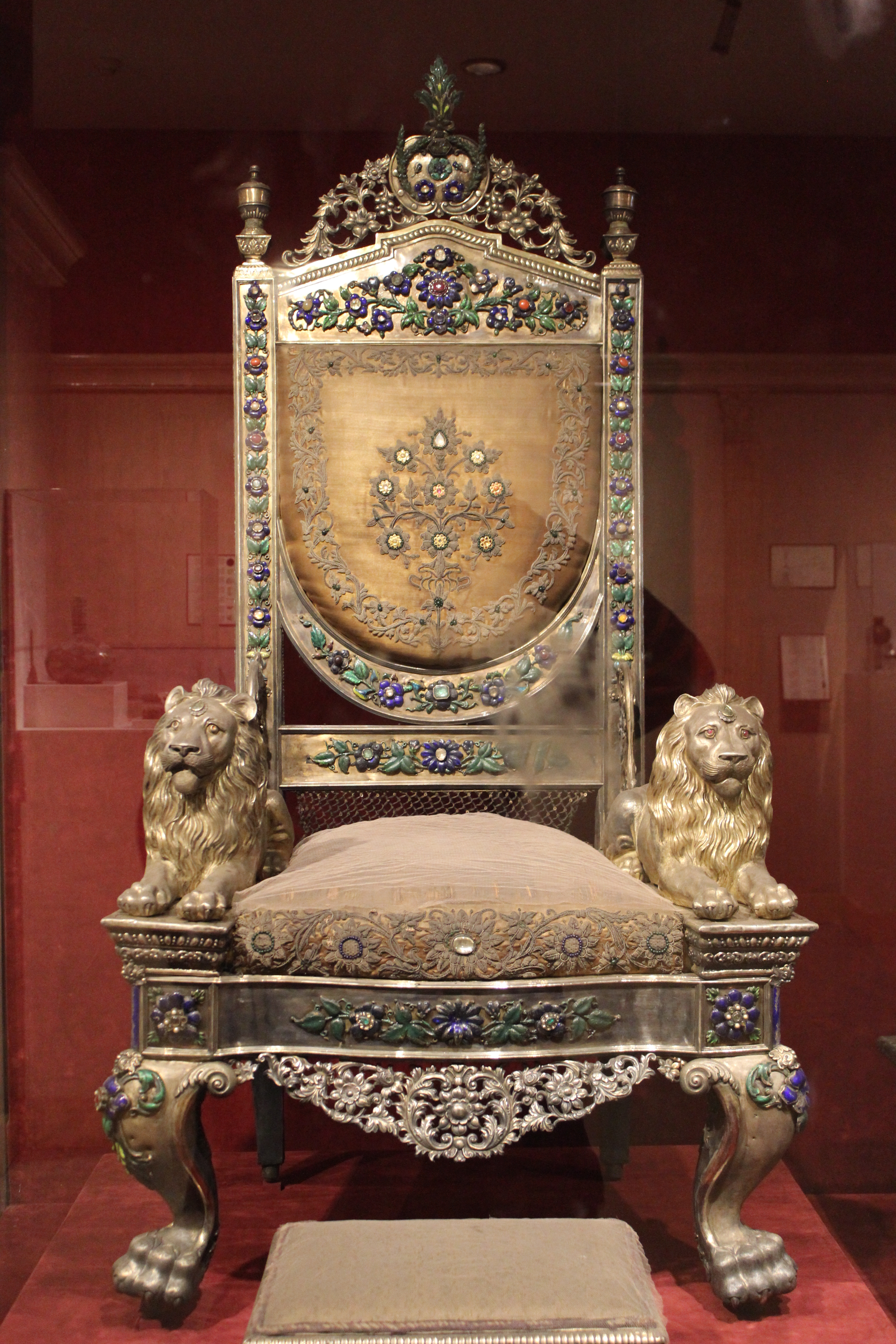
Throne of Raja of Benaras, at National Museum, Delhi.

== History of Ramnagar ==
The residential palace of the Naresh is the Ramnagar Fort at Ramnagar near Varanasi, which is next to the river Ganges. The fort was built on the instructions of Maharaja Balwant Singh with creamy chunar sandstone in the eighteenth century. It is a typically Mughal style of architecture with carved balconies, open courtyards, and picturesque pavilions.

Kashi Naresh donated over 1,300 acres (5.3 km^{2}) of land on the outskirts of the city to build the campus of Banaras Hindu University.

On 28 January 1983, the Kashi Vishwanath Temple was taken over by the government of Uttar Pradesh and its management was transferred to a trust, with the late Vibhuti Narayan Singh, then Kashi Naresh, as president, and an executive committee with the Divisional Commissioner as chairman.

=== Ram Leela at Ramnagar ===
When the Dussehra festivities are inaugurated with a colourful pageant, the Kashi Naresh rides an elephant at the head of the procession. Then, resplendent in silk and brocade, he inaugurates the month-long folk theatre of Ramlila at Ramnagar.

The Ramlila is a cycle of plays which recounts the epic story of Rama, as told in Ramcharitmanas, the version of the Ramayana written by Tulsidas. The plays, sponsored by the Maharaja, are performed in Ramnagar every evening for 31 days. On the last day the festivities reach a crescendo as Rama vanquishes the demon king Ravana. Maharaja Udit Narayan Singh started this tradition of staging the Ramleela at Ramnagar in the mid-nineteenth century.

Over a million pilgrims arrive annually for the vast processions and performances organized by the Kashi Naresh. It has been recognized as an intangible world cultural heritage by UNESCO.

== Geography ==
From 1737, the state included most of present-day Bhadohi, Chandauli, Jaunpur, Mirzapur, Sonbhadra, and Varanasi districts, including the city of Varanasi. Balwant Singh expelled Fazl Ali from present-day Ghazipur and Ballia, and added it to his domains.

Between 1775 and 1795, the British gradually took over administration of most of the state, leaving the rajas to directly administer two separate areas – an eastern portion, corresponding to present-day Bhadohi district, and a southern portion, comprising present-day Chakia tehsil of Chandauli district. These two areas made up the princely state of Benares from 1911 to 1948. The rajas retained certain revenues from rents, and certain administrative rights, in the rest of the territory, which the British administered as Benares Division, part of the United Provinces. The rajas made their main residence in Ramnagar.

== All India Kashi Raj Trust ==
Serious work on the Puranas began when the All India Kashiraj Trust was formed under the patronage and guidance of Dr. Vibhuti Narayan Singh, the Maharaja of Kashi, which, in addition to producing critical editions of the Puranas, also published the journal Puranam.

== Rulers ==
The rulers of the state carried the title "Maharaja Bahadur"

=== Maharaja Bahadurs ===
- 1737–1740 Maharaja Mansa Ram Singh (d.1740)
- 1740 – 19 Aug 1770 Maharaja Balwant Singh (b. 1711 – d. 1770)
- 19 Aug 1770 – 14 Sep 1781 Maharaja Chait Singh (b. 17.. – d. 1810)
- 14 Sep 1781 – 12 Sep 1795 Maharaja Mahip Narayan Singh (b. 1756 – d. 1795)
- 12 Sep 1795 – 4 Apr 1835 Maharaja Udit Narayan Singh (b. 1778 – d. 1835)
- 4 Apr 1835 – 13 Jun 1889 Maharaja Ishwari Prasad Narayan Singh (b. 1822 – d. 1889)
- 1 Apr 1911 – 4 Aug 1931 Sir Maharaja Prabhu Narayan Singh (b. 1855 – d. 1931)
- 4 Aug 1931 – 5 Apr 1939 Maharaja Aditya Narayan Singh (b. 1874 – d. 1939)
- 5 Apr 1939 – 15 Aug 1947 Maharaja Vibhuti Narayan Singh (b. 1927 – d. 2000)

=== Titular Maharajas ===
- 15 Aug 1947 – 25 Dec 2000: Vibhuti Narayan Singh (b. 1927 – d. 2000)
- 25 Dec 2000– present: Anant Narayan Singh

== See also ==
- Political integration of India
- Maratha Empire
- Rajputana
