= Purenw =

Purenw or Pureon is a large village located in Kerakat Tehsil of Jaunpur, Uttar Pradesh, India with a total 765 families residing. The Purenw village has a population of 5054 of which 2462 are males while 2592 are females as per the Population Census 2011. As per constitution of India and Panchyati Raaj Act, Purenw village is administrated by Sarpanch (Head of Village) who is elected representative of village.

== History ==
The Purenw estate was ruled by a branch of the Raghuvanshi Rajputs.The Zamindar Family of Purenw claim that they are from the lineage of Raja Harishchandra. Zamindari of Purenw Estate was abolished by The Uttar Pradesh Zamindari Abolition and Land Reforms Act of 1950

In the mid of 14 century Shri Thakur Khielha Rai Raghuvanshi Ji founded the area of Bayalasi (Bayalasi means the area having 42 Villages), and ruled over it. He was migrated from Ayodhya, came and settled in the area of Bayalasi. After Thakur Khiela Rai his son Shri Thakur Dalpat Rai ruled over the area of Bayalasi. Thakur Dalpat Rai had 4 sons. The area of Bayalasi got divided into 4 parts. Thakur Megh Dev Rai the most powerful son of Thakur Dalpat Rai got 12 Villages. He himself settled in the Purenw village and made it centre to rule.

From Thakur Megh Dev Rai to Thakur Jham Rai there is difference of 10 generation.

Thakur Jham Rai Raghuvanshi is considered as the real founder of reign of Raghuvansh in Bayalasi. He started the Celebration of Dussehra by organising Ramleela in the Purenw village which was start from the first day of Navratri till Vijayadashmi and on the day of Vijayadashami "Shastra poojan" was done and fair was organised in local market of the village. Today also this rituals are followed by the Raghuvanshi family of Purenw .

Thakur Jham Rai Raghuvanshi was succeeded by his son Thakur Shukham Rai Raghuvanshi. He had 7 sons. His son become next zamindar.

Thakur Keval Singh become the next ruler and he was succeeded by his son Thakur Shoak Singh. During his rule British East India Company had made treaty of Allahabad in 1764 according to which Balwant Singh become the King of Princely state of Benares and Jaunpur become the part of Benares however Balwant singh had kept zamindari of Purenw independent.

Thakur Ruder Singh Elder son of Thakur Keval Singh become the next zamindar. He was contemporary of kashi Naresh Mahipat Narayan Singh. During his time period Jaunpur was annexed into British India based on the Permanent settlement of 1779, and thus was subject to the Zamindari system of land revenue collection. Britishers has given right of tax collection to Thakur Ruder Singh in the areas of Bayalasi. Thakur Ruder Singh was succeeded by his Grandson.

Thakur Daulat Singh, become the next ruler of Purenw. He was contemporary of Ishvari Prasad Narayan Singh of Benares state. Ishvari Prasad Narayan Singh wanted to abolish zamindari of Purenw but Thakur Daulat Singh went to court. The hearing was done at Fort Williams of Calcutta. Court gave his judgment in the favor of Thakur Daulat Singh and made Purenw Estate. Thakur Daulat Singh was succeeded by his elder son.

Thakur Shiv Sharan Singh become the next Zamindar of Purenw Estate.He was succeeded by his Grandson.

Thakur Udaya Narayan Singh become the next zamindar of Purenw estate of Jaunpur District. He was also elected as the Sarpanch of Purenw Village for his life time. People of village use to call him "Sarpanch Baba". He was also Elected as President of Bayalasi Inter and degree College for his life time. He had granted land to construct Government School for girls in Purenw. He had also granted land for the construction of Purenw Mahadev Temple. He had made Purenw Ramleela Samiti and Sadhan Cooperative Society for the poor people of village. He was succeeded by his younger son Om prakash Singh.

Presently Thakur Om Prakash Singh son of Shri Thakur Udaya Narayan Singh is the last and 19th ruler of zamindar estate of Purenw. He has 2 Sons Shri Navin Kumar Singh & Shri Vikas Kumar Singh and have 5 Grandchildren Vibhu Singh, Rishi Singh, Prithu Singh, Aditi Singh and Meenakshi Singh.

== Zamindars ==
The Zamindars of the Purenw Estate carried the title "Thakur".

=== Zamindar ===
- Thakur Khielha Rai Raghuvanshi ( In 14 century).
- Thakur Dalpat Rai Raghuvanshi.
- Thakur Megh Dev Rai Raghuvanshi.

' ' ' 10 Generation Difference from Thakur Megh Dev Rai Raghuvanshi to Thakur Jham Rai Raghuvanshi. ' '

- Thakur Jham Rai Raghuvanshi.
- Thakur Keval Singh.
- Thakur Shoak Singh.
- Thakur Ruder Singh(1758–1838).
- Thakur Daulat Singh(1816–1869).
- Thakur Shiv Sharan Singh(1846–1935).
- Thakur Uday Narayan Singh(1908–1984).
- Thakur Om Prakash Singh(11Dec 1947).
