= Battle of Buxar =

1764 battle of the Bengal War

- Part of the Bengal War
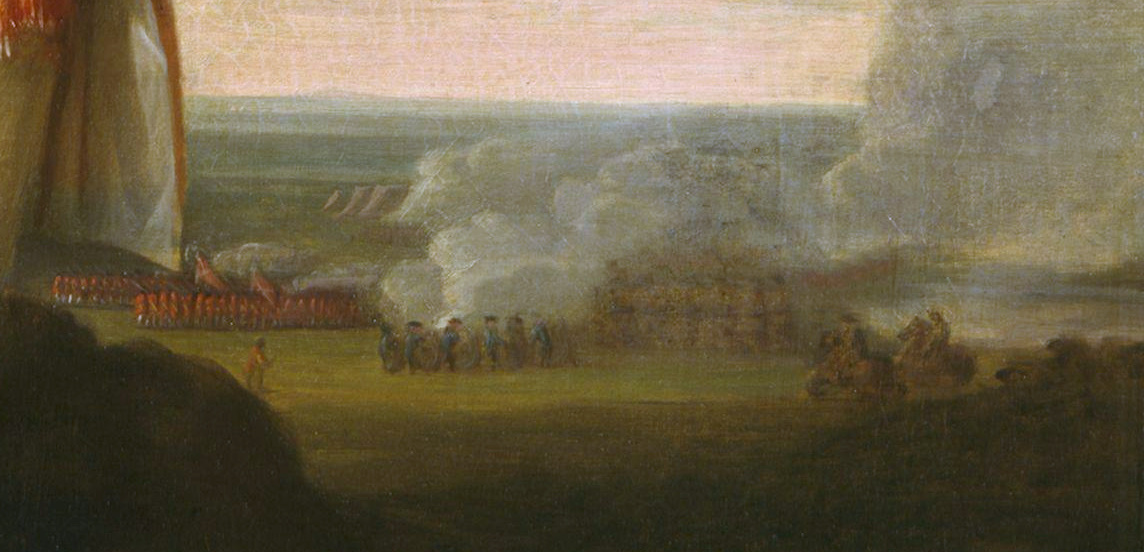
- Detail of a portrait of Hector Munro showing the battle
Date	22–23 October 1764
Location	Buxar, Bihar 25°34′N 83°59′E
Result	British victory: Treaty of Allahabad

Belligerents
Great Britain: East India Company	Mughal Empire; Bengal Subah; Oudh State; Kashi Kingdom

Commanders and leaders
Sir Hector Munro	Shah Alam II (surrendered); Najaf Khan; Mir Qasim; Shuja-ud-Daula; Balwant Singh

Strength
7,072	40,112

Casualties and losses
289 killed 499 wounded 85 missing	2,000 killed 4,000 wounded

The Battle of Buxar was fought on 22-23 October 1764, between the forces of the British East India Company (EIC), under the command of Major Hector Munro, and the combined armies of Mughal Emperor Shah Alam II and his allies: Mir Qasim, Nawab of Bengal; Maharaja Balwant Singh of Benares; and Shuja-ud-Daula, the Nawab of Awadh and Grand Vizier to the Emperor.

The battle was fought at Buxar, a "strong fortified town" in Bihar, located on the banks of the Ganges river about 130 kilometres (81 mi) west of Patna; it was a challenging victory for the EIC. The defeated Indian rulers submitted to the EIC in 1765.

== Battle ==
The EIC force numbered 7,072: about 1,800 British regulars and 5,300 EIC sepoys. The combined Mughal and alliance armies were estimated to be over 40,000.

Mirza Najaf Khan commanded the right flank of the Mughal army and was the first to advance at daybreak; the EIC lines formed within twenty minutes and reversed the Mughal advance. According to the British, Durrani and Rohilla cavalry were also present and fought during the battle in various skirmishes. But by midday, the battle was over. As the Mughal forces retired, Shuja-ud-Daula blew up large tumbrils and three massive magazines of gunpowder.

Munro divided his army into various columns and particularly pursued Shuja-ud-Daula, retreating west over a boat-bridge across the Karmanasa River. Shuja-ud-Daula destroyed the boat-bridge after crossing the river, thus abandoning the Emperor and some of his own troops. Mir Qasim also fled, and was exiled by Shuja-ud-Daula. Mirza Najaf Khan rallied the remaining forces around the Emperopr and retreated. But the Emperor then chose to negotiate with the victorious British.

Political map of the Indian Subcontinent in the year 1765, green indicating territories loyal to emperor Shah Alam.

The historian John William Fortescue stated that the British casualties totalled 847: 39 killed and 64 wounded from the European regiments and 250 killed, 435 wounded and 85 missing from the East India Company's sepoys. He also stated that the three Indian allies suffered 2,000 dead and that many more were wounded. Another source says that there were 69 European and 664 sepoy casualties on the British side and 6,000 casualties on the Mughal side. The victors captured 133 pieces of artillery and over 1 million rupees of cash. Immediately after the battle, Munro decided to assist the Marathas, who were described as a "warlike race", well known for their relentless hostility towards the Mughal Empire and its Moslem allies.

According to brigadier-general H. Biddulph, "the European infantry was composed of the Bengal European Battalion, two weak companies of the Bombay European Battalion, and small detachments of Marines and of H.M. 84th, 89th and 96th Regiments. The only officers killed were Lt. Francis Spilsbury of the 96th Foot and Ensign Richard Thompson of the Bengal European Battalion."

== Aftermath ==
The Battle of Buxar had far-reaching consequences that reshaped the political landscape of colonial India. Its aftermath witnessed significant shifts in power dynamics and set the stage for British dominance in the Bengal region. Following their victory over the Mughal Emperor and his allies, the EIC emerged as the preeminent power in Bengal. The battle was the beginning of the end for the Mughal Empire's political control, as the Company continued to consolidate its influence over vast territories. However, this rise to power came with various challenges, especially from the zamindars of Bihar.

Mir Qasim disappeared into impoverished obscurity.Though he carried away 3M rupees worth of gemstones, he later died in poverty in 1777. The Emperor Shah Alam II surrendered himself to the British, and Shuja-ud-Daula fled west, hotly pursued by the victors. The whole Ganges valley lay at the company's mercy; Shuja-ud-Daula eventually surrendered. The defeated Indian rulers were forced to sign the Treaty of Allahabad, ending the war in 1765. The treaty granted the EIC Diwani rights, which allowed them to collect revenue from the territories of Bengal, Bihar, and Orissa on behalf of the Mughal emperor. Eventually, in 1772, the EIC abolished local rule and took complete control of the province of Bengal-Bihar. The battle exposed the inherent weaknesses and divisions among the Indian rulers. The lack of unity and coordination between the Nawabs and the Mughal Emperor made it easier for the British to defeat them. This further exacerbated the fragmentation of political power in India and paved the way for British rule on the subcontinent.

== Gallery ==
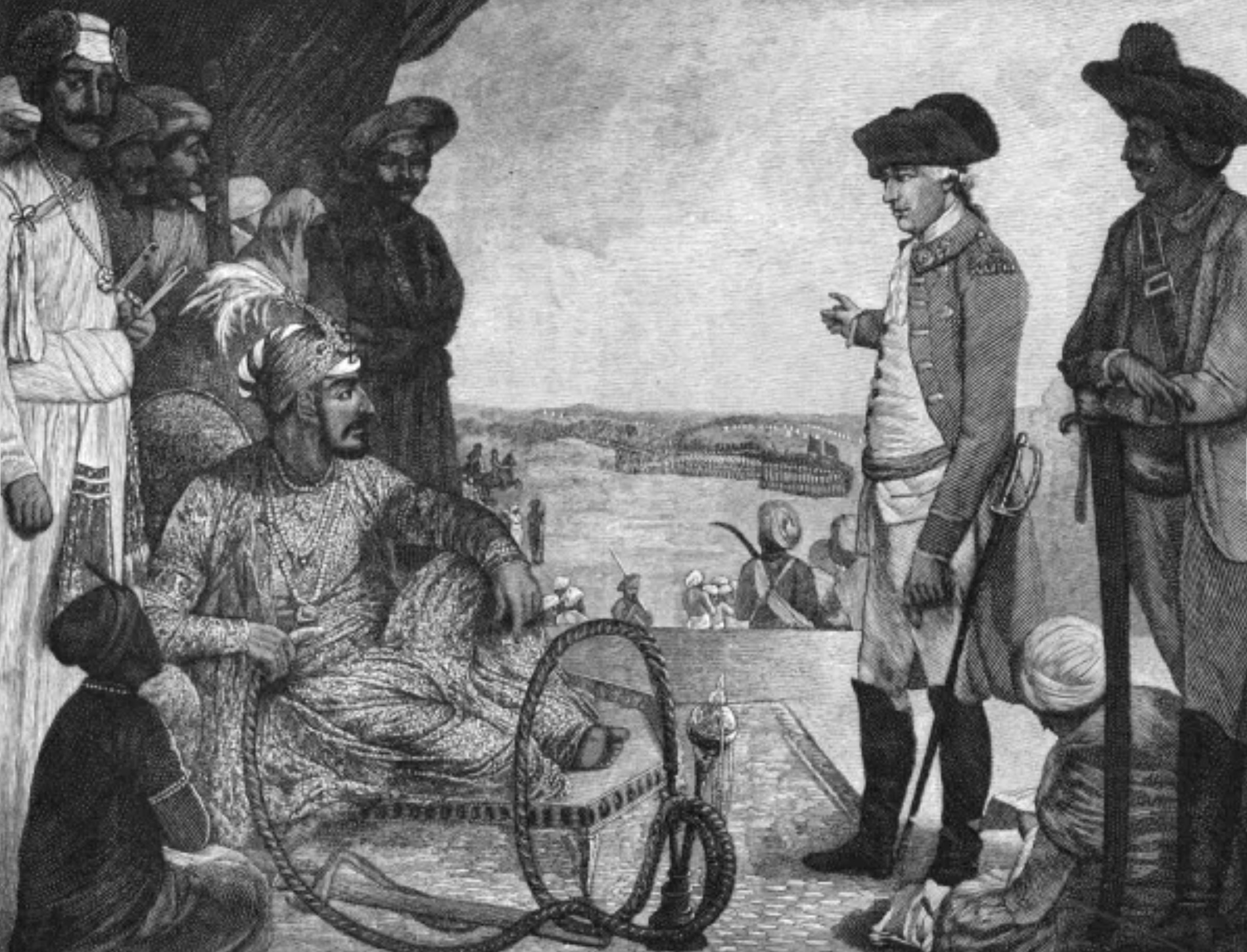
1894 illustration of Shah Alam II reviewing the British East India Company's troops in 1781

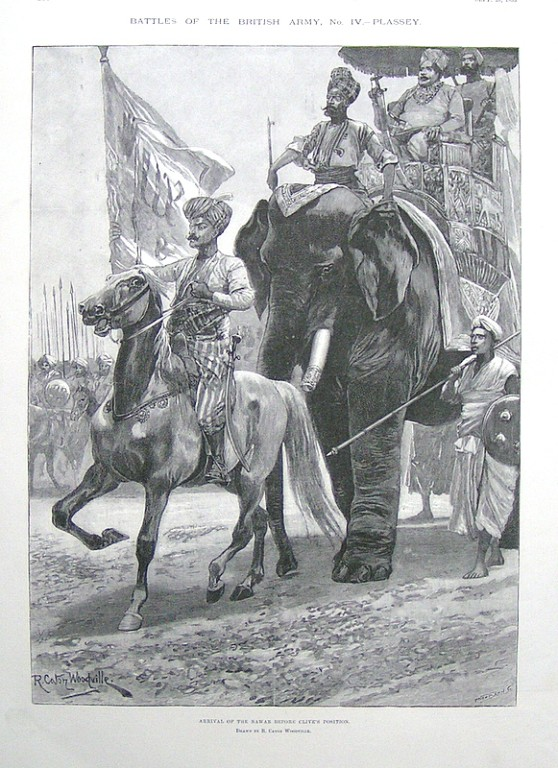
The Nawab of Bengal, Mir Qasim

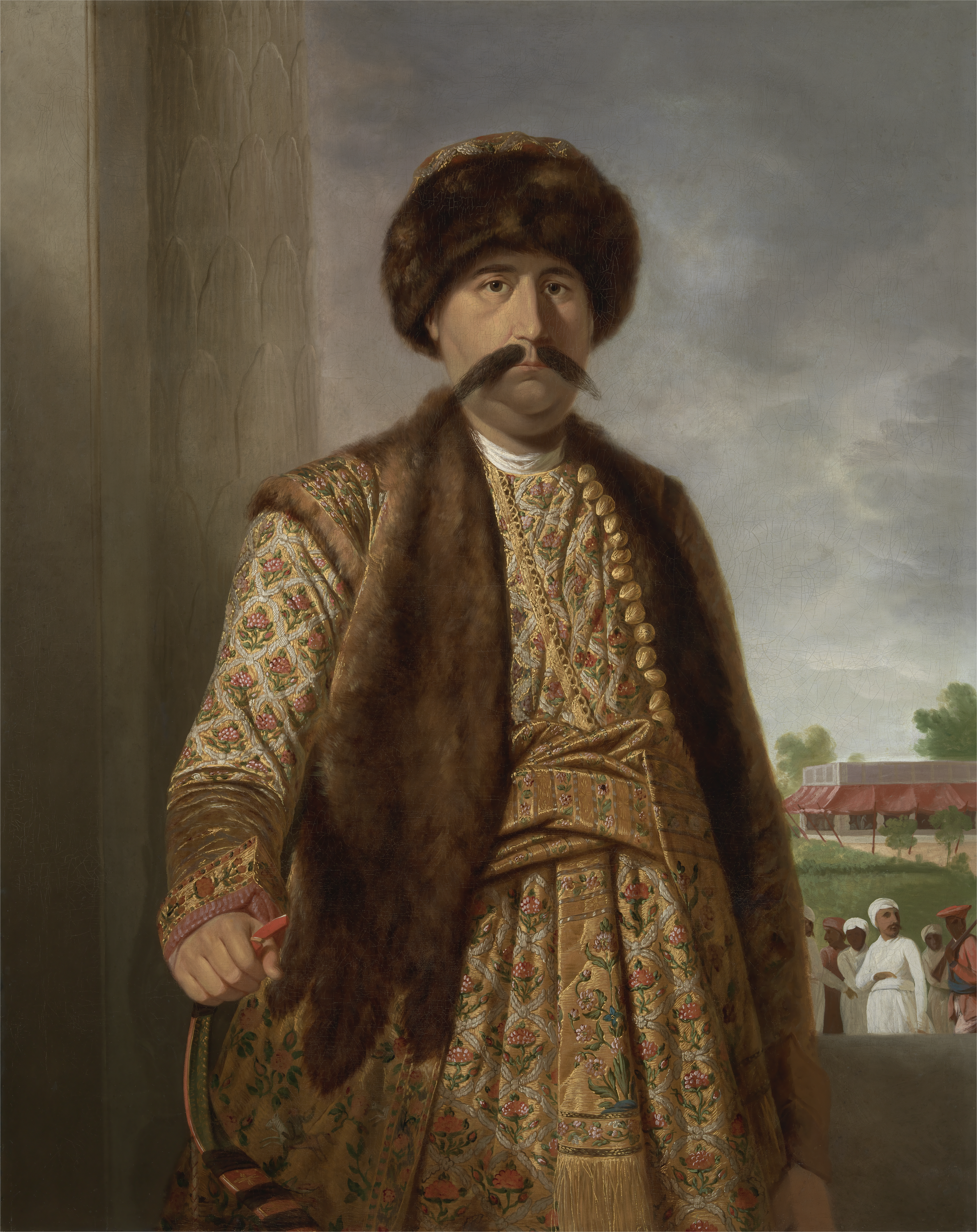
Shuja-ud-Daula served as the Vizier of the Mughal Empire; he was a life-long friend of Shah Alam II.

== See also ==
- Battle of Plassey
