= Vibhuti Narayan Singh =

Indian scholar, Maharaja Bahadur of Benares from 1939–1948

- Kashi Naresh
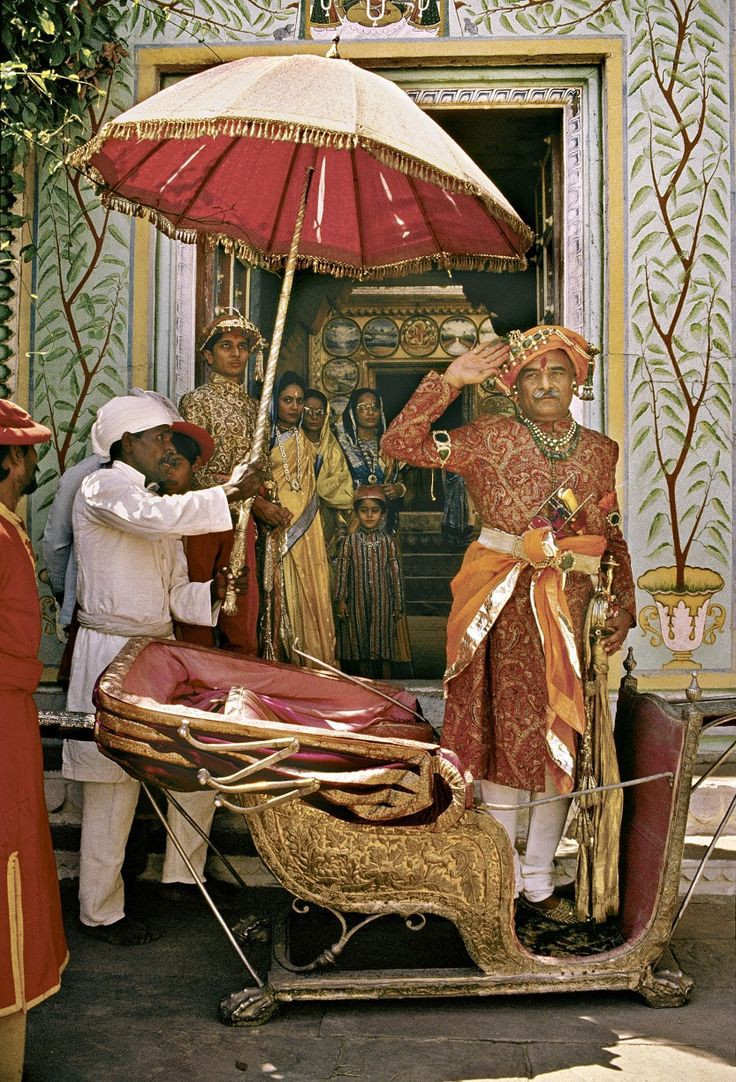

Maharaja Bahadur of Benares
- Reign: 5 April 1939 – 15 October 1949
- Predecessor: Aditya Narayan Singh
- Titular reign: 15 October 1949 – 28 December 1971
- Successor: Position abolished by the 26th Amendment of the Indian Constitution

Head of the Narayan dynasty
- Tenure: 5 April 1939 - 25 December 2000
- Predecessor: Aditya Narayan Singh
- Successor: Anant Narayan Singh
- Born: 5 November 1927; Ramnagar, Benares, Benares State, British India (present-day Uttar Pradesh, India)
- Died: 25 December 2000 (aged 73); Ramnagar, Varanasi, Uttar Pradesh, India
- Issue: 4
- Dynasty: Narayan dynasty
- Father: Aditya Narayan Singh (adoptive)

Vibhuti Narayan Singh (5 November 1927 – 25 December 2000) was the king of Benares, a city considered holy, located in the present-day Indian state of Uttar Pradesh. He was the last Bhumihar ruler of Benares, as after his reign all princely titles were abolished. Vibhuti Narayan Singh was a godly figure in Varanasi and he is still remembered as "Guardian of Kashi".

== Early life ==
Vibhuti Narayan Singh was born on 5 November 1927. He was adopted in June 1934 by his relative, Maharaja Aditya Narayan Singh (1874–1939), the Maharaja Bahadur of Benares. The day after the Maharaja's death on 4 April 1939, Vibhuti Narayan Singh was appointed his successor to the Narayan dynasty.

== Education ==
Singh studied at Mayo College, Ajmer. He received his master's degree in Sanskrit from Banaras Hindu University, Varanasi, where he studied with the famous grammarian, Vagish Shastri. He was a scholar of Sanskrit, Veda and Purana.

== Contribution ==
On 28 January 1983 the Vishwanath Temple was taken over by the government of Uttar Pradesh and its management was transferred to a trust of which Singh was president.

In 1947, under his leadership, the Shree Kashi Naresh Education Trust laid the foundation of the Kashi Naresh Government Post Graduate College (KNPG), in the Gyanpur of Bhadohi district (U.P).

An intermediate college is named after him in Gyanpur and another in Surajpur at Mau district in Uttar Pradesh.

== Death ==
Singh died on 25 December 2000. His body was cremated with state honours at Manikarnika Ghat in Varanasi.

Preceded by Maharaja Aditya Narayan Singh	Rulers of Benares State; 1939–1948	Succeeded by Acceded to India
