= Impeachment of Warren Hastings =

1787–1795 charging of the Governor-General of Bengal

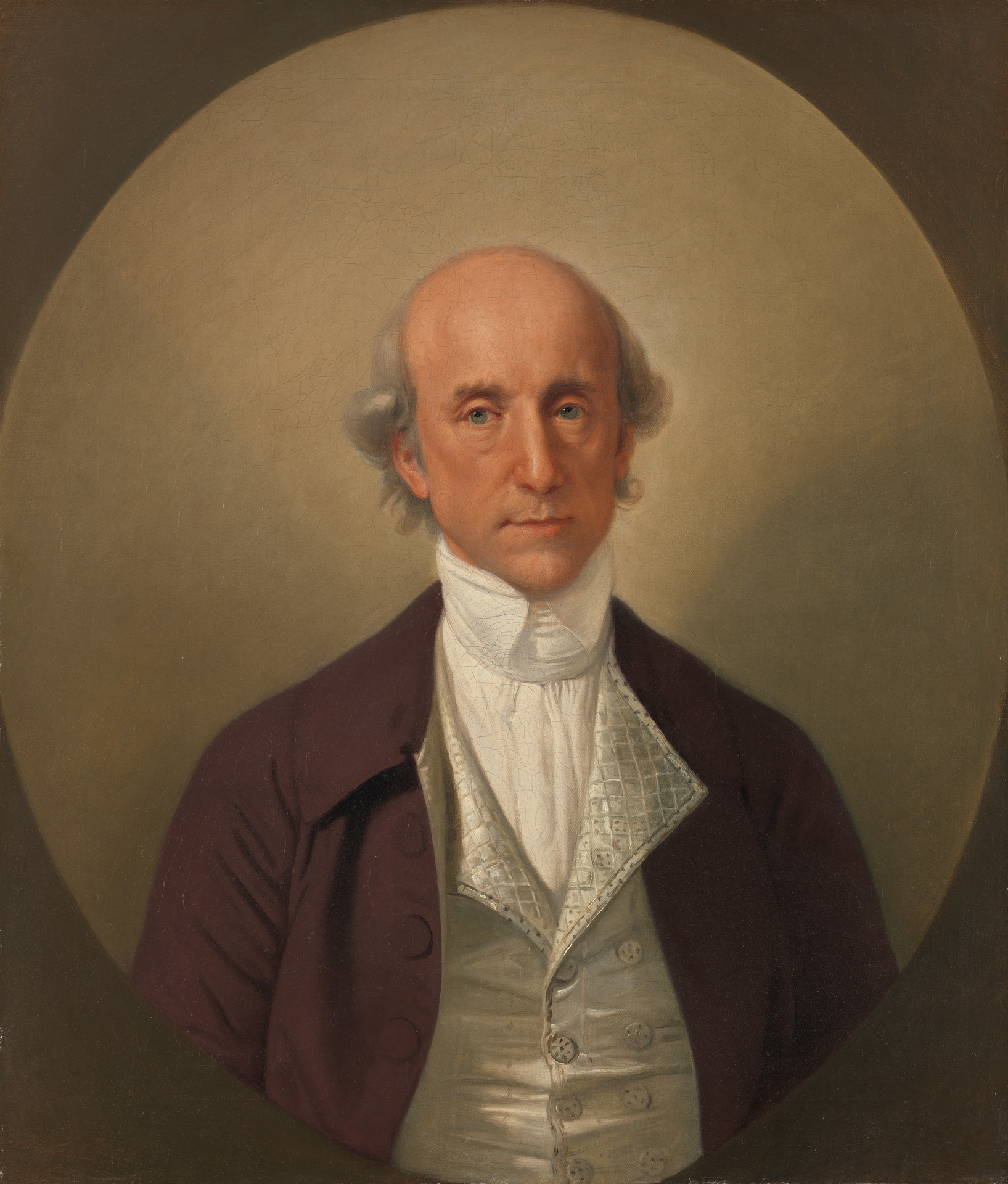
Warren Hastings in 1783–1784

The impeachment of Warren Hastings, the first governor-general of the Bengal Presidency in India, was attempted between 1787 and 1795 in the Parliament of Great Britain. Hastings was accused of misconduct during his time in Calcutta, particularly relating to mismanagement and personal corruption. The impeachment prosecution was led by Edmund Burke and became a wider debate about the role of the East India Company and the expanding empire. According to historian Mithi Mukherjee, the impeachment trial became the site of a debate between two radically opposed visions of empire—one represented by Hastings, based on ideas of absolute power and conquest in pursuit of the exclusive national interests of the colonizer, versus one represented by Burke, of sovereignty based on a recognition of the rights of the colonized.

The trial did not sit continuously and the case dragged on for seven years. When the eventual verdict was given, Hastings was overwhelmingly acquitted. It has been described as "probably the British Isles' most famous, certainly the longest, political trial".

== Background ==
=== Appointment ===
Born in 1732, Warren Hastings spent much of his adult life in India after first travelling out as a clerk of the East India Company in 1750. Hastings developed a reputation as an "Indian" who sought to use traditional Indian methods of governance to run British India rather than the policy of importing European-style law, government and culture favoured by many of his colleagues and representatives of other colonial powers in India. After working his way through the ranks of the Company he was appointed in 1773 as governor general, a new position that had been created by the North government in order to improve the running of British India. The old structure of rule had come under strain as the company's holdings had expanded in recent decades from isolated trading posts to large swathes of territory and population.

The powers of the governor general were balanced out by the establishment of a Calcutta Council which had the authority to veto his decisions. Hastings spent much of his time in office marshalling his own supporters on the Council in an effort to avoid being outvoted.

=== Disputes and war ===
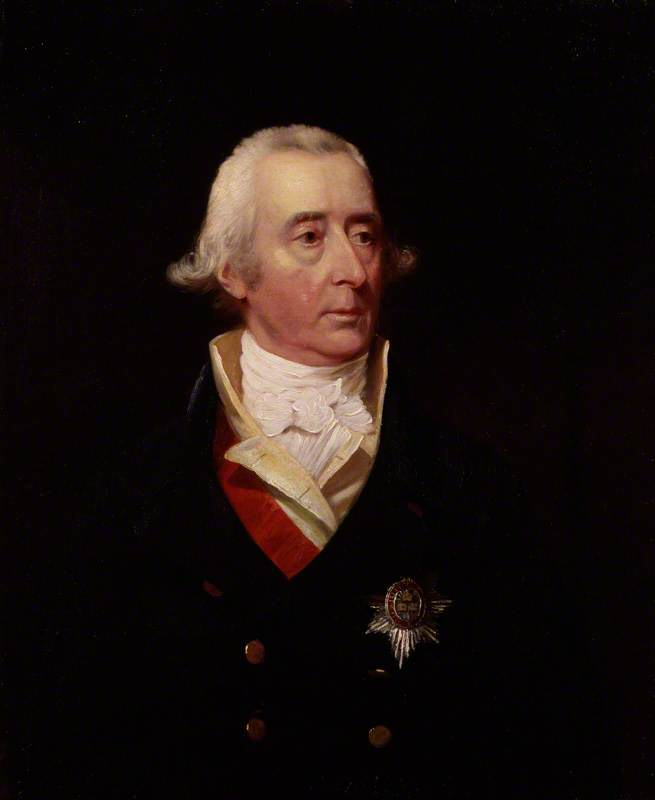
Hastings' initial accuser Sir Philip Francis

Hastings soon ran into opposition on the council. His principal enemy was the Irish-born politician Philip Francis. Francis developed a strong dislike of Hastings and was convinced that the Governor General's policies were self-serving and destructive. This was a belief shared with some other members of the Council whom he was able to influence. Francis and Hastings' personal rivalry continued for many years and led to a duel between them in 1780 in which Francis was wounded, but not killed. Francis returned to Britain in 1781 and began raising questions about Hastings' conduct. He found support from many leading opposition Whigs.

In 1780 Hyder Ali, the ruler of Mysore, went to war with the company after British forces captured the French-controlled port of Mahé. Taking advantage of Britain's involvement in the American War of Independence and the support of French forces Hyder went on the offensive and enjoyed success during the opening stages of the war, inflicting a serious defeat at the Battle of Pollilur and at one point threatening Madras itself with capture. The Commander in Chief Eyre Coote went south with reinforcements and defeated Hyder's army in a series of battles which helped to steady the position in the Carnatic. Hyder was unable to secure victory and the war ended in a stalemate. It was halted by the Treaty of Mangalore in 1784 which largely restored the status quo ante bellum. Even so, the British position in India had been severely threatened.

The war shook public confidence and raised questions about the supposed mismanagement by the company's agents in India. It proved to be a catalyst for the growing campaign in London against Hastings which gathered strength during the ensuing years.

=== First attacks ===
The company had already gone through scandals in the 1760s and 1770s and the wealthy nabobs who returned to Britain from India were widely unpopular. Against this backdrop the criticisms circulated by Francis and others provoked a general consensus that the India Act 1773 (13 Geo. 3. c. 63) had not been sufficient to rein in the alleged excesses. The Indian question again became a contentious political issue.

The Fox–North Coalition fell from power after it attempted to bring in a radical East India Bill in 1783. The following year the new government of William Pitt passed the India Act 1784 which established a Board of Control and which finally stabilised the governance of India.

Hastings was personally attacked by Charles James Fox during the presentation of his India Bill. When Pitt introduced his bill he failed to mention Hastings at all, seen as expressing a lack of confidence, and made wide-ranging criticisms of the company. He suggested that recent wars in India had been ruinous and unnecessary. Hastings was particularly upset by this, as he was an admirer of Pitt. By now, Hastings wished to resign and return home unless the role of Governor General was given greater freedom to exercise power—which was unlikely to be granted to him. He handed over to an Acting Governor General, John MacPherson until a permanent replacement was appointed.

=== Return to Britain ===
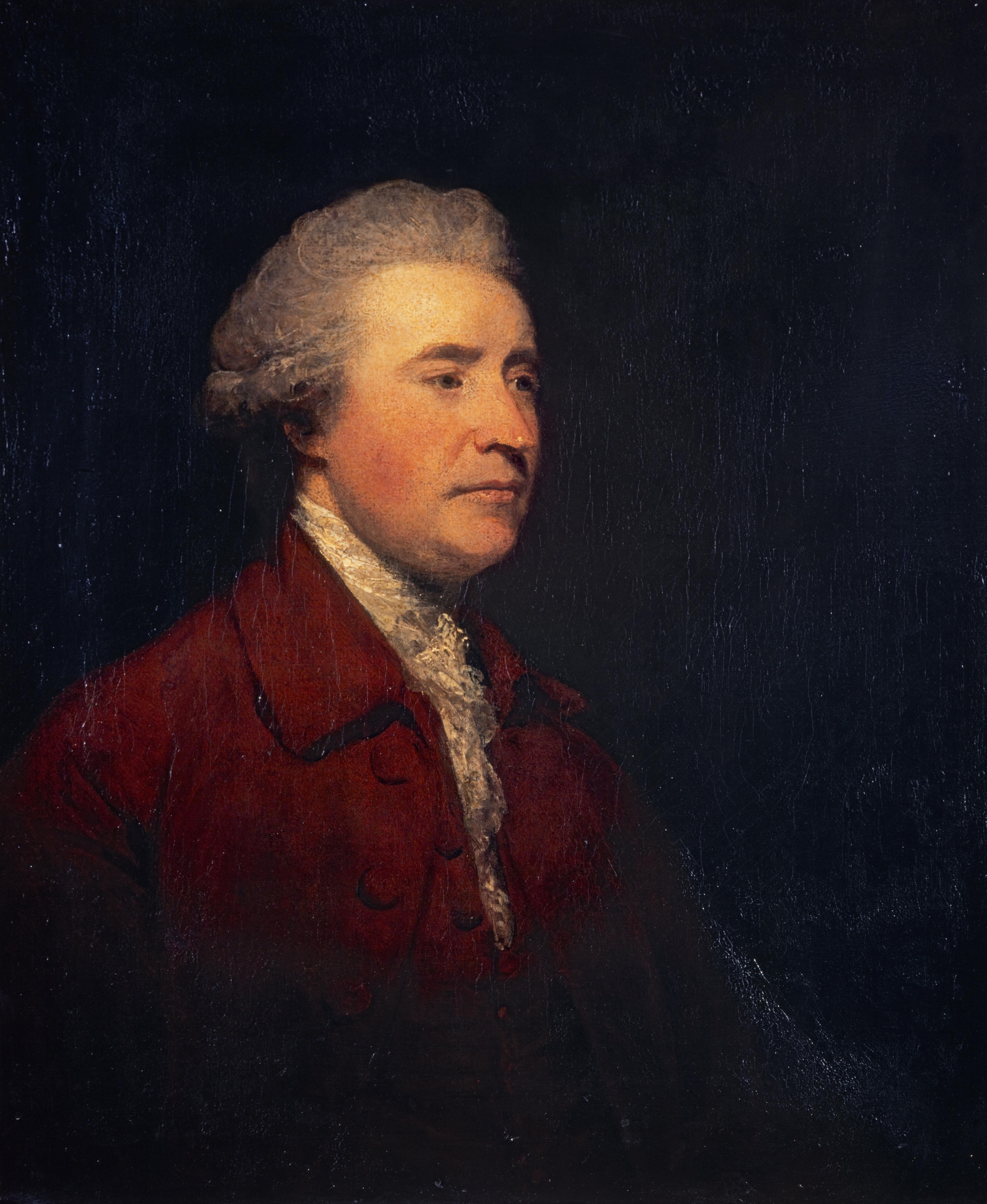
The MP Edmund Burke led the prosecution of Hastings.

Hastings sailed for home on 6 February and reached Britain in June 1785. During the voyage he wrote a defence of his conduct The State of Bengal and presented it to Henry Dundas. Hastings anticipated he would face attacks in Parliament and the press but expected them to be short-lived and to fall away once he was there in person to defend himself. Initially this proved to be the case as he enjoyed an audience with King George III and a unanimous vote of thanks by the directors of the East India Company. Hastings even hoped to be awarded an Irish peerage. However, in Parliament Edmund Burke announced he "would at a future date make a motion respecting the conduct of a gentleman just returned from India".

In early 1786 Burke began his first move by raising questions over Hastings' role in the Maratha War. The attacks on Hastings were largely made by opposition Whigs hoping to embarrass the government of William Pitt. Pitt and other government ministers such as Dundas defended Hastings and suggested that he had saved the British Empire in Asia. Philip Francis made eleven specific charges against Hastings, and others later followed. They covered various subjects such as the Rohilla War, execution of Nanda-Kumar and Hastings' treatment of the Rajas of Benares Chait Singh. Pitt broadly defended Hastings, but declared his punishment of the Rajah had been excessive. In the wake of this an anti-Hastings motion was passed in the Commons 119–79.

Encouraged by Pitt's failure to adequately support Hastings, his opponents pressed on with their campaign. The situation quickly deteriorated for Hastings. It soon became clear that he was heading towards an impeachment. Hastings recruited Edward Law, 1st Baron Ellenborough to act in his defence. On 21 May 1787 Hastings was arrested by the Serjeant-at-Arms and taken to the House of Lords to hear the charges against him.

Hastings was to be prosecuted in the House of Lords by an Impeachment Committee. Impeachment was a relatively rare process of prosecuting those in high public office. Previous figures who had faced such trials included the Duke of Buckingham, a favourite of James I, and the Earl of Strafford, whose impeachment failed (but was followed up by a legislative bill of attainder that resulted in Strafford's execution).

== Impeachment ==
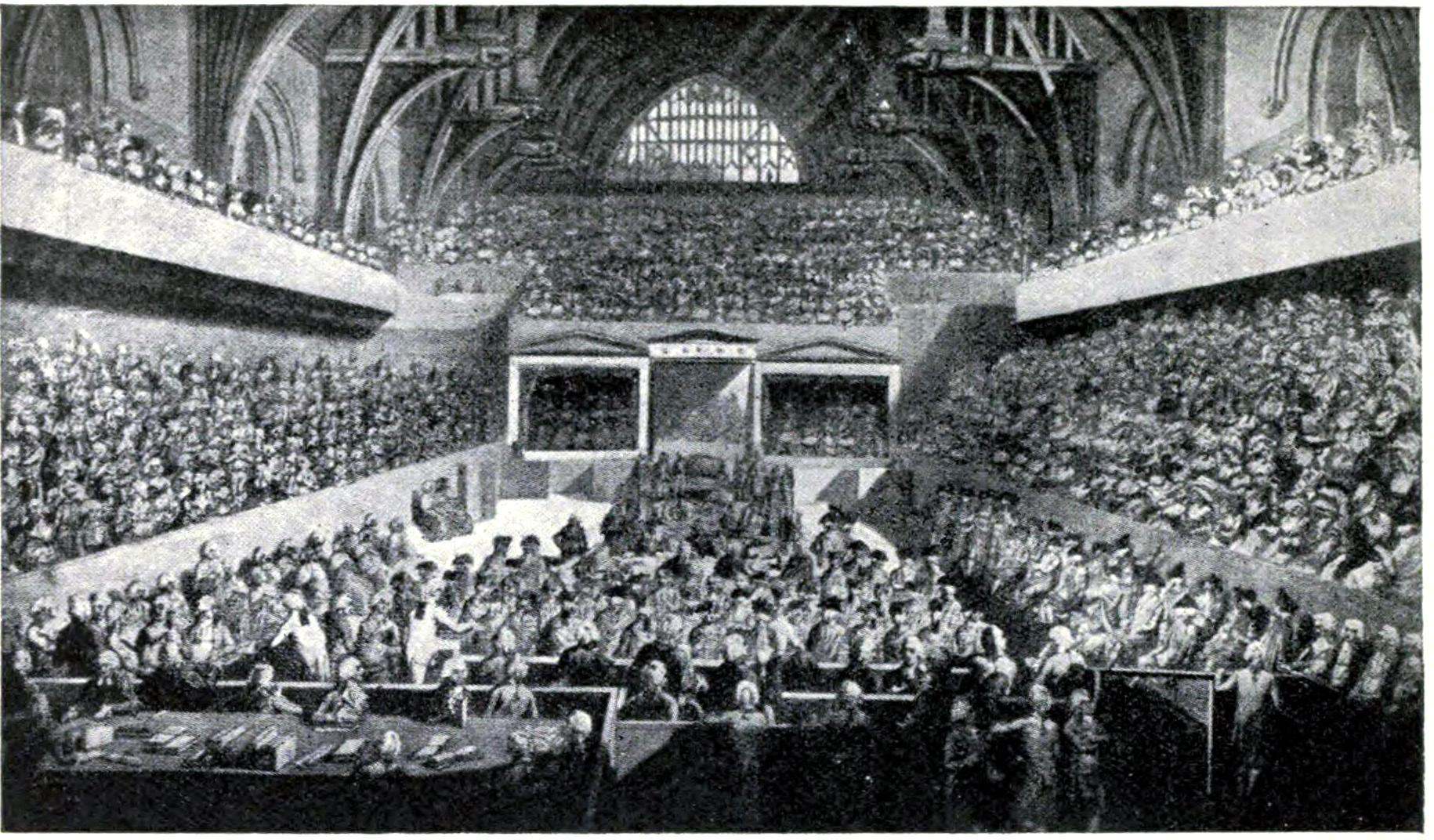
The trial of Warren Hastings, 1788

=== Opening ===
Hastings' trial began on 13 February 1788. It took place in Westminster Hall, with members of the House of Commons seated to Hastings' right, the Lords to his left, and a large audience of spectators, including royalty, in the boxes and public galleries. The proceedings began with a lengthy address by Edmund Burke, who took four days to cover all the charges against Hastings. While Burke took the proceedings very seriously, Macaulay said that many spectators treated the trial as a social event. Hastings himself remarked that "for the first half hour, I looked up to the orator in a reverie of wonder, and during that time I felt myself the most culpable man on earth."

Hastings was granted bail in spite of Burke's suggestion that he might flee the country with the wealth he had allegedly stolen from India. Further speeches were made over the coming weeks by other leading Whigs such as Richard Brinsley Sheridan and Charles James Fox. In total there were nineteen members of the Impeachment Committee.

=== Public opinion changes ===
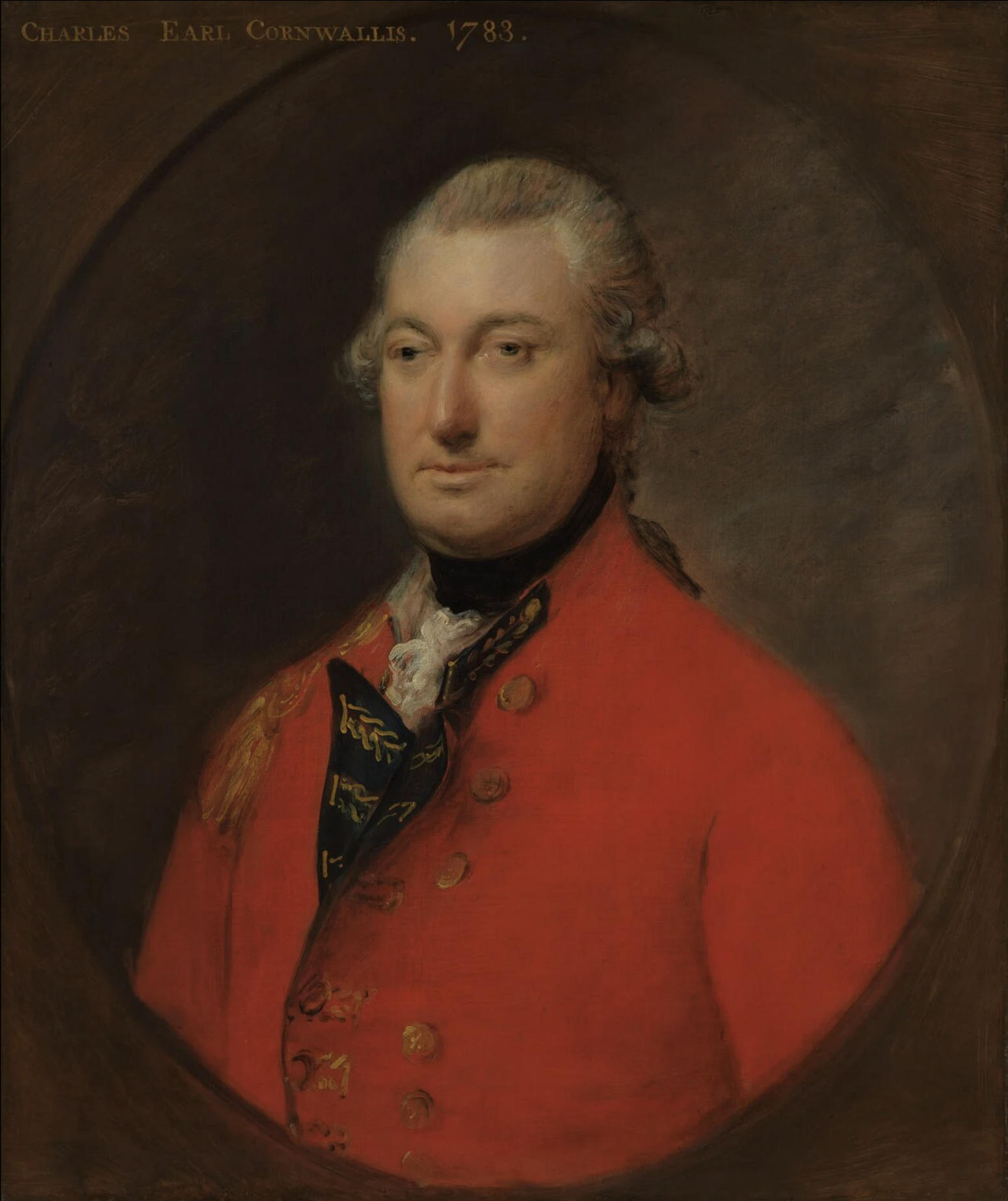
Lord Cornwallis, whose testimony was a major boost to Hastings' defence

In spite of the early excitement about the trial public interest in it began to wane as it dragged on over months and years. Other major events dominated the news particularly once the French Revolution began in 1789. Sheridan now complained he was "heartily tired of the Hastings trial" despite being one of its instigators. As the trial progressed, public attitudes about Hastings also began to shift. Hastings had initially been overwhelmingly portrayed as guilty in the popular press, but doubts were increasingly raised. Increased support for Hastings may have been a result of declining perceptions of his accusers. In a cartoon James Gillray portrayed Hastings as the "Saviour of India" being assaulted by bandits resembling Burke and Fox.

A major lift for the defence came with the testimony on 9 April 1794 of Lord Cornwallis who had recently returned from India, where he succeeded Hastings as Governor General. Cornwallis rejected the accusations that Hastings' actions had damaged Britain's reputation and observed that Hastings was universally popular with the inhabitants. When asked if he had "found any just cause to impeach the character of Mr Hastings?" he replied "never".

A further blow for the prosecution came with the evidence of William Larkins the former Accountant General of Bengal. They had rested their hopes on his revealing widespread corruption but he denied that Hastings had amassed any illicit money and made a defence of his conduct. Various other figures came forwards as character witnesses to support Hastings. Burke's reply to the defence lasted nine days from late May to mid-June 1794.

=== Verdict ===
On 23 April 1795 the Lord Chancellor Lord Loughborough oversaw the delivery of the verdict. A third of the Lords who had attended the trial's opening had since died and only twenty-nine of the others had sat through enough of the evidence to be permitted to pronounce judgment. Loughborough asked each of the peers sixteen questions relating to individual charges. On most charges he was unanimously found not guilty. On three questions five or six peers gave guilty verdicts, but Hastings was still comfortably cleared by majority vote. This overwhelming verdict had been expected for some time and caused little surprise.

Burke, who had invested a large amount of time and energy into the prosecution, was frustrated by the ultimate failure of the impeachment. He had warned the Lords that it would be "to the perpetual infamy" of the House if they voted to acquit and remained convinced of Hastings' guilt until his death in 1797.

== Aftermath ==
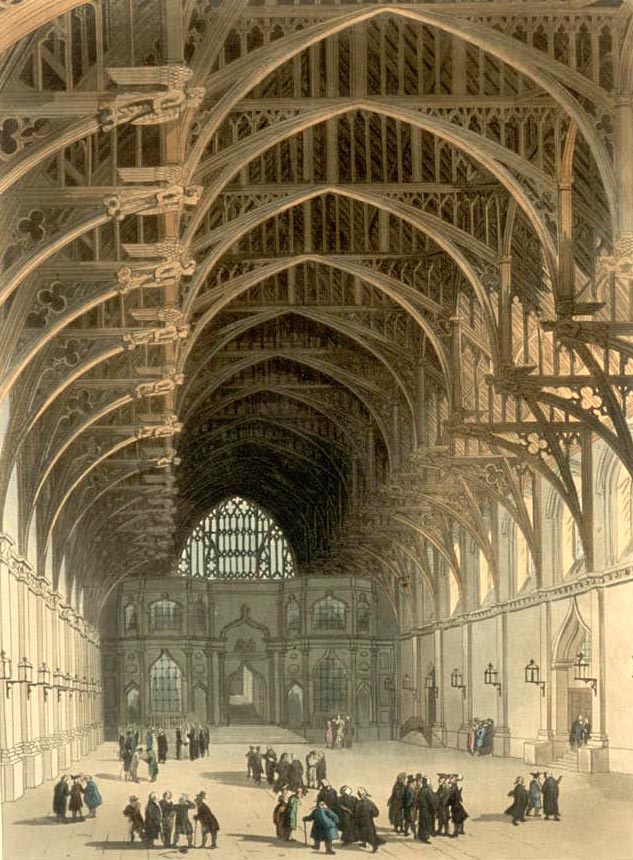
Westminster Hall where the trial took place

Hastings was financially ruined by the impeachment and was left with debts of £70,000. Unlike many other Indian officials he had not amassed a large fortune while in India and he had to fund his legal defence, which had cost an estimated £71,000, out of his own funds. His defence lawyer was Richard Shaw(e) who built his mansion Casino House in Herne Hill at least in part from the proceeds, employing John Nash and Humphry Repton as landscape designer (responsible for the water garden the remnants of which survived as Sunray Gardens in 2012).

Meanwhile, Hastings appealed to the British government for financial assistance and was eventually compensated by the East India Company with a loan of £50,000 and a pension of £4,000 a year.

Although this did not solve all his financial worries, Hastings was ultimately able to fulfill his lifelong ambition of purchasing the family's traditional estate of Daylesford in Gloucestershire which had been lost in a previous generation. Hastings held no further public office, but was regarded as an expert on Indian matters and was asked to give evidence to parliament on the subject during the Napoleonic Wars in 1812. After he had finished giving his testimony, the members all stood up in an almost unprecedented act for anyone other than the royal family.

Hastings' successors as Governor General, beginning with Lord Cornwallis, were granted the much wider powers that Hastings had sought while in Calcutta. Pitt's India Act served to move much of the supervisory role for India away from the East India Company directors and officials in Leadenhall Street to a new political Board of Control based in London.

The overwhelming failure to secure a conviction, and the stream of testimony that came out of India praising him, have led commentators to ask why Hastings, who appeared to many observers to have given dedicated service to the company and to have curbed its worst excesses, ended up being prosecuted in the first place. A number of factors may have played a part, including partisan politics, although Pitt joined the opposition in supporting the Impeachment.

There has been particular focus on the role played by Pitt—particularly his sudden withdrawal of outright support for Hastings in 1786 which galvanised the opposition into pursuing the case. It is possible that Pitt believed "he ran the very genuine risk of being accused by the opposition of shielding a notorious criminal from justice, for political reasons". Henry Dundas was himself later impeached in 1806 and acquitted in what is currently the last impeachment trial in Britain.

== Bibliography ==
- Garrard, John; Newell, James L. (2006). Scandals in Past and Contemporary Politics. Manchester University Press. ISBN 978-0-7190-6551-4.
- Robert Harvey (1998). Clive: The Life and Death of a British Emperor. St. Martin's Press. ISBN 978-0-312-26569-4.
- Sir Alfred Comyn Lyall (1889). Warren Hastings. Macmillan and Company.
- Mukherjee, Mithi. "Justice, War, and the Imperium: India and Britain in Edmund Burke's Prosecutorial Speeches in the Impeachment Trial of Warren Hastings." Law and History Review 23.3 (2005): 589-630 online. Also see Mukherjee, India in the Shadows of Empire: A Legal and Political History (New Delhi: Oxford University Press, 2010).
- Brian Smith. "Edmund Burke, the Warren Hastings trial, and the moral dimension of corruption." Polity 40.1 (2008): 70-94 online.
- Patrick Turnbull (September 1975). Warren Hastings. New English Library. ISBN 978-0-450-02588-4.
- Peter Whiteley (1996). Lord North: The Prime Minister Who Lost America. Continuum. ISBN 978-1-85285-145-3.
- Wickwire, Franklin B.; Wickwire, Mary (April 1980). Cornwallis, the imperial years. University of North Carolina Press. ISBN 978-0-8078-1387-4.
