= Maharaja Mahip Narayan Singh =

Maharaja Bahadur of Benares from 1781–1795

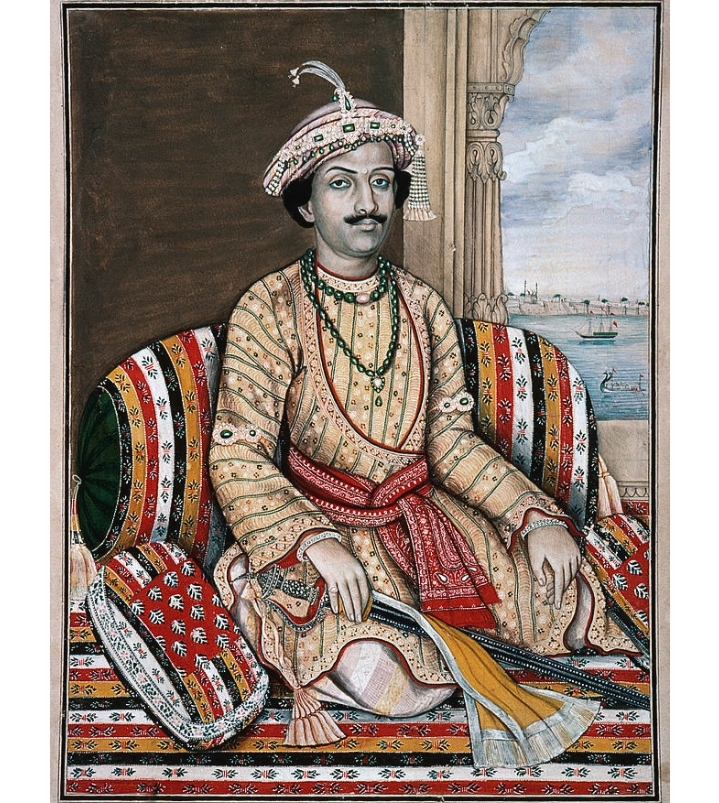
Maharaja Mahip Narayan Singh

Maharaja Mahip Narayan Singh Saheb Bahadur succeeded the throne of Benares on 14 September 1781 . He became the ruler but under the terms of the company, which were that he should serve to dispense justice within his domains and make an annual contribution of 40 lakhs. He continued his family tradition of tussles with Britishers, who in turn labeled him incapable of governing because he refused to levy any taxes on farmers and thus refused to assist Britishers in draining wealth from India towards England, therefore on 27 October 1794, under a formal agreement the four sarkars, or revenue districts, held by the Maharaja were transferred to the direct rule of the Company administration, leaving only the family domains under the rule of the Maharaja; in return Mahip Narayan Singh received 1 lakh per year in compensation and any surplus revenue of the sarkars. Mahip Narayan Singh died barely a year later and was succeeded by his eldest son, Maharaja Sri Udit Narayan Singh Sahib Bahadur.

Preceded by Raja Chait Singh	Ruler of Benares State; 1781–1795	Succeeded by Raja Udit Narayan Singh
