= Maharaja Aditya Narayan Singh =

Maharaja Bahadur of Benares from 1931–1939

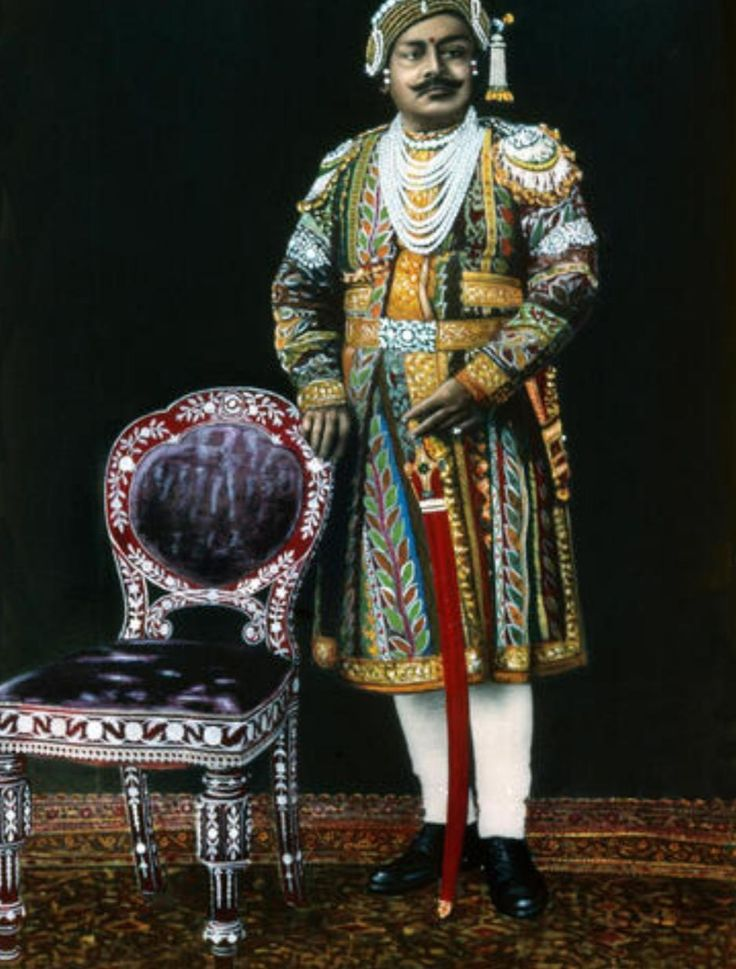
Maharaja Aditya Narayan Singh

Captain H.H Maharaja Aditya Narayan Singh Bahadur (17 November 1874 – 4 April 1939) was the Maharaja of Benares (1931–1939). He would reign for only seven and a half years before dying in 1939, aged 65, but in this short period of time established Colleges for higher education at Gayanpur, Badhohi. He was a great visionary and provided free education to all at all stages including higher education. He established many Sanskrit schools. He established free hospitals at Ramnagar and Badohi. He established a college in the name of his father where free education of great quality was provided to all. The quality of education can be assessed by the fact that his own adopted son studied in the same college with other children. Having no children of his own, Maharaja Aditya Narayan Singh adopted a distant cousin to succeed him. He was a great patron of education and gave his private land for the maintenance of expenditure of BHU in Sunderpur which was given by the state for his personal expenses.

Preceded by Prabhu Narayan Singh	Ruler of Benares State; 1931–1939	Succeeded by Vibhuti Narayan Singh
