= Ishwari Prasad Narayan Singh =

Maharaja Bahadur of Benares from 1835–1889

Sir Ishwari Prasad Narayan Singh
- Maharaja of Benares
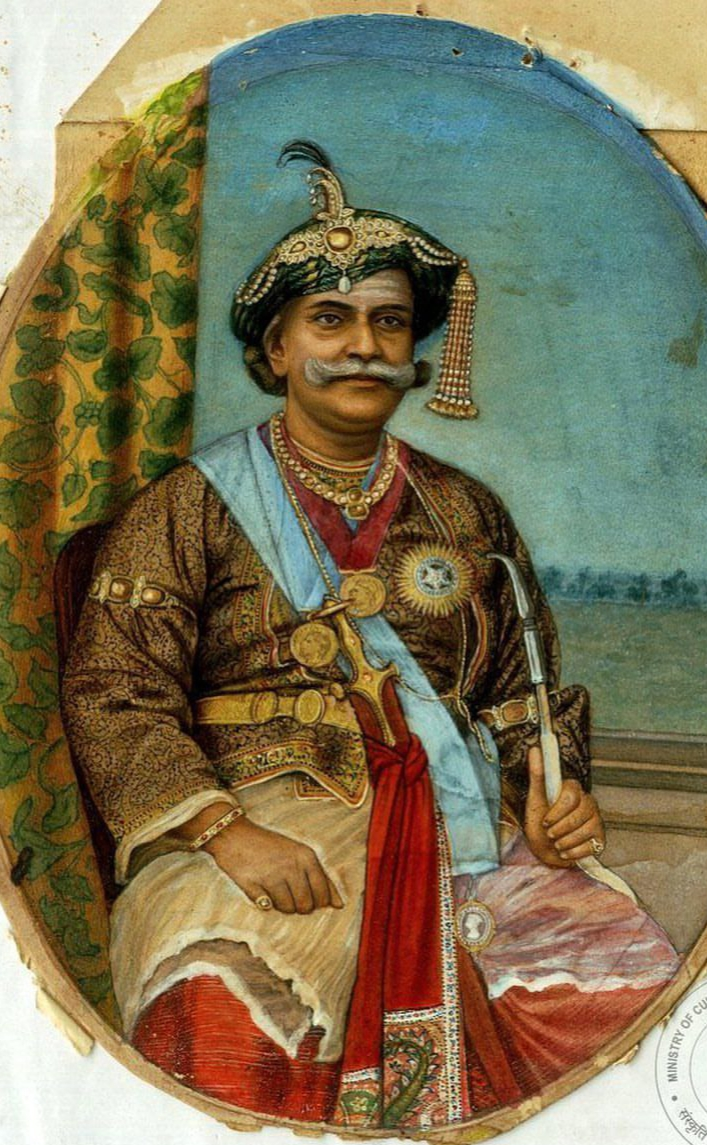
- H.H. Maharaja Ishwari Prasad Narayan Singh

Maharaja of Benares
- Reign: 4 April 1835 – 13 June 1889
- Predecessor: Udit Narayan Singh
- Successor: Prabhu Narayan Singh
- Born: 1822; Benares, British India
- Died: 13 June 1889 (aged 66–67); Ramnagar Fort, Benares, British India
- Issue: Prabhu Narayan Singh (adopted)
- House: Narayan dynasty
- Father: Raj Kumar Sri Prasidh Narayan Singh

His Highness Maharaja Bahadur Sri Sir Ishwari Prasad Narayan Singh, GCSI (1821 – 13 June 1889) was the Maharaja of Benares. He ascended the throne at the age of 13. During the Indian Rebellion of 1857, he remained neutral for the sake of his people, as he has not forgotten the bitter taste of treachery of his countrymen in the battle against Hastings. As a reward, he was promoted to the rank of Maharaja Bahadur in 1859. In 1867, he was granted a personal 13-gun salute; a decade later he was knighted with the GCSI, becoming Sir Ishwari. He eventually became a member of the Viceroy's Legislative Council, and in the crowning achievement of his reign, he restored all the family lands that had been lost for over a century.

Ishwari Prasad was a major patron of the Ramcharitmanas and of its tradition of oral exposition. According to Philip Lutgendorf, he was himself the author of a commentary on the epic and made the Ramnagar court the pre-eminent seat of Manas patronage and scholarship, sponsoring assemblies of Ramayanis (traditional scholars and reciters of the epic) that were graced by the "nine jewels" of the court, the most renowned Manas scholars of the day; his reign has been described as the "Golden Age of the Manas". The three-volume commentary he commissioned was published under his successor, Prabhu Narayan Singh. Under his patronage the Ramnagar Ramlila took its fixed form, and tradition holds that he entrusted the poet Bharatendu Harishchandra with modernising its dialogues.

Ishwari Prasad was both a patron and pupil of the sannyasi poet Kashthajihva Swami (Dev Tirth Swami), who exerted considerable influence at the Ramnagar court. At Ishwari Prasad's request, the swami composed a short commentary titled Ramayan paricarya (Service of the Ramayan), which the maharaja personally expanded with an appendix (Parisist). He also provided direct financial support to independent scholars and frequently invited expounders to Ramnagar to perform katha. His court hosted evening Ramayan-satsangs, which served as an influential forum where prominent next-generation vyasas (oral expounders) gathered and studied.

He was given the title of His Highness in 1889. HH Maharaja Sir Ishwari Prasad Narayan Singh died several months later at the age of 67, and was succeeded by his adopted son, Prabhu Narayan Singh.

| Preceded by Udit Narayan Singh | Ruler of Benares State; 1835–1889 | Succeeded by Prabhu Narayan Singh |
