= Maharaja Chait Singh =

Maharaja Bahadur of Benares from 1770 to 1781

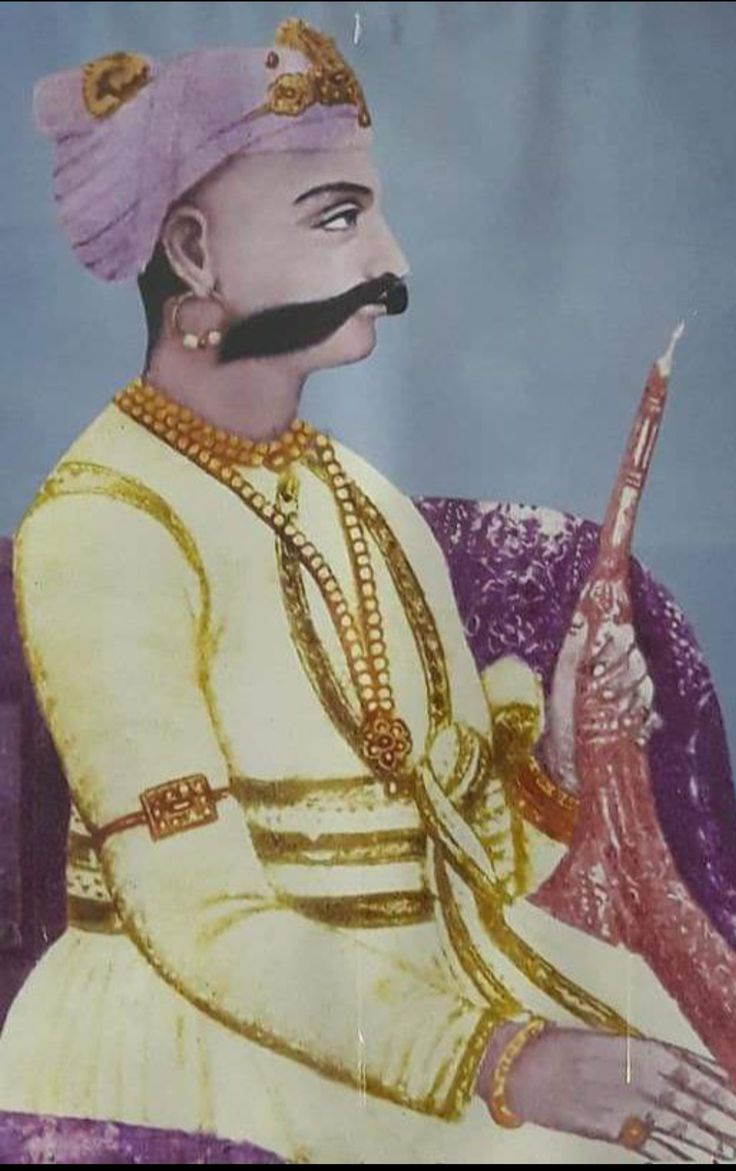
Maharaja Chait Singh

Rafa'at wa Awal-i-Martabat Kashi Naresh Maharaja Chet Singh Sahib Bahadur (died 29 March 1810), commonly known as Raja Chet Singh, a king from the Narayan dynasty, was the 3rd ruler of Kingdom of Benaras in northern India. Maharaja Chet Singh belonged to the Gautam Gotri Bhumihar Brahmin of Narayan Dynasty. Chet Singh succeeded his father, Maharaja Balwant Singh, to the throne as the Raja of Benares in 1770. Although the Nawab of Awadh still wished to hold total suzerainty over the control of Beneras, the British authorities encouraged him to recognise Chet Singh as the ruler of Benaras in 1773. Two years later, the Nawab, by now fed up with British interference, transferred the domain to the East India Company (EIC) under control of the Governor-General of Bengal, Warren Hastings. Under the new British terms, Chet Singh was forced to contribute cavalry and maintenance grants for the company's sepoy battalions. The Raja refused and began to secretly correspond with enemies of the EIC in hopes of forcibly breaking the increasing control of the Company in India. The EIC discovered his plan with the help of some traitors and tried to place him under house arrest in August 1781, pending an audience with Hastings.

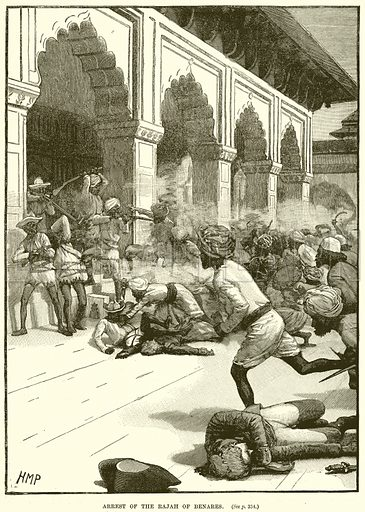
Battle of Shivala Ghat

== Revolt of Benares ==
Hastings came to meet the Raja. The Raja and his men were waiting for such an opportunity. They attcaked and defeated the Company's troops, killed British officers and arrested Hastings. They were advised by Munshi Sadanand (ancestor of Sampurnanand) against killing Hastings. Hastings escaped and left Benaras disguised as a women. This incident gave rise to ,"Godhe Pe Hawda, Haathi pe Jeen, Aise Bhaga Warren Hastings". The Raja gathered a small force. He appealed for assistance against Britishers, from local rulers, who, except Raja Fateh Bahadur Shahi, did nothing. Maharaja Chet Singh's last hope was the Raja of Gwalior who signed a treaty in which maharaja gave him land, protection and troops for making ghats and in return he promised to provide troops when needed but he did not help him so he along with his younger brother Kunwar Sujan Singh and family migrated to Gwalior after the battle. Presently 6 th and 7th generation of Kashi Naresh Maharaja Chet Singh and Kunwar Sujan Singh are residing in Gwalior. The present generation has four brothers named Late Raja Suryanath Singh, Raja Prahlad Singh, Babu Prem Singh and Babu Dilip Singh. The family members are employed in Defence, Bank and private sectors. In various battles with the company's forces, Chet Singh's troops were defeated, the rebellion crushed with the help of traitors, The state was confiscated and given to Avsaan Singh in reward for his loyalty to the Bristish, but revolt restarted. Then Company was forced to instate the nephew of Maharaja Chet Singh(son of his sister Maharajkumari Padma Kuwar), Rafa'at wa Awal-i-Martabat Raja Sri Mahip Narayan Singh Sahib Bahadur on 14 September 1781 and free his father Babu Durgvijay Singh from their custody who was arrested for assisting Maharaja Chait Singh and fighting against the Company. Kashi Naresh Maharaja Chet Singh was granted a jagir of 150 villages for a while until it was later confiscated.

== Aftermath ==
Chait Singh's nephew, Maharaja Sri Mahip Narayan Singh Sahib Bahadur, succeeded his maternal uncle on 14 September 1781 under the terms of the British East India Company, which were that he should serve to dispense justice within his domains and make an annual contribution of 40 lakhs. The incident greatly tarnished Hastings' image and capability, leading to a failed attempt to impeach him by the British parliament.

== Later life ==
He died in Gwalior on 29 March 1810, leaving three sons. His Chattri is still at Gwalior. Carved stone from Chait Singh's palace was later taken and incorporated into the palace of the Maharajas of Cossimbazar.

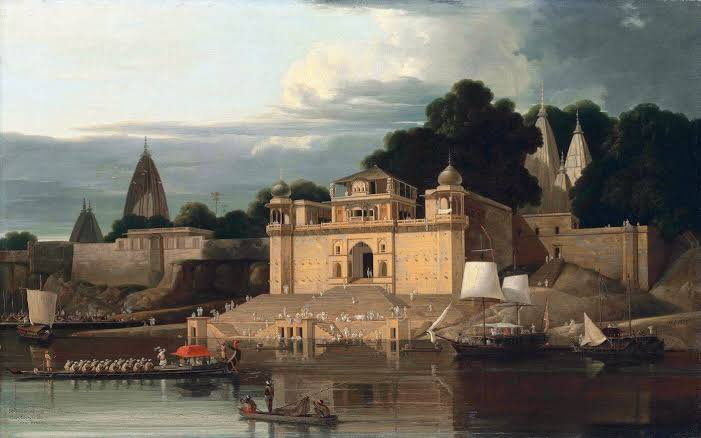
Raja Chet Singh Ghat in Varanasi

Preceded by Raja Balwant Singh	Ruler of Benares State; 1770–1781	Succeeded by Raja Mahip Narayan Singh
