= Treaty of Allahabad =

1765 treaty between the Mughal Empire and the East India Company

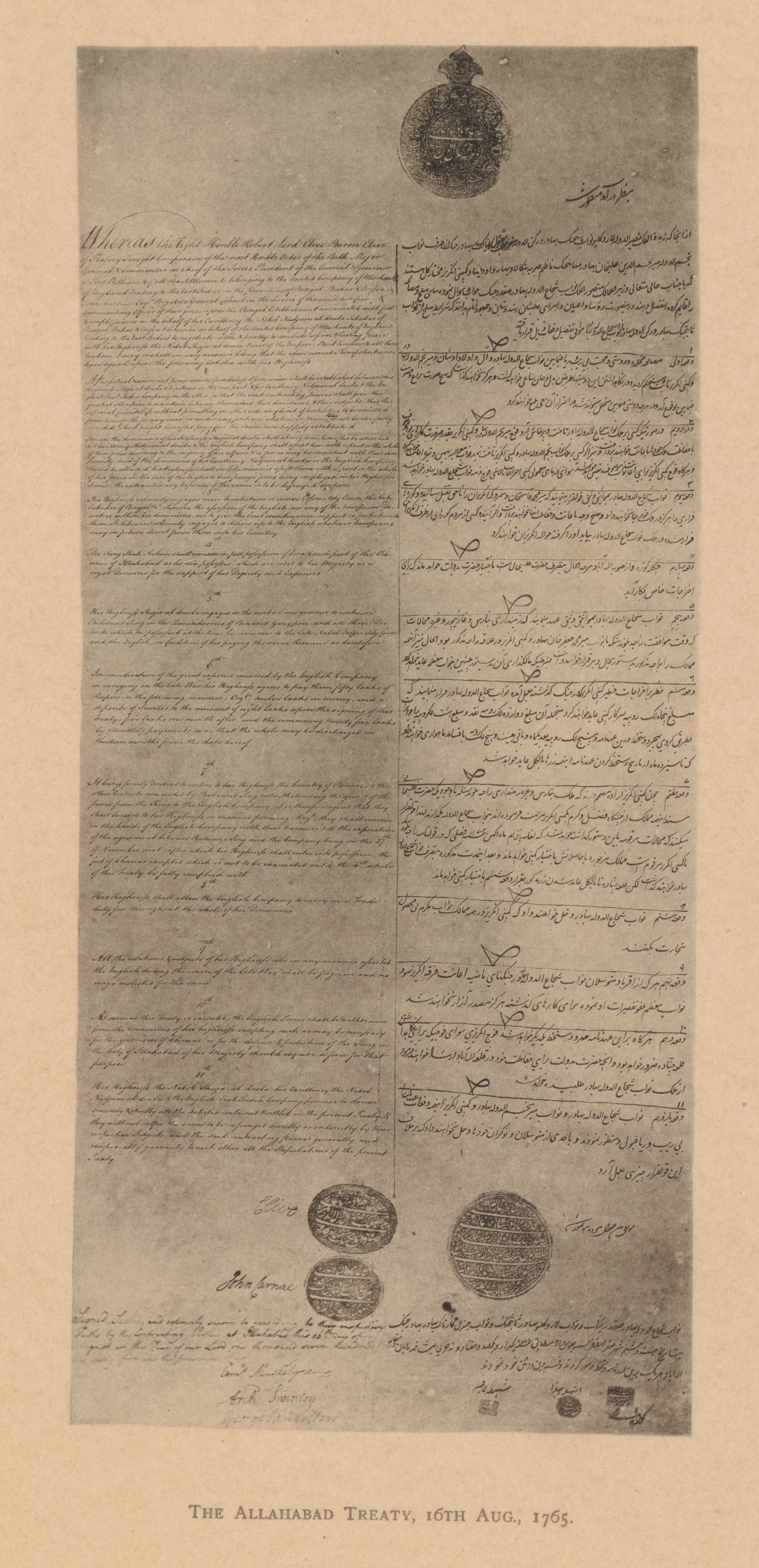
- The Treaty of Allahabad, August 16, 1765
- Context: Battle of Buxar
- Signed: 16 August 1765
- Location: Allahabad
- Signatories: Shah Alam II; Robert Clive; John Carnac
- Parties: Mughal Empire; East India Company
- Languages: English, Persian

Full text
- Treaty of Allahabad at Wikisource

The Treaty of Allahabad was signed on 16 August 1765, between the Mughal Emperor Shah Alam II, son of the late Emperor Alamgir II, and Robert Clive, of the East India Company, in the aftermath of the Battle of Buxar of 22 October 1764. The treaty was handwritten by I'tisam-ud-Din, a Bengali Muslim scribe and diplomat to the Mughal Empire.

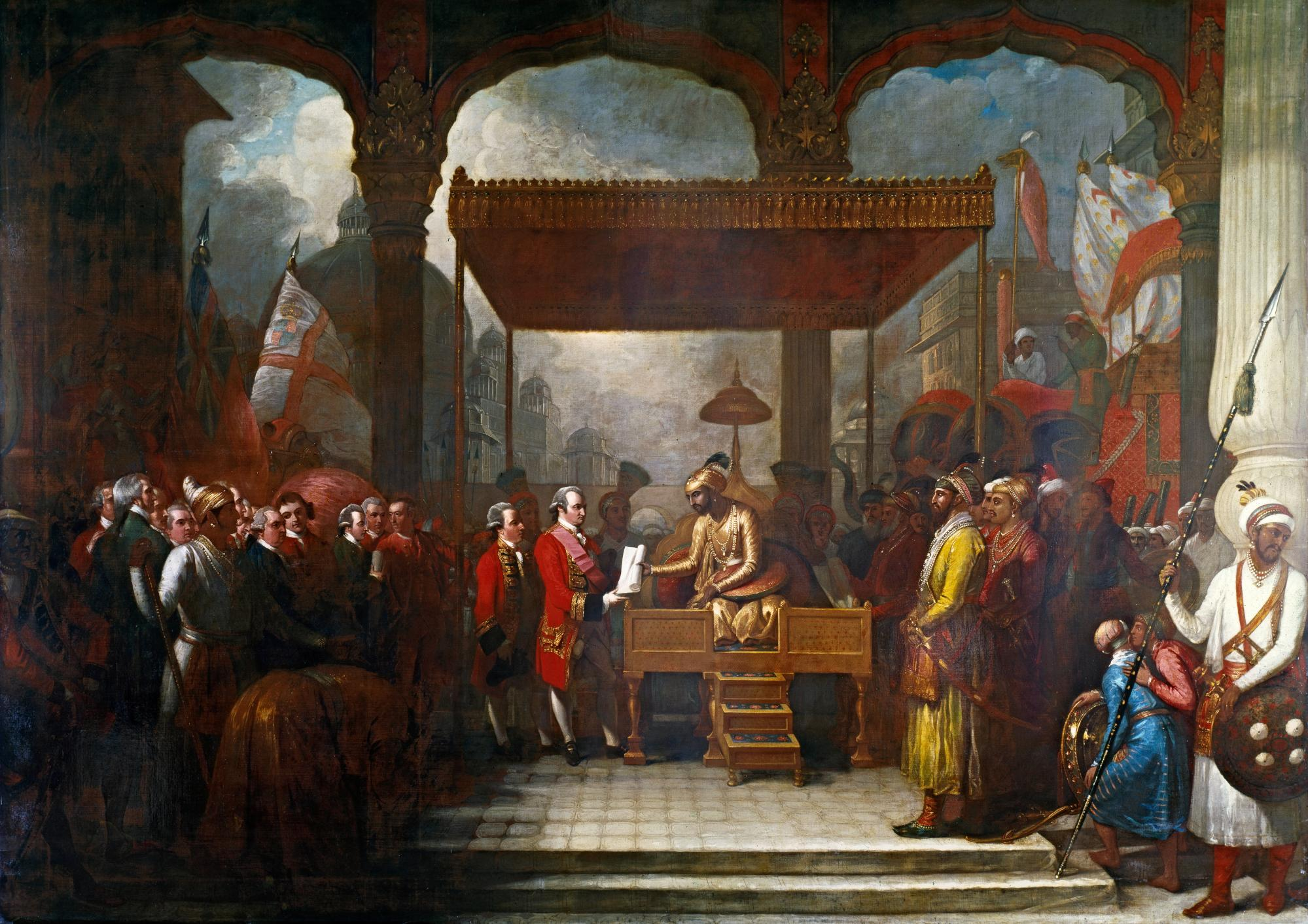
The Mughal emperor Shah Alam hands over the treaty of Allahabad to Robert Clive which transferred tax collecting rights in Bengal Subah to the East India Company, August 1765.

The treaty marked the political and constitutional involvement of the British in India. Based on the terms of the agreement, Alam granted the East India Company Diwani rights, or the right to collect taxes on behalf of the Emperor from the eastern province of Bengal, Bihar and Orissa. These rights allowed the company to collect revenue directly from the people of Bengal, Bihar, and Orissa. In return, the Company paid an annual tribute of twenty-six lakh rupees while securing for Shah Alam II the districts of Kora and Allahabad. The East India Company appointed William Mustoe as Collector to run the administration of this. The tribute money paid to the emperor was for the maintenance of the Emperor's court in Allahabad. The accord also dictated that Shah Alam be restored to the province of Varanasi as long as he continued to pay a certain amount of revenue to the company. Awadh was returned to Shuja-ud-Daula, but Allahabad and Kora were taken from him. The Nawab of Awadh Shuja ud Daulah also had to pay fifty lakhs of rupees as war indemnity to the East India Company.

Moreover, the two signed an alliance by which the company promised to support the Nawab against outside attacks provided he paid for services of the troops sent to his aid. This alliance made the Nawab dependent on the company. This was a turning point in Indian history.

== See also ==
- List of treaties
