= Maharaja Balwant Singh of Benares =

Maharaja Bahadur of Benares from 1738 to 1770

Balwant Singh
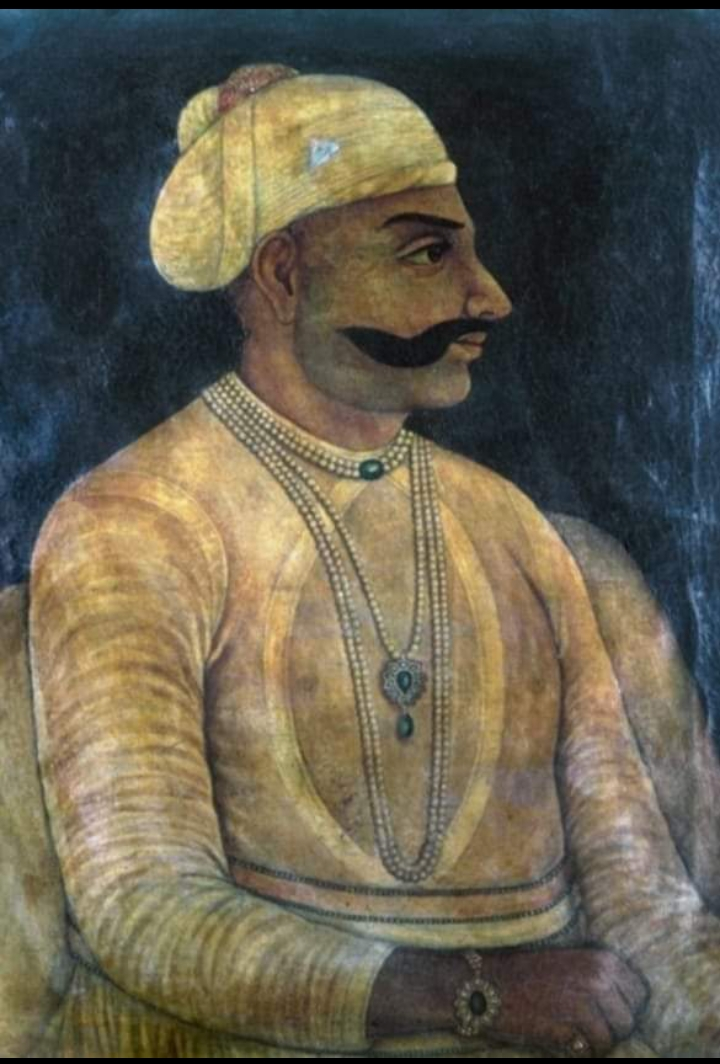

Maharaja Bahadur of Benares
- Reign: 1738–1770
- Predecessor: Mansaram Singh
- Successor: Maharaja Chait Singh
- Born: 1711
- Died: 1770 (aged 58–59)
- Issue: Chait Singh
- Dynasty: Narayan
- Father: Mansaram Singh
- Religion: Bhumihar (hinduism)

Balwant Singh Sahib Bahadur (1711–1770), also known as Maharaja Balwant Singh, was the ruler of Benares State in northern India.

Balwant Singh came from the Narayan dynasty. He succeeded his father Raja Mansaram Singh as Raja of Kaswar and Maharaja of Benares in 1738. Mansaram Singh was the son of Raja Manoranjan Singh, a ruler of Banaras region and resident of Gangapur village. Leading a much more martial life, he built a fort and established a capital at Gangapur, but later moved to Ramnagar. He expelled Nawab Fazl Ali Khan from present-day Ghazipur and Ballia districts, and added the area to his domains. In 1751, he expelled the representative of the Nawab of Awadh in an attempt to carve out a principality at Benares. He had defeated the forces of Nawab during a fierce direct fight with the help of large numbers of artillery guns, cavalry and traditional army of Bhumihar community when the Nawab invaded his domain in March 1752. He continued his guerrilla fight and ultimately the Nawab accepted his terms and he acquired more area than he was earlier holding. Resultantly, a settlement was reached between the two and he had protected his independence from Nawab. Emperor Alamgir II granted him a jagir in Bihar two years later. The first to start a tradition of fighting with the East India Company which continued till the formation of India, he joined Shah Alam and Shuja ud-Daula in their 1763 invasion of Bengal.

Following the Battle of Buxar in 1764, Emperor Shah Alam back stabbed him and transferred Balwant Singh's controlled area to the company, but the Company refused it along with the Treaty of Benares signed by the Emperor the same year. Britishers tried to the power of Beneras region once again to the Nawab of Awadh in 1765, but the maharaja Balwant Singh had protected his power and control over Benares State remained with the Maharaja. This took place five years before Maharaja Balwant Singh's death in 1770. He is also called as the Shivaji of North India.

Balwant Singh was succeeded by his son Rafa'at wa Awal-i-Martabat Chait Singh Sahib Bahadur.

Preceded by Mansa Ram	Rulers of Benares State; 1738 – 1770	Succeeded by Raja Chait Singh
