= Maharaja Udit Narayan Singh =

Maharaja Bahadur of Benares from 1795–1835

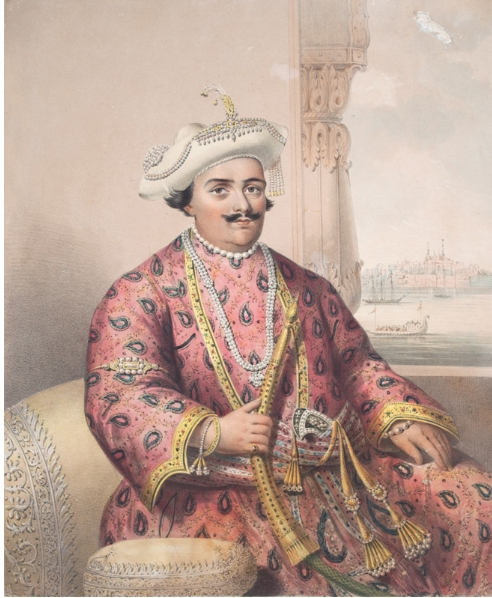
Maharaja Udit Narayan Singh

Maharaja Udit Narayan Singh was the eldest surviving son of Maharaj Mahip Narayan Singh, Udit Narayan Singh Sahib Bahadur (1770 – 4 April 1835, r. 12 September 1795 – 4 April 1835) became the new king of Benares.

== Early life ==
Maharaja Udit Narayan Singh was the eldest son of Maharaja Mahip Narayan Singh of Benares. Maharaja Kumar Deep Narayan Singh and Maharaja Kumar Prasiddh Narayan Singh were younger brothers.

== Ascending the throne ==
Being eldest, Maharaj Udit Narayan Singh succeeded to the throne but he was always accompanied by his brothers in his durbar and used to take all decisions with the counsel of his brothers. The trio sitting together in the durbar are depicted in various contemporary paintings including the huge canvas of Holi durbar, as exhibited in the art gallery of Ramnagar Fort museum.

== Rule and confrontation with the British ==
He was a nationalist and a benevolent ruler who opposed the company rule. He was even more averse to British dominion than his father and had regular confrontations with the company, who, in spite, falsely labeled him as an incapable administrator. He added grandeur to and formed the present shape of the world-famous Ramlila of Ramnagar which was a low-key affair at that time. He like his father, did not levy taxes on farmers and he established checkpoints that took taxes according to the number of goods that were taken to the city for selling and trading to encourage trade in finished goods, so as to check the drain of wealth from India. He was loved and revered by his people who established his statue at the Girija Bagh temple in PAC campus Ramnagar (which is also a part of Ramlila at Ramnagar). Britishers were not able to tolerate him, so conspired against him and under false charges confiscated all the lands of Benaras State and started ruthlessly exploiting the peasants. Unable to spectate it silently, the Maharaja, in 1828, petitioned the company to annul the 1794 agreement under which the Benaras State had lost the sarkars, and to press for their return to state control. However, the company, in accordance with its colonial intent, ordered a sham inquiry into Maharaj Udit Narayan Singh's personal affairs and his governance. As expected, the report backed the false charges of mismanagement. The company, taking advantage of its own fraud, confiscated the last remaining lands of the Maharaja and placed them under their control which was sold into permanent settlements as Zamindaries.

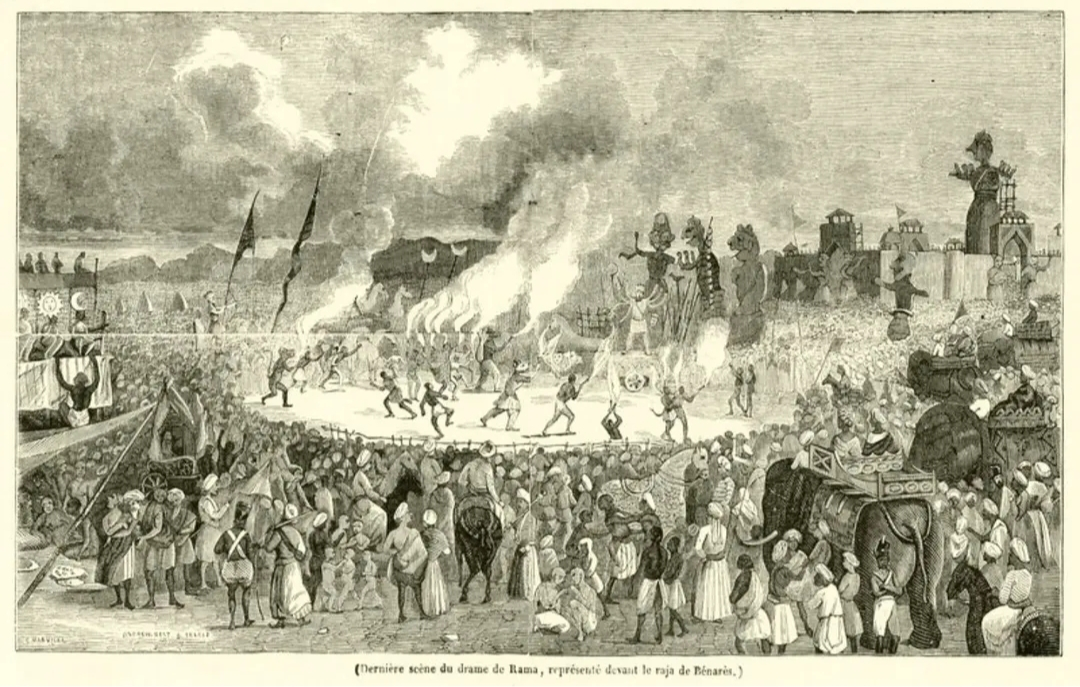
Ramleela in Ramnagar

== Ramlila of Ramnagar ==
As portrayed by the saint-poet Tulsidas in his epic Ramcharitmanas, considered to be one of the holiest books in northern India. The epic narrates the legend of Ramchandra as an ideal human being. The Maharaja wanted this message of journey towards becoming an ideal human being to be spread in his subjects far and wide therefore he give expansion to the continuing Ram Leela tradition which was held as a low-key affair limited only to singing of the verses of Ramcharitmanas and aarti. He converted it to a semi-dramatic form with illustrative action and explanatory dialogues.

== Later life ==
He purchased the Zamindaris (all 96 Parganas) back from the British. He built the first dam of UP for the advancement of agriculture without imposing any additional cess/ tax on the beneficiary farmers for the same . Maharaja Udit Narayan Singh Saheb Bahadur died on 4 April 1835, aged 65, and was succeeded by his adopted son, Maharaja Ishwari Prasad Narayan Singh Sahib Bahadur.

Preceded by Maharaja Mahip Narayan Singh	Rulers of Benares State; 1795–1835	Succeeded by Maharaja Ishwari Prasad Narayan Singh
