= Narayan dynasty =

Bhumihar dynasty

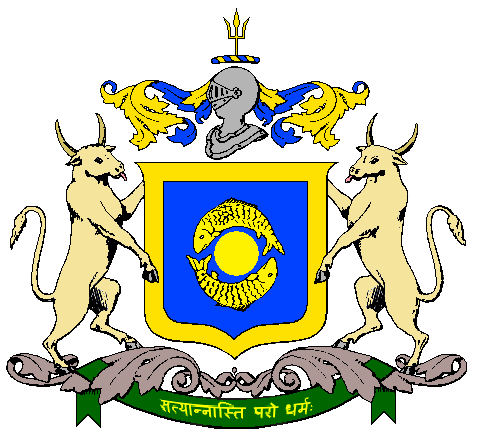

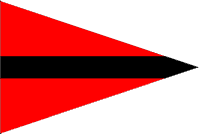
- Flag (1740–1947)
- Country: Banaras State
- Founded: 1709
- Founder: Raja Mansa Ram Singh
- Current head: H.H Maharaja Anant Narayan Singh Bahadur
- Final ruler: Vibhuti Narayan Singh
- Titles: Maharaja of Banaras
- Deposition: 1948

The Narayan dynasty was the ruling family of Benares. Raja Mansaram Singh of Narayan Dynasty had again acquired the kingdom of his ancestors. After seceding from Awadh, Benares emerged as a kingdom of its own, ruled by Maharaja Balwant Singh in year - 1740 AD during the 18th century. Since then, the family ruled Benaras. They Belongs to Bhumihar community. In 1911, Benares became a full-fledged princely state of British India and the Narayan dynasty ruled it as British vassals until they acceded to independent India in 1947.

Even today, the Kashi Naresh, the titular ruler of the dynasty, is deeply revered by the people of Benares. He is Benares's religious head and the people of Benares consider him to have been ordained the throne of Kashi by Shiva. He is also the chief cultural patron and an essential part of all religious celebrations.

== 1709 to 1770 ==
The family tradition goes back to the year 1709, when an ascetic of Utaria, a village near Benares, foretold the succession of his descendants to the dominions then governed by a Hindu raja.

With the decline of the Mughal Empire, the area south of Avadh and the fertile rice growing areas of Benares, Gorakhpur, Deoria, Ghazipur, Ballia, Bihar and the fringes of Bengal, the Bhumihar strengthened their sway on the region. What brought success to these Hindu Bhumihar princelings was the strong clan organization on which they rested. There were perhaps as many as 100,000 Brave Bhumihar clansmen backing the Benares rajas in what later became the districts of Benares, Gorakhpur and Azamgarh. This proved a decisive advantage when the dynasty faced its rival and nominal suzerain, the Nawab of Awadh, in the 1750s and the 1760s. Their support gave the Benares ruler the capacity to mount an exhausting guerrilla war against the Awadh camp using his Bhumihar clan levies which forced the Nawab to withdraw his main force.

=== Raja Mansa Ram Singh ===
Raja Mansa Ram Singh was elder son of Raja Manoranjan Singh, local ruler of Banaras and resident of Gangapur village. In the late 17th century, Raja Mansa Ram Singh entered the service as the Sub ruler of Benares, Rustam Ali Khan (uncle of Sheikh Abdullah Nawab of Ghazipur). The Raja grew immensely powerful, fought many wars and continued to become the King of Beneras under Nawab of Kaswar in the service of the Nazim, recapturing the kingdom of his ancestors which had been lost to Muslim rulers. He was appointed as the successor to Rustam Ali Khan, by the Nawab of Awadh, Saadat Khan, one year before his death in 1739. Impressed with his ability as an able administrator, Mohammed Shah appointed him as both the Raja and Nazim of Benares, Jaunpur, and Chunar to be held by his eldest son along with the title of Raja Bahadur of Kaswar.

=== Maharaja Balwant Singh ===
His eldest son, Rafa'at wa Awal-i-Martabat Maharaja Sri Balwant Singh Sahib Bahadur, succeeded his father as Raja of Kaswar and Nazim of Benares in 1738. Leading a much more martial life, he built a fort and established a capital at Gangapur, but later moved to Ramnagar. In 1751, he expelled the representative of the Nawab of Awadh in an attempt to carve out a principality at Benares, but had to retreat strategically after a fierce direct fight when the Nawab invaded his domain in March 1752; but continued his guerrilla fight and ultimately the Nawab stooped to accept his terms. Resultantly a settlement was made between the two and he was restored to his titles by the Nawab. Emperor Alamgir II granted him a jagir in Bihar two years later. The first to start a tradition of fighting with the East India Company which continued until the formation of India, he joined Shah Alam and Shuja ud-Daula in their 1763 invasion of Bengal.

== Maharaja of Benares: (1770–1939) ==
=== Maharaja Chet Singh ===
Maharaja Balwant Singh's elder son, Rafa'at wa Awal-i-Martabat Maharaja Sri Chet Singh Sahib Bahadur, succeeded to the throne as the next Maharaja of Benares in 1770.The Nawab still wished to hold total suzerainty over the zamindari, the British authorities encouraged him to recognise Chet Singh as ruler in 1773. Two years later, the Nawab, by now fed up with British interference, transferred the domain to the Company under the direct control of the Governor-General of Bengal, Warren Hastings. Under the new British terms, Chet Singh was forced to contribute cavalry and maintenance grants for the company's sepoy battalions. The Raja refused to do this against his own country and he began to secretly correspond with enemies of the Company in hopes of forcibly breaking the increasing control of company in India. The company discovered his plan with the help of some traitors and tried to place him under house arrest in August 1781, pending interview with Hastings.

Hastings came and as the King and his men were waiting for this chance, they defeated Companies mercenaries, killed British officers and arrested Hastings himself, but they were advised by Munshi Sadanand(ancestor of Sampoornanand) against killing Hastings and this proved to be a fetal mistake. Hastings escaped, with the help of the traitors and left Benaras disguised as a woman. This incident gave rise to, "Godhe Pe Hawda, Haathi pe Jeen, Aise Bhaga Warren Hastings". The Raja gathered his small forces, appealing for assistance against Britishers, from local rulers, who, did nothing. Maharaja Chet singh's last hope was the raja of gwalior who also sighed a treaty in which maharaja gave him land, protection and help [human] for making ghats and in return he promised to give troops when needed but he did not held him as maratha has lost their strength after Panipat Battle 1761 AD. In various battles with the company's forces, Chet Singh's troops were defeated, the rebellion crushed with the help of traitors, several patriot warriors fell in battlefields, their family members and innocent citizens were and the state confiscated and given to Avsaan Singh in reward for his treachery, but revolt restarted. Then Company was forced to instate the nephew of Maharaja Chet Singh(son of his sister Maharajkumari Padma Kuwar), Rafa'at wa Awal-i-Martabat Maharaja Sri Mahip Narayan Singh Sahib Bahadur on 14 September 1781 and free his father Babu Durgvijay Singh from their custody who was arrested for assisting Maharaja Chait Singh and fighting against the company. Maharaja Chet Singh was granted a jagir of 500 villages by Mahad - Ji- Sindhiya in respect of his royalty. He died in Gwalior on 29 March 1810, leaving three sons. His Chattri is still at Gwalior. His Decendents are still residing in Gwalior since last 245 years. Raja Prahlad Singh is the head of the family. Present generation has four brothers as Late Raja Suryanath Singh, Raja Prahlad Singh, Babu Prem Singh and Babu Dilip Singh. The Royal family members are serving in Defence, bank, Private sectors, Medical and Kunwar Dhananjay Singh Kashiwale is dealing with real estate in various cities of Madhya Pradesh. Dhirendra Singh Kashiwale and Prateek Singh Kashiwale are employed in Foreign. A descendant of Kashi Naresh Chet Singh named as Sanjay Singh Kashiwale is a Medical Officer in Government Sector.

This incident greatly tarnished Hastings' image and capability, leading to a failed attempt to impeach him by the British parliament.

=== Maharaja Mahip Narayan Singh ===
Maharaja Chait Singh's nephew, Mahip Narayan Singh, succeeded his maternal uncle on 14 September 1781 under the terms of the East India Company, which were that he should serve to dispense justice within his domains and make an annual contribution of 40 lakhs. He continued his family tradition of tussles with the British, who in turn labeled him incapable of governing because he refused to levy any taxes on farmers and refused to assist East India Company in draining wealth from India towards England. Therefore, on 27 October 1794, under a formal agreement, the four revenue districts held by the Maharaja were transferred to the direct rule of the East India Company administration, leaving only the family domains under the rule of the Maharaja. In return, Mahip Narayan Singh received 1 lakh per year in compensation and any surplus revenue from the revenue districts. Mahip Narayan Singh died in 1796 and was succeeded by his eldest son Udit Narayan Singh.

=== Maharaja Udit Narayan Singh ===
The eldest surviving son of Maharaj Mahip Narayan Singh, Udit Narayan Singh Sahib Bahadur (1770 – 4 April 1835, r. 12 September 1795 – 4 April 1835) became the new king of Benares. He was a nationalist and a benevolent ruler who refused to bow down against the anarchy and corruption of the company. He was even more averse to British dominion than his father and had regular confrontations with the company, who, in spite, falsely labelled him as an incapable administrator. He added grandeur to and formed the present shape of the world famous Ramlila of Ramnagar which was a low key affair at that time. He like his father did not levy taxes on farmers and he established checkpoints which took taxes according to the amount of goods which were taken to the city for selling and trading to encourage trade in finished goods so as to check the drain of wealth from India. He was loved and revered by his people who established his statue at the Girija Bagh temple in PAC campus Ramnagar[ which is also a part of Ramlila at Ramnagar]. Britishers were not able to tolerate him so conspired against him and under false charges confiscated all thy lands of Benaras State and started ruthlessly exploiting the peasants. Unable to spectate it silently, the Maharaja, in 1828, petitioned the company to annul the 1794 agreement under which the Benaras State had lost the sarkars, and to press for their return to State control. However, the company, in accordance with its colonial intent, ordered a sham inquiry into Maharaj Udit Narayan Singh's personal affairs and his governance. As expected, the report backed the false charges of mismanagement.The company, taking advantage of its own fraud, confiscated the last remaining lands of the Maharaja and placed them under their own control which were sold into permanent settlement as Zamindaries. However the Maharaja purchased these Zamindaries(all 96 Parganas)back,from under the table, and had the last laugh. He built the first dam of UP for advancement of agriculture. Maharaja Udit Narayan Singh Saheb Bahadur ascended to Baikunth on 4 April 1835, aged 65, and was succeeded by his adopted son, Maharaja Ishwari Prasad Narayan Singh Sahib Bahadur.

=== Maharaja Ishwari Prasad Narayan Singh ===
Ishwari Prasad Narayan Singh succeeded his adoptive father at the age of 13 in 1835, becoming the first of his line to be granted the title of Maharaja. During the Indian Rebellion of 1857, he remained neutral to revolt for the welfare of his people as he has not forgotten the treachery of his countrymen in battle against Hastings. As a reward, he was promoted to the rank of Maharaja Bahadur in 1859.

In 1867, he was granted a personal 13-gun salute; a decade later he was knighted with the GCSI, becoming Sir Ishwari. He eventually became a member of the Viceroy's Legislative Council and in the crowning achievement of his reign, restored all the family lands that had been lost to them for over a century. He was a poet-scholar and established the Sanskrit College in Varanasi (now Sampurnanand Sanskrit University). He donated charity for digging a well at a drought stricken village of Oxford, still known as Maharaja's well. He was the mentor of Bhartendu Harischandra, father of modern Hindi. He was a disciple of Dev Swami and Shyamacharan Lahiri Mahashay. He started the first Hindi theater and founded the Benares School of Art. He was given the title of His Highness in 1889. He was succeeded by his adopted son Prabhu Narayan Singh.

=== Maharaja Prabhu Narayan Singh ===
Prabhu Narayan Singh would reign for 42 years as Maharaja; in 1891, he was knighted with the KCIE, later becoming an honorary colonel in the Indian Army. In 1911, he became the first Maharaja of the newly created princely state of Benares, including the parganas of Bhadohi and Keramnagar, Chakia and Ramnagar, together with certain limited rights within the City of Benares. He was also granted 15 gun salute .He donated 1300 acres of land to establish famous Banaras Hindu University.He donated land at Kamacha, Varanasi to Annie Besant for establishment of Hindu College which she donated for establishment of Banaras Hindu University (BHU). He was a great scholar and well versed in Sanskrit, Persian and English. Established Iswari Memorial Hospital for reducing mother-child mortality during childbirth. Continued the tradition of Saint Kings and got operated without anaesthesia by going into Yog-Samadhi. He died in 1931, aged 75, Maharaja Sir Prabhu Narayan was succeeded by his only son, Sir Aditya Narayan Singh.

=== Maharaja Aditya Narayan Singh ===
Maharaja Aditya Narayan Singh would reign for only seven and a half years before dying in 1939, aged 64, but in this short period of time established Colleges for higher education at Gyanpur, Bhadohi. He was a great visionary and provided for free education to all at all stages including higher education. He established many Sanskrit schools. He established free Hospitals at Ramnagar and Badohi. He established a college in the name of his father where free education of great quality was provided to all. the quality of education can be assessed by the fact that his own adopted son studied in the same college with the other children as having had no children, Maharaja Aditya Narayan Singh had adopted a distant cousin to succeed him. He was a great patron of education and He also gave his private land for the maintenance of expenditure of BHU in Sunderpur which was given by the state for his personal expenses.

=== Maharaja Vibhuti Narayan Singh ===
Maharaja Vibhuti Narayan Singh, as he was to be known was born on 5 November 1927, the great-nephew of Maharani of Maharaja Sir Prabhu Narayan Singh. In 1934, when he was six years old, he was adopted by Maharaja Sir Aditya Narayan Singh of Benares, becoming heir apparent and receiving a new name, Maharaj Kumar Vibhuti Narayan Singh. Five years later, the old Maharaja died, and Maharaja Vibhuti Narayan Singh became Maharaja under a regency until he succeeded to the throne in his own right as Maharaja on 11 July 1947, a month before India's independence. On 15 August, Maharaja Vibhuti Narayan signed the Instrument of Accession to India. On 15 October 1947, he merged Benares into the new Indian state of Uttar Pradesh. This marked the end of Maharaja Vibhuti Narayan Singh's short reign, although he would maintain his titles for many more years.

A deeply religious believer in, and scholar of, the Vedas and Puranas, Maharaja Vibhuti Narayan Singh strictly adhered to orthodox Hindu customs. Despite the decision of the Indira Gandhi government to abolish the titles of the Indian monarchs on 28 December 1971, he remained deeply respected for the remainder of his life. A distinguished scholar of Sanskrit, Puranas and the Vedas, he presided over a number of scholastic, religious and charitable institutions, including a term from 1992 until his death as Chancellor of Benares Hindu University, and took part in public religious ceremonies in the City of Benares. At his death on 25 December 2000, aged 73, he had 4 children, 3 daughters and a son; Maharaj Kumari Shri Vishnu Priya, Maharaj Kumari Shri Hari Priya, Maharaj Kumari Shri Krishna Priya and the youngest being Maharaj Kunwar Anant Narayan Singh Kashi Naresh Anant Narayan Singh is the current titular head of Narayan Dynasty.

== Philanthropy ==
The Maharajah of Benares funded the construction of a well, adorned with a golden elephant, and a cherry orchard in the southern English village of Chiltern Hills, after hearing of a drought in the area.

== See also ==
- Ramnagar Fort
