= Gangapur, Varanasi =

Gangapur
- Town
- Location in Varanasi District, Uttar Pradesh, India
- Coordinates: 25.290466°N 82.871042°E
- Country: India
- State: Uttar Pradesh
- District: Varanasi
- Elevation: 448 m (1,470 ft)

Population (2001)
  - Total: 6,388

Languages
  - Official: Hindi
  - Regional: Bhojpuri
- Time zone: UTC+5:30 (IST)
- Vehicle registration: UP
- Website: up.gov.in

Gangapur is a town and a nagar panchayat in Varanasi district in the state of Uttar Pradesh, India. It was the capital of Gautam Bhumihars. The town has a redstone fort built by Balawant Singh, which is now utilised as an educational campus.

== Demographics ==
As of the 2001 Census of India, Gangapur had a population of 6,388. Males constitute 53% of the population and females 47%. Gangapur has an average literacy rate of 55%, lower than the national average of 59.5%: male literacy is 63%, and female literacy is 46%. In Gangapur, 20% of the population is under 6 years of age.
