= Taljhari (disambiguation) =

Taljhari refers to a community development block in Sahibganj district, Jharkhand, India

It also refers to:

- Taljhari, Sahibganj, a village in Sahibganj district, Jharkhand, India
- Taljhari, Dumka, a village in Dumka district, Jharkhand, India
