= Rajmahal =

- Town
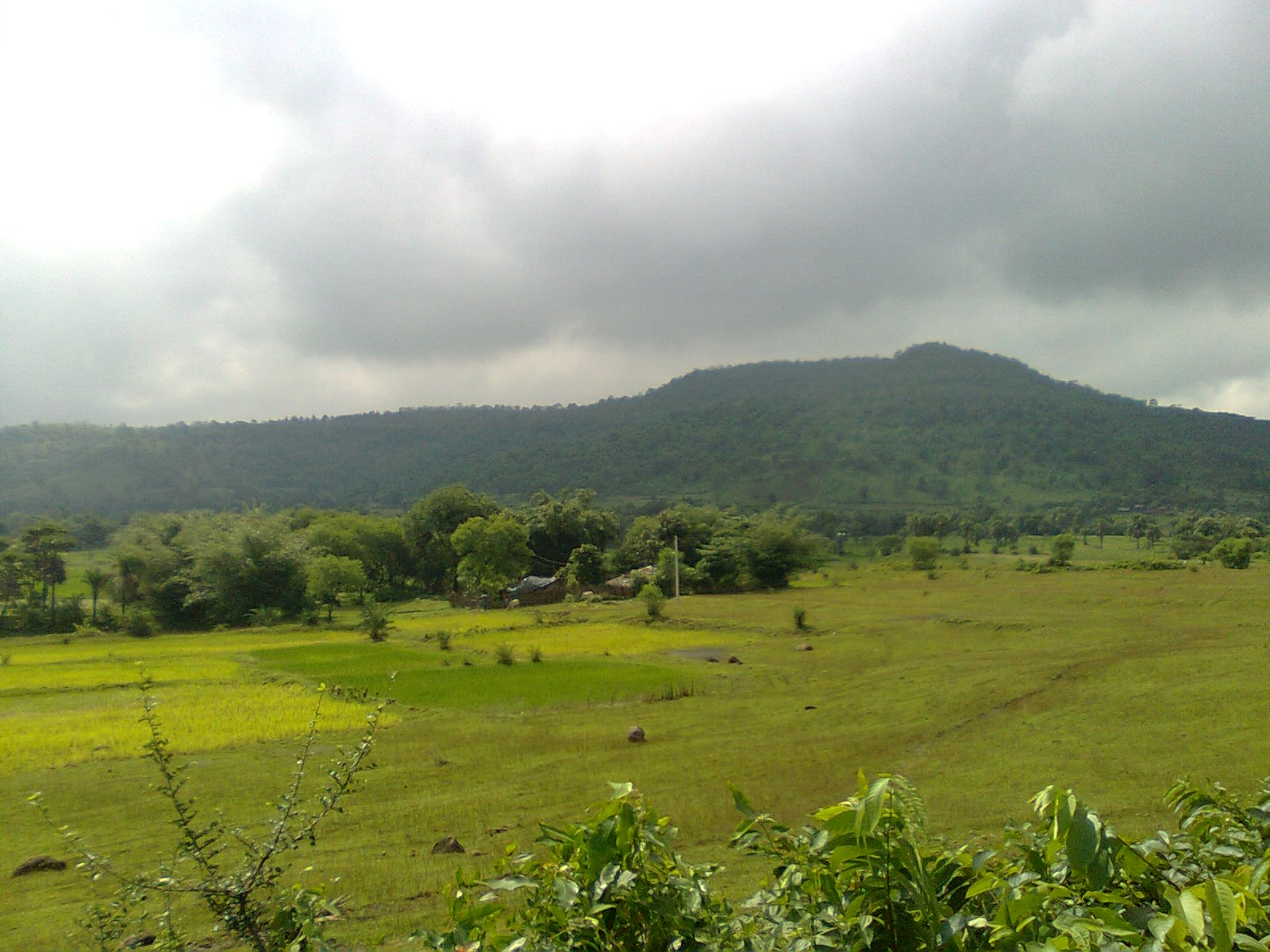

- Location in Jharkhand, India Rajmahal (India)
- Coordinates: 25.05°N 87.84°E
- Country: India
- State: Jharkhand
- District: Sahibganj

Population (2011)
  - Total: 22,514

Languages (*For language details see Rajmahal (community development block)#Language and religion)
  - Official: Hindi
- Time zone: UTC+5:30 (IST)
- Vehicle registration: JH

Rajmahal is a subdivisional town and a notified area in Rajmahal subdivision of the Sahebganj district in the Indian state of Jharkhand. It is situated at the banks of Ganges and was former capital of Bengal Subah under Mughal governor, Man Singh I.

== Geography ==
Cities, towns and locations in the Sahibganj, Godda and Pakur districts in Santhal Pargana Division
M: municipality, CT: census town, R: rural/ urban centre, H: historical/ religious/ tourist centre
Owing to space constraints in the small map, the actual locations in a larger map may vary slightly

=== Area ===
Rajmahal has an area of 7.5 square kilometres (2.9 sq mi).

=== Overview ===
The map shows a hilly area with the Rajmahal hills running from the bank of the Ganges in the extreme north to the south, beyond the area covered by the map into Dumka district. ‘Farakka’ is marked on the map and that is where Farakka Barrage is, just inside West Bengal. Rajmahal coalfield is shown in the map. The entire area is overwhelmingly rural with only small pockets of urbanisation.

Note: The full-screen map is interactive. All marked locations contain hyperlinks that navigate directly to their corresponding pages. Enlarging the map displays additional infrastructure details, including railway lines and secondary road networks.

== History ==
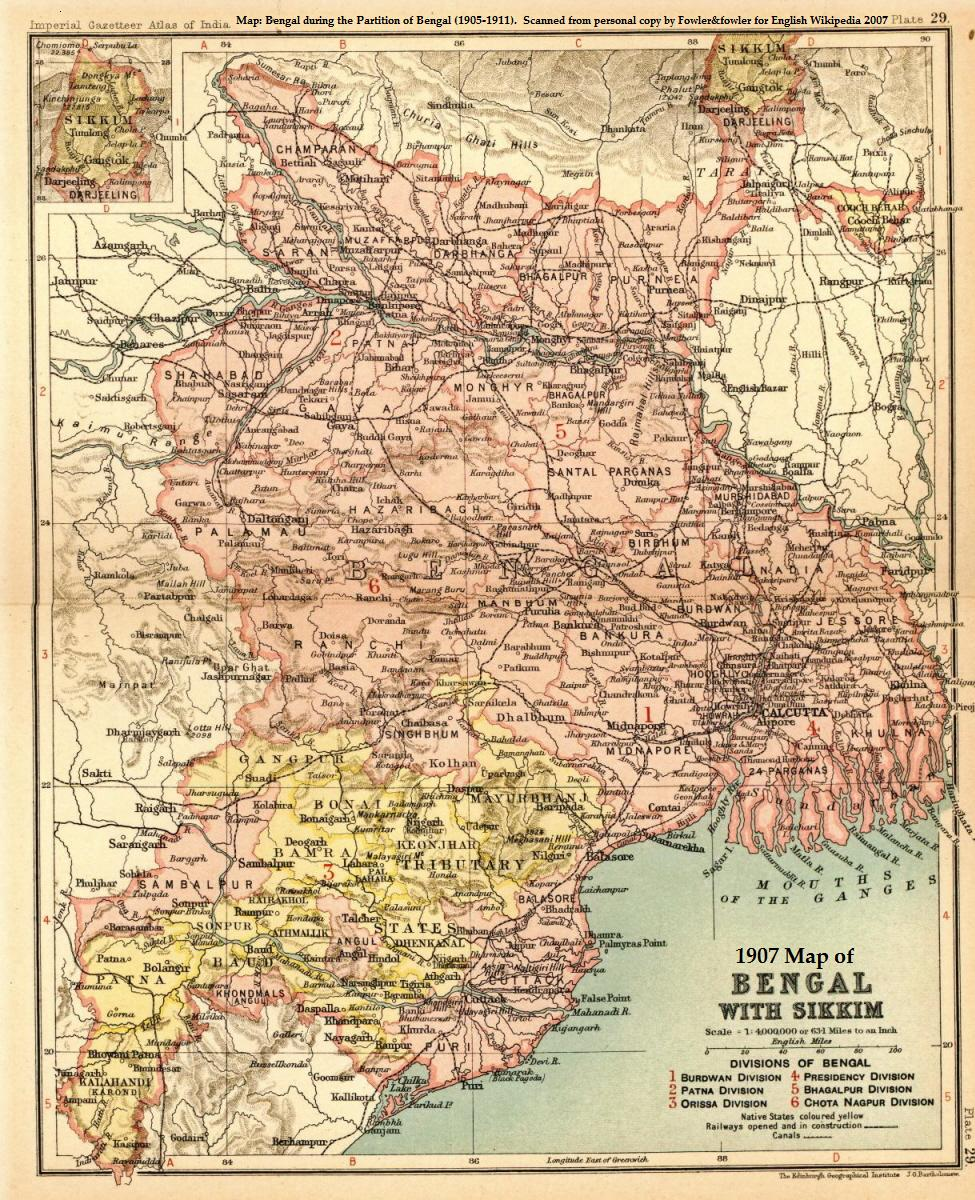
1907 Map of Bengal with Sikkim

Rajmahal region was earlier ruled by Raja Mal sub-group of Mal Paharia tribes. Earlier this place was known as "Agmahal" and is surrounded by Rajmahal hills on one side and river Ganges on another side. The region was also known as 'Daman-i-Koh' during Mughal rule.

In 1576, Battle of Rajmahal was fought between Mughal Emperor, Akbar and Sultan of Bengal, Daud Khan Karrani of Karrani Dynasty. After war, Daud Khan was captured and later executed by the Mughals.

Later, after the conquest of Odisha in 1592, Raja Man Singh I, Mughal governor of Bengal Subah came to Rajmahal. He chose the site for his capital in 1595–96 because of its strategic command of the Teliagarhi Pass and the Ganges River. Raja Man Singh I, also renamed the town in 1595 as 'Akbarnagar' in tribute to Emperor Akbar and he also constructed palace, garden and mosque on behalf of Mughal rulers. In 1610, the capital of Bengal was transferred to Dacca (now Dhaka, Bangladesh) by Islam Khan.

In 1639, Rajmahal regained its glory and was once more made the capital of Bengal by Shah Shuja, governor of Bengal Subah and second son of Emperor Shah Jahan. It continued as the seat of the Mughal Viceroy up to 1660 and a mint town till 1661.

In 1757, Battle of Plassey was fought between Robert Clive and Nawab of Bengal, Siraj-ud-Daulah where Nawab lost the war due to treachery of Mir Jafar and he fled from Murshidabad towards Patna. During his halt at Rajmahal, Siraj-ud-Daulah was captured by Mir Jafar's son Miran and was murdered at the site.

Battle of Udhwa nala at Rajmahal was fought between Mir Qasim, and British in 1763. Nawab Mir Qasim was defeated by the British and fled with his family to the Rohtas (Bihar), but was not able to hide at the Rohtasgarh Fort.

During British rule, Permanent Settlement was passed in 1793 and it forced the landlords to improve productivity of the land. The Santals were increasingly used for land reclamation and improvement and further Santals got permanently settled in the region. British also constructed Neel-Kothi for process and storage of Neel (Indigo) which was used for dying cotton cloth.

Later, Daman-i-Koh became the origin of Santhal Rebellion and leaders like Sidhu and Kanhu Murmu, Chand and Bhairab, etc. and they fought against the British colonial authority and the corrupt zamindari system mobilizing more than 10,000 Santhals.

== Geology ==
Plant Fossil bearing Inter-trappean beds of Rajmahal Formation nearby has been declared the National Geological Monuments of India by the Geological Survey of India (GSI), for their protection, maintenance, promotion and enhancement of geotourism.

== Demographics ==
According to the 2011 Census of India, Rajmahal had a total population of 22,514, of which 11,755 (52%) were males and 10,730 (48%) were females. Population in the age range 0–6 years was 3,985. The total number of literate persons in Rajmhal was 11,618 (62.70% of the population over 6 years).

Religions Rajmahal (2011)
Hinduism	52.59%
Islam	47.09%
Christianity	0.24%
Others	0.08%
Distribution of religions

=== Languages ===
Languages spoken in Rajmahal Town (2011)
1. Hindi (72.6%)
2. Bengali (19.6%)
3. Urdu (3.69%)
4. Khortha (1.87%)
5. Bhojpuri (1.27%)
6. Others (0.32%)

== Infrastructure ==
According to the District Census Handbook 2011, Sahibganj, Rajmahal covered an area of 7.5 km^{2}. Among the civic amenities, it had 10 km roads with both open and closed drains, the protected water supply involved hand pump, uncovered well. It had 4,025 domestic electric connections, 456 road lighting points. Among the medical facilities, it had 3 hospitals, 2 dispensaries, 2 health centres, 1 family welfare centre, 6 maternity and child welfare centres, 1 maternity home, 1 TB hospital/ clinic, 1 nursing home, 1 charitable hospital/ nursing home, 1 veterinary hospital, 20 medicine shops. Among the educational facilities it had 15 primary schools, 6 middle schools, 2 secondary schools, 2 senior secondary schools, 1 general degree college, 1 non-formal education centre (Sarva Sikhsha Abhiyan). Among the social, cultural and recreational facilities, it had 2 cinema theatres, 2 auditorium/ community halls, 2 public libraries, 2 reading rooms. Three important commodities it produced were china clay products, electrical goods, wooden goods. It had the branch offices of 3 nationalised banks, 1 private commercial bank, 1 cooperative bank, 2 agricultural credit society.

== Tourist attractions ==
- Teliagarhi Fort, It was built by family of Teli Zamindar before Islamic rule in the region. Teliagarhi is also called 'Ancient Gateway of Bengal'.
- The Jami Mosque, built in reign of Emperor Akbar at Mangalhat
- Baradari, build by Fateh Jung khan, a wealthy zamindar of Bengal. Half of the structure was bombed by Mughal governor, Man Singh.
- Akbari Mosque built in 1556 by Mughal governor, Man Singh I
- Palace of Shah Shuja, consists Singhi Dalan, a marble pavilion facing the river Ganges
- Palace of Mīr Qasīm, Nawab of Bengal.
- Tomb of Maina-Bibi, built in 1779. Historian H.M Qureshi has identified the tomb with Munni Begum, who was a Begum of the harem of Nawab Mir Jaffer of Bengal
- Tomb of Miran, son of Mir Jafar, Nawab of Bengal
- Neel Kothi, built by British
- Taksal of Jagat Seth, notable banker of Bengal
- Kanhaiyasthan, It is believed that the place was visited by Chaitanya Mahaprabhu
- Shivgadi, a cave temple of Hindu god, Shiva
- Bhognadih, the place where Santhal Rebellion initiated, a monument is also erected on the place and every year Shaheed Mela is organised
- Moti Jharna waterfalls
- Udhwa Bird Sanctuary

== Rajmahal paintings gallery ==
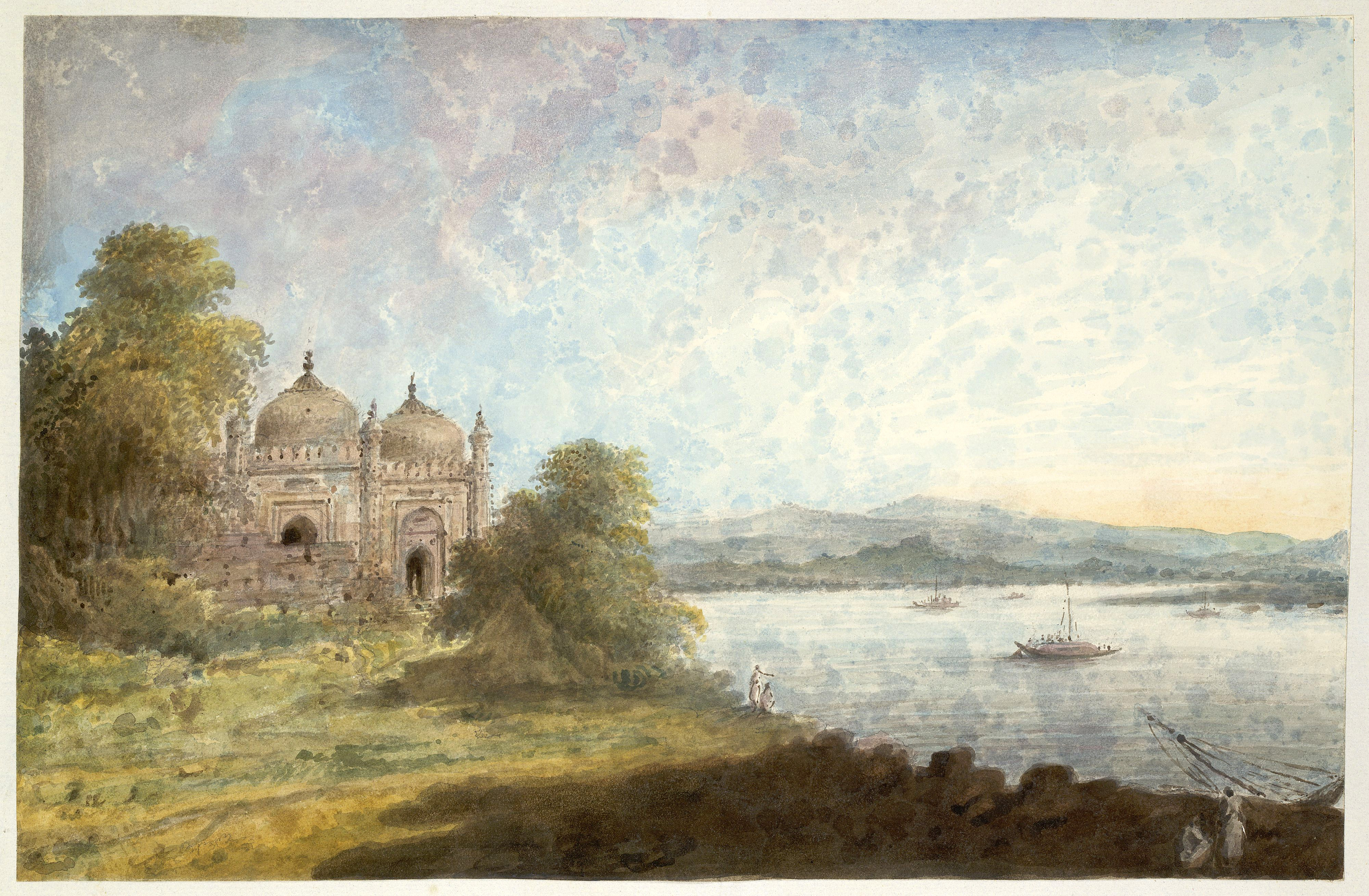
Akbari mosque overlooking the Ganges at Rajmahal

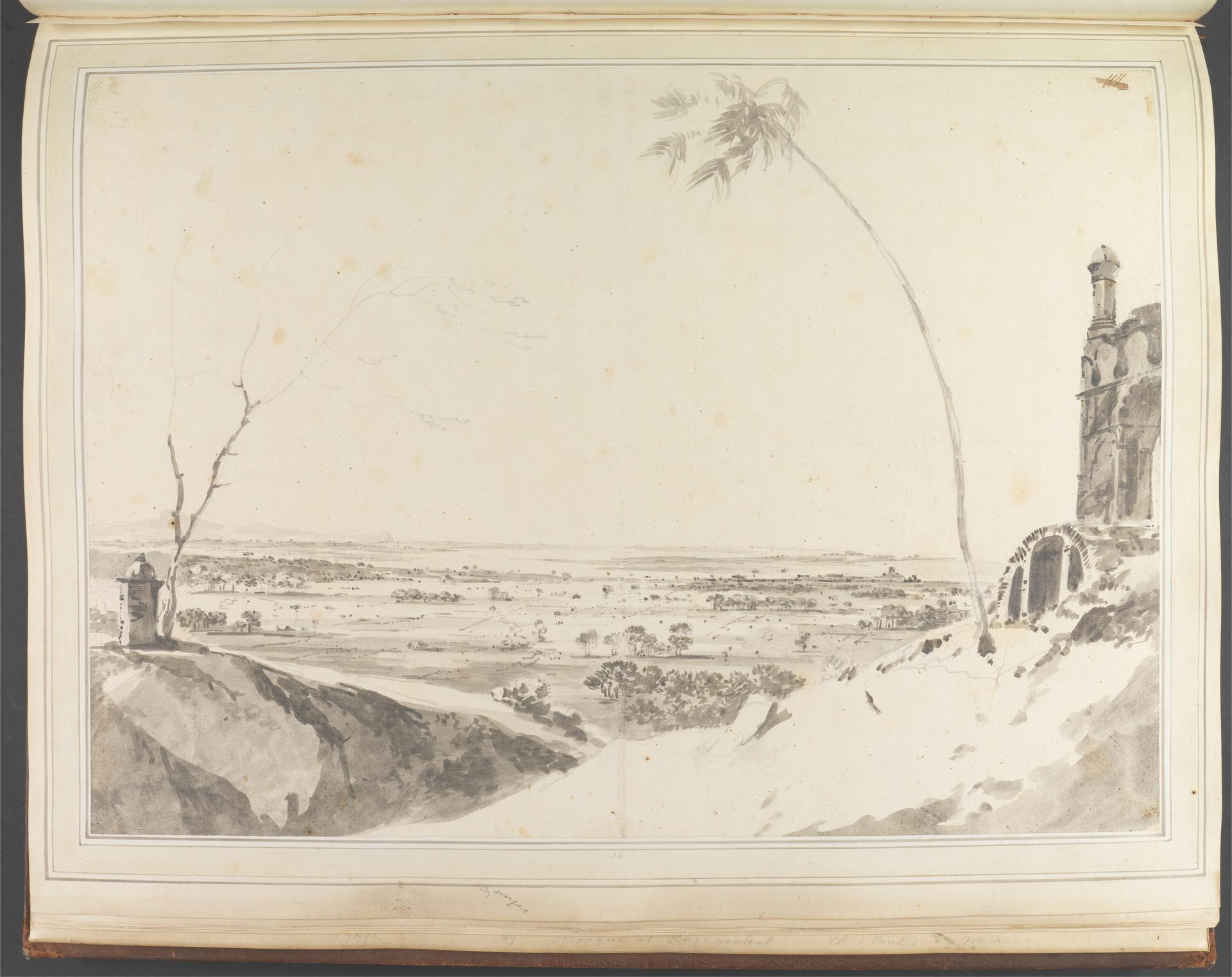
Tomb and Distant View of the Rajmahal Hills, William Hodges, Yale Center for British Art

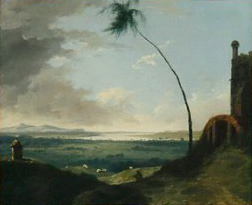
Tomb with a distant view of the Rajmahal hills by William Hodges

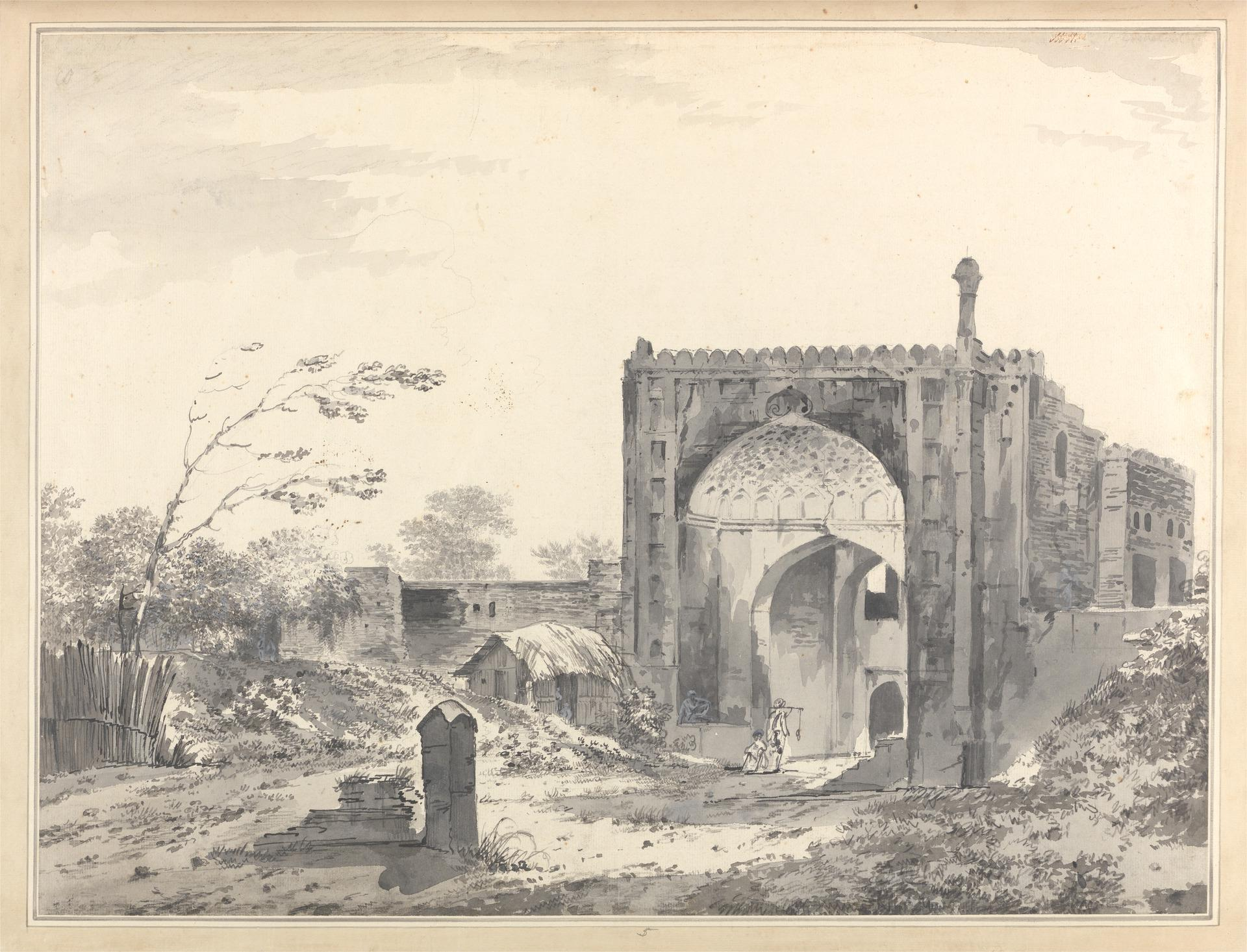
A View of the Gate of the Caravan Serai at Rajmahal, William Hodges, Yale Center for British Art

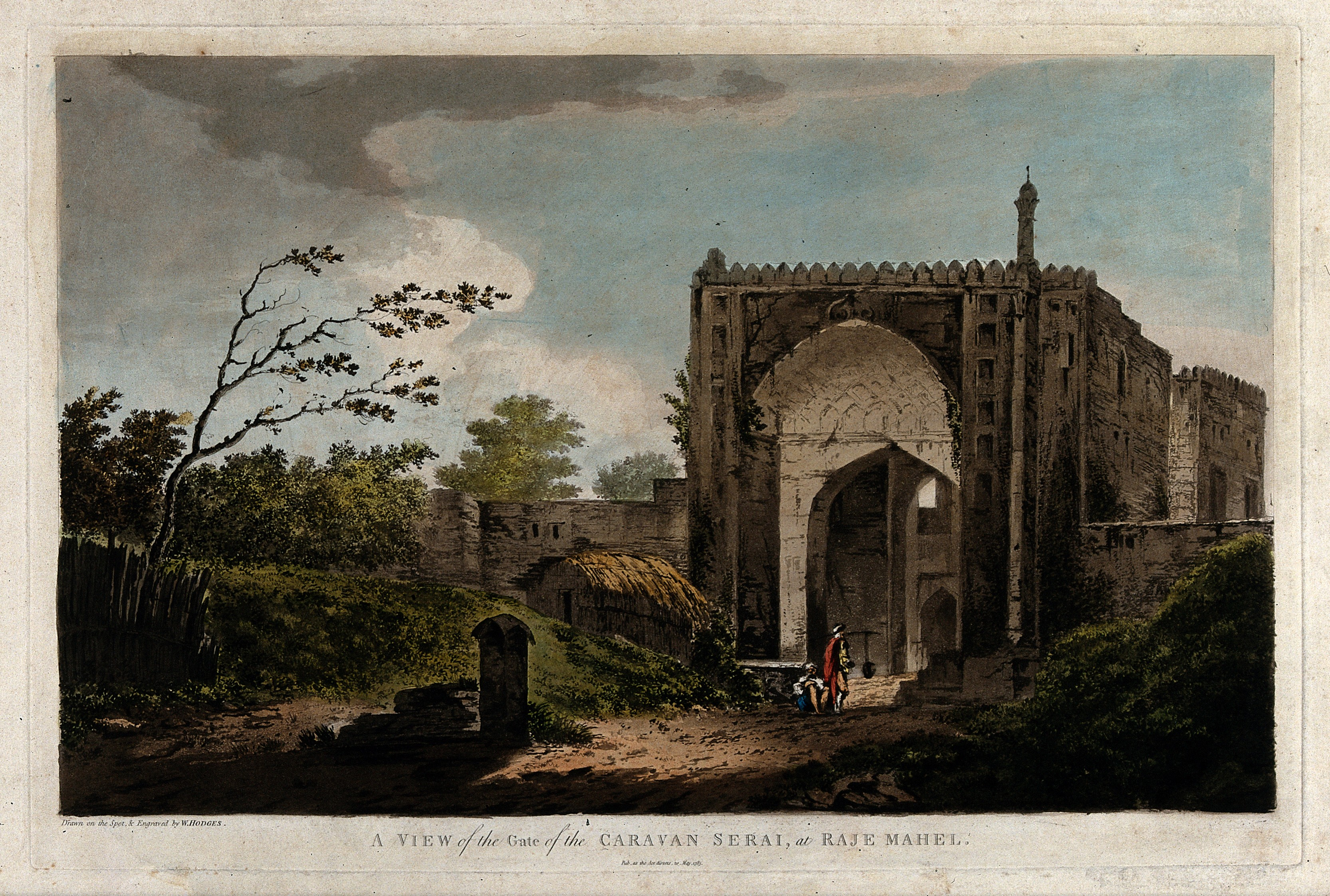
Gateway to a caravan serai at Rajmhal by William Hodges

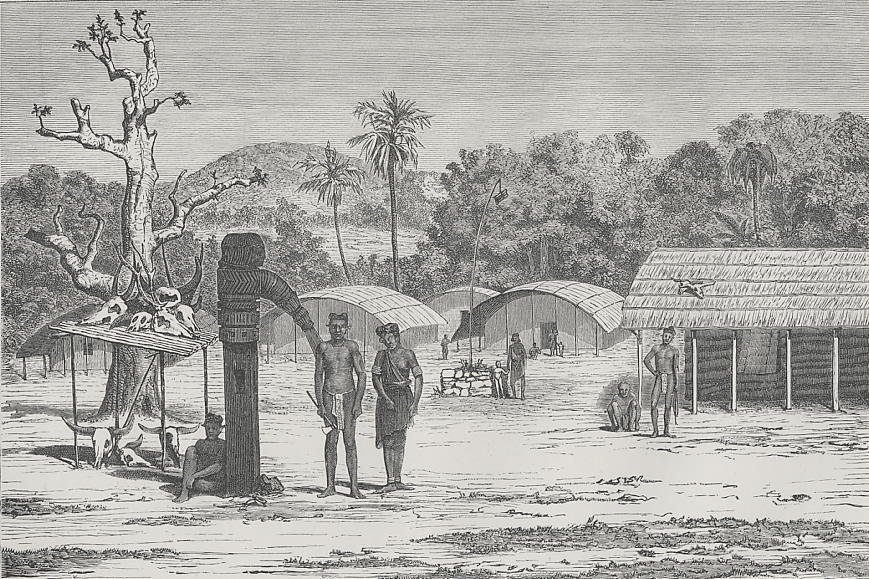
Santal village at Rajmahal (wood etching)

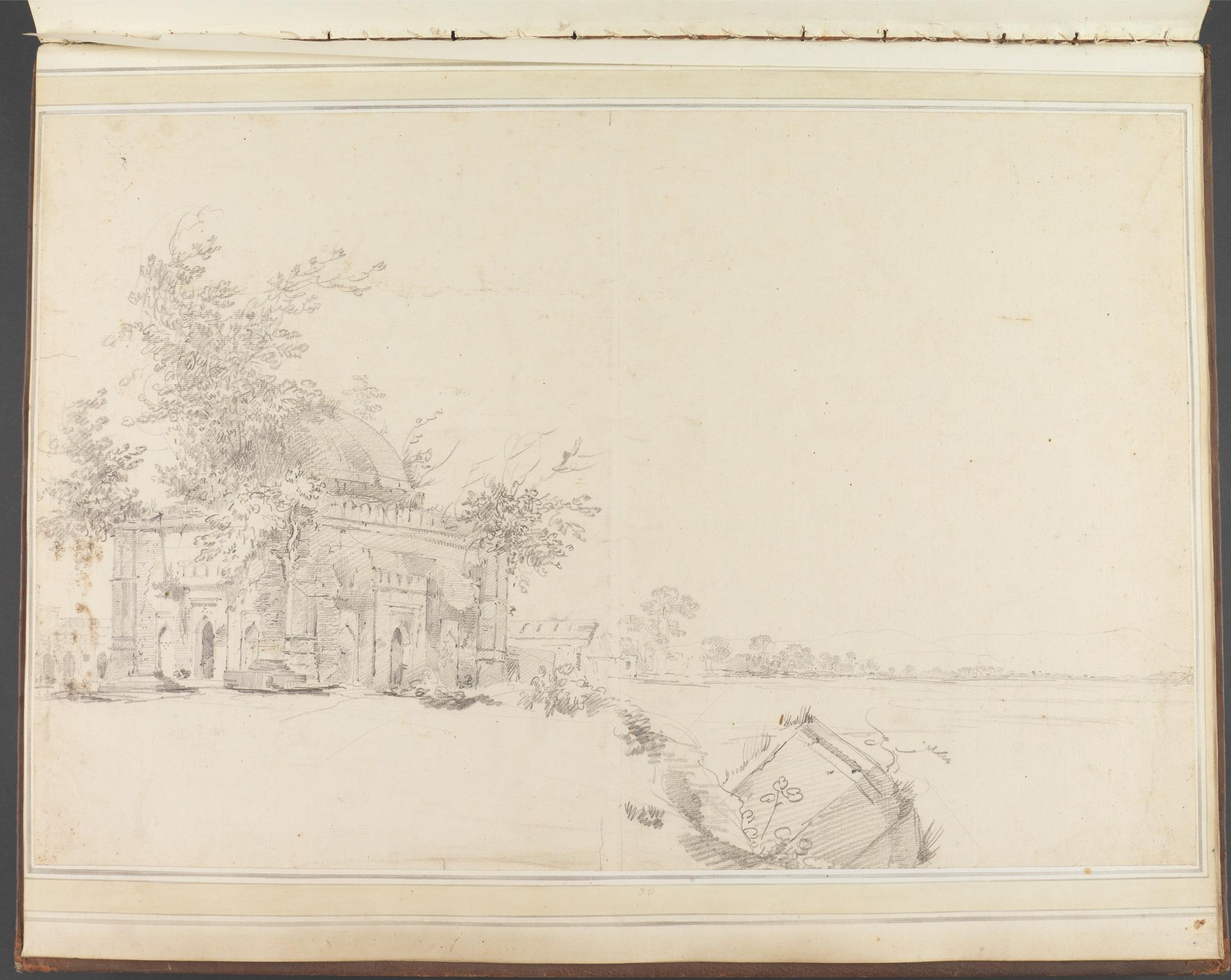
View of a Mausoleum at Rajmahal, 1781, William Hodges, Yale Center for British Art

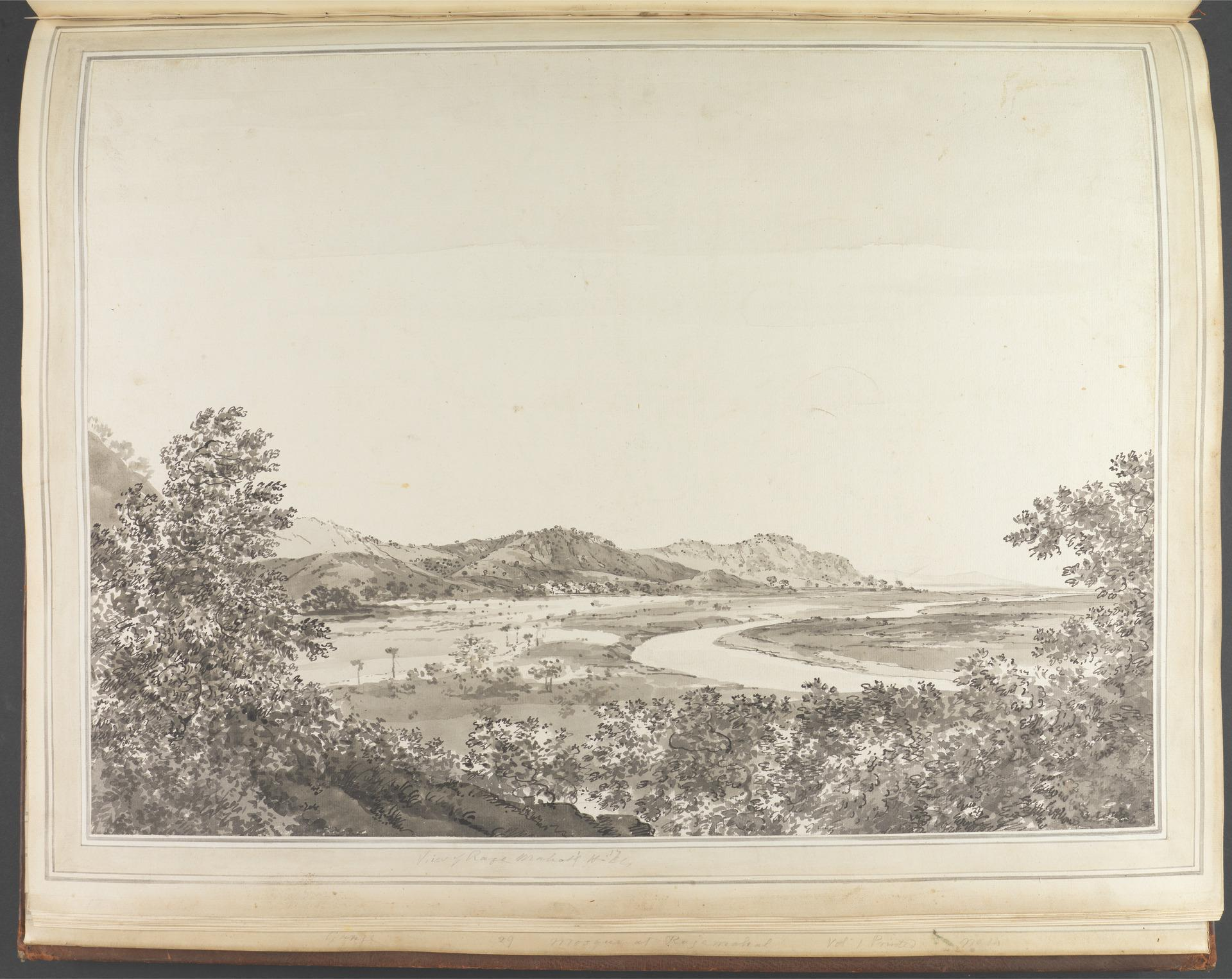
View of the Rajmahal Hills, 1782, William Hodges, Yale Center for British Art

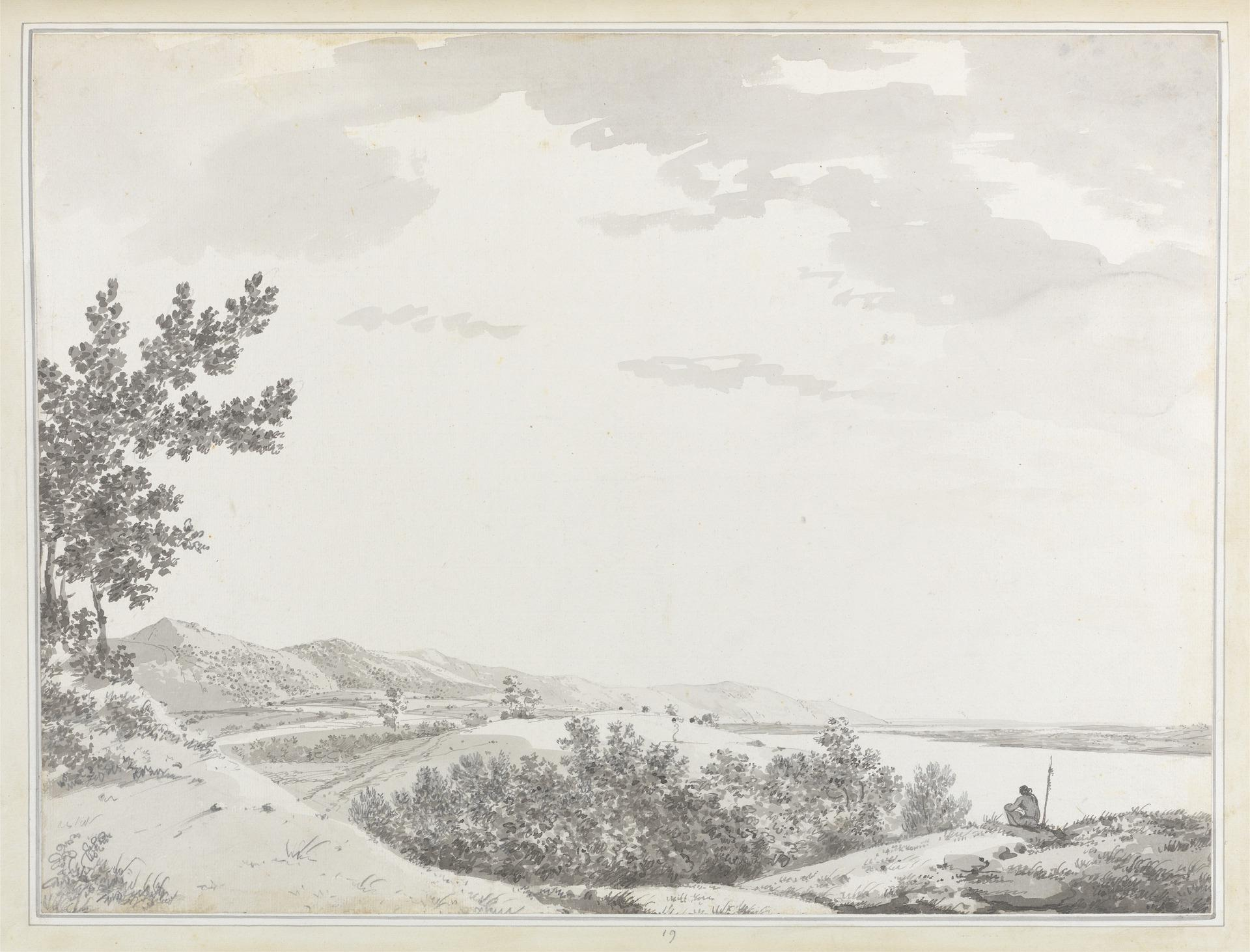
View of the Rajmahal Hills With a Sentenial in the Foreground, William Hodges, Yale Center for British Art

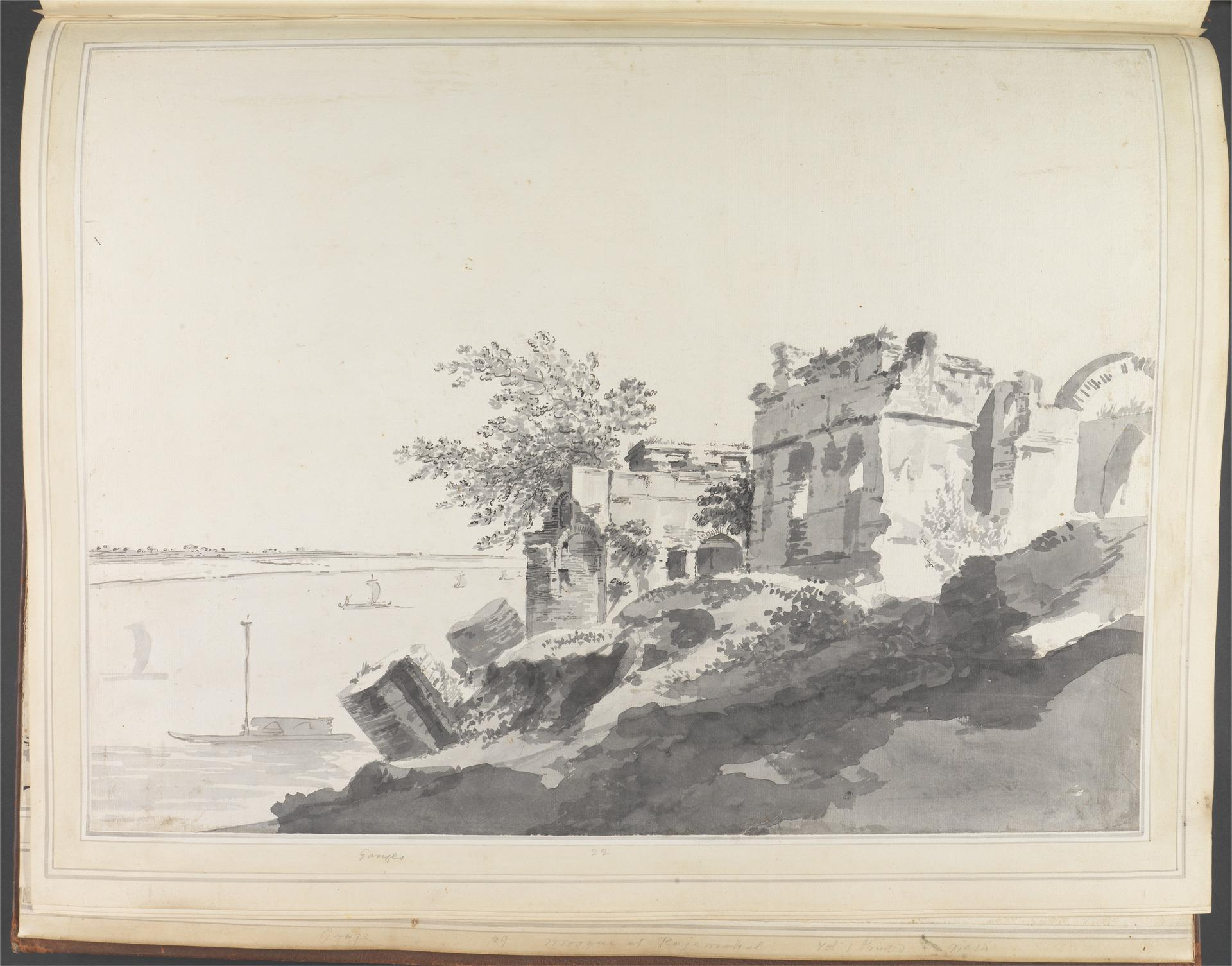
Ruins of Prince Shuja's Palace at Rajmahal, William Hodges, Yale Center for British Art

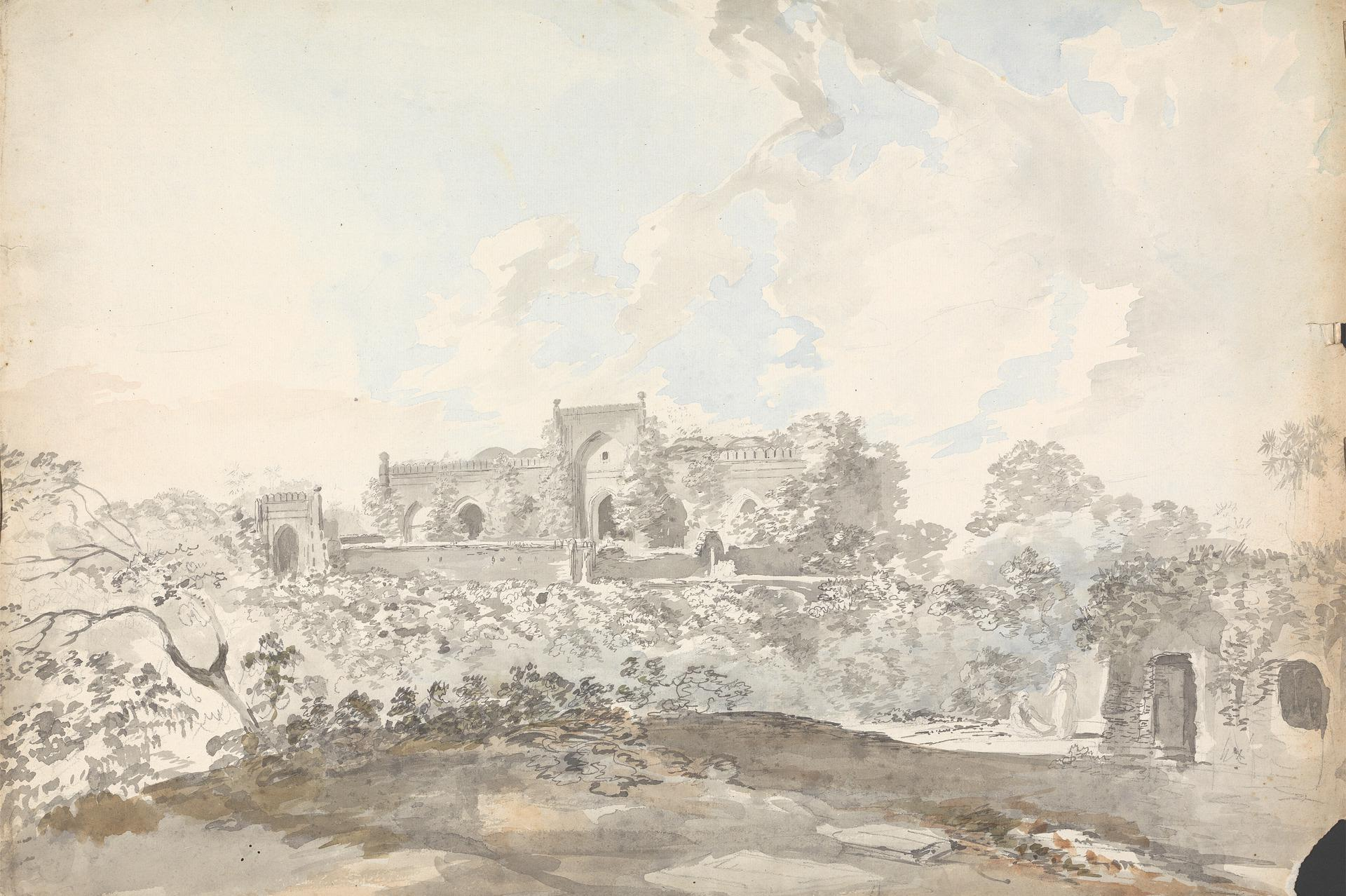
Old Mosque at Rajemahl, Samuel Davis, Yale Center for British Art

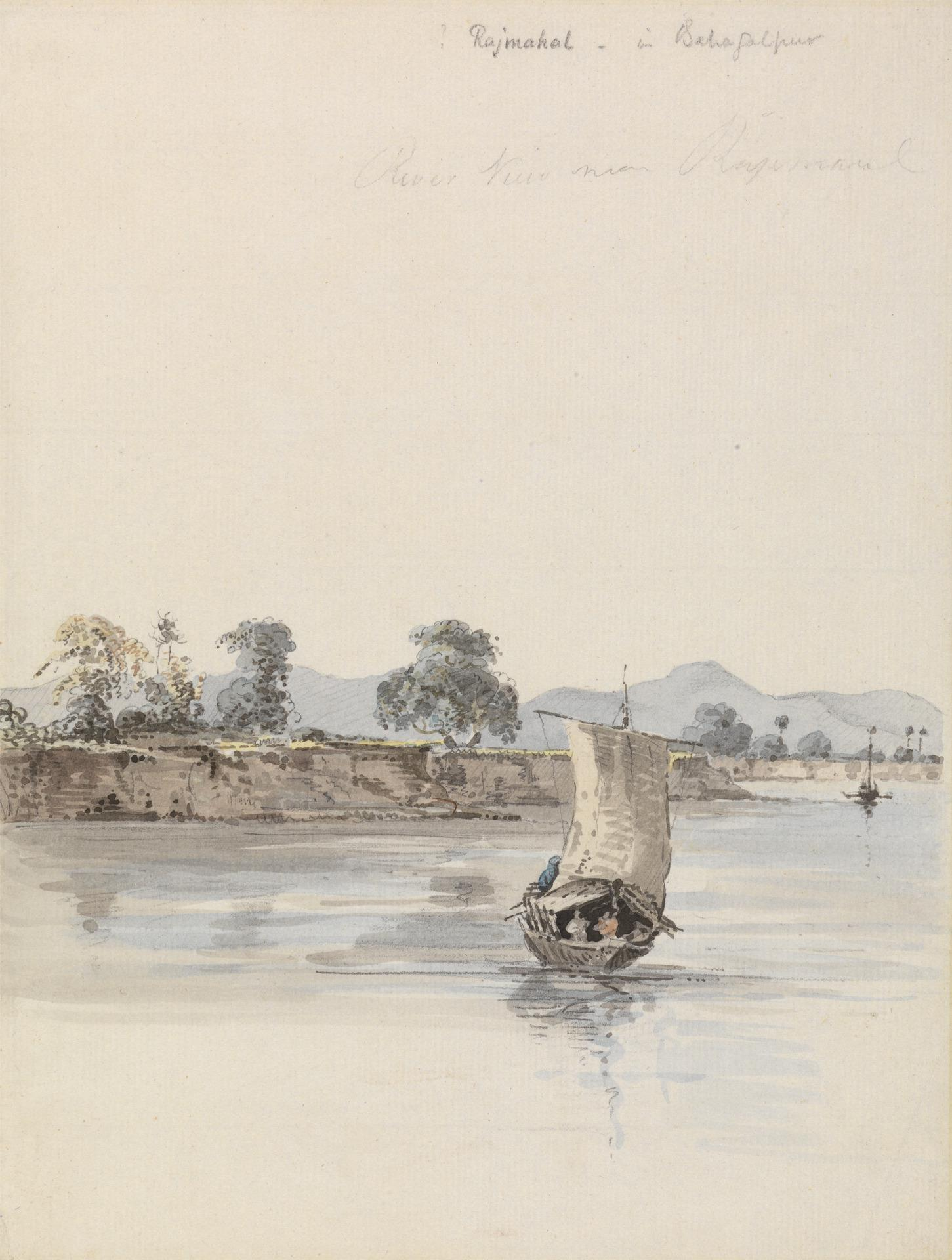
River View near Rajmahal, Samuel Davis, Yale Center for British Art

== Administration ==
=== Assembly segments ===
Presently, Rajmahal Lok Sabha constituency comprises the following six Vidhan Sabha (legislative assembly) segments:

Constituency number	Name	Reserved for (SC/ST/None)	District
1	Rajmahal	None	Sahebganj
2	Borio	ST	Sahebganj
3	Barhait	ST	Sahebganj
4	Litipara	ST	Pakur
5	Pakaur	None	Pakur
6	Maheshpur	ST	Pakur

=== Members of Parliament ===
The Rajmahal (Lok Sabha constituency) is centered around the city and Vijay Kumar Hansdak is the M.P of the region from Jharkhand Mukti Morch.

== See also ==
- Rajmahal hills
- Battle of Rajmahal
- Sahebganj district
