= Radhanagar, Sahibganj =

Radhnagar
- Village
- Location in Jharkhand, India Radhnagar (India)
- Coordinates: 24.876778°N 87.879167°E
- Country: India
- State: Jharkhand
- District: Sahibganj

Population (2011)
  - Total: 6,330

Languages (*For language details see Udhwa (community development block)#Language and religion)
  - Official: Hindi, Urdu
- Time zone: UTC+5:30 (IST)
- PIN: 816101
- Telephone/ STD code: 06426
- Lok Sabha constituency: Rajmahal
- Vidhan Sabha constituency: Rajmahal
- Website: sahibganj.nic.in

Radhanagar is a village in the Udhwa CD block in the Rajmahal subdivision of the Sahibganj district in the Indian state of Jharkhand.

== Geography ==
Cities, towns and locations in the Sahibganj, Godda and Pakur districts in Santhal Pargana Division
M: municipality, CT: census town, R: rural/ urban centre, H: historical/ religious/ tourist centre
Owing to space constraints in the small map, the actual locations in a larger map may vary slightly

=== Location ===
Radhanagar is located at 24.876778°N 87.879167°E.

Radhanagar has an area of 126.82 hectares (313.4 acres).

=== Overview ===
The map shows a hilly area with the Rajmahal hills running from the bank of the Ganges in the extreme north to the south, beyond the area covered by the map into Dumka district. ‘Farakka’ is marked on the map and that is where Farakka Barrage is, just inside West Bengal. Rajmahal coalfield is shown in the map. The entire area is overwhelmingly rural with only small pockets of urbanisation.

== Demographics ==
According to the 2011 Census of India, Radhanagar a total population of 6,330, of which 3,224 (51%) were males and 3,106 (49%) were females. Population in the age range 0–6 years was 1,267. The total number of literate persons in Radhanagar was 2,274 (44.91% of the population over 6 years).

== Civic administration ==
=== Police station ===
Radhanagar police station serves the Udhwa CD block.

== Education ==
Radhanagar High School is a Hindi-medium coeducational institution established in 1966. It has facilities for teaching in classes IX and X.
