= Pathna =

- Community development block
- Location in Jharkhand Pathna (India)
- Coordinates: 24°50′30.7″N 87°45′21.5″E
- Country: India
- State: Jharkhand
- District: Sahibganj

Government
  - Type: Federal democracy

Area
  - Total: 171.39 km^{2} (66.17 sq mi)
- Elevation: 38 m (125 ft)

Population (2011)
  - Total: 81,940
  - Density: 478.1/km^{2} (1,238/sq mi)

Languages
  - Official: Hindi, Urdu

Literacy (2011)
  - Total literates: 31,527 (47.71%)
- Time zone: UTC+5:30 (IST)
- PIN: 816110 (Pathna)
- Telephone/STD code: 06435
- Vehicle registration: JH 18
- Lok Sabha constituency: Rajmahal
- Vidhan Sabha constituency: Rajmahal
- Website: sahibganj.nic.in

Pathna is a community development block that forms an administrative division in the Rajmahal subdivision of the Sahibganj district, Jharkhand state, India.

== Geography ==
Pathna (Land), the eponymous CD block headquarters, is located at 24°50′30.7″N 87°45′21.5″E.

It is located 54 km from Sahibganj, the district headquarters.

Sahebganj district may be divided into three natural divisions – (i) the hilly portion stretching from the Ganges on the north to the borders of West Bengal on the south, (ii) the uplands, undulations, long ridges and depressions, with fertile lands, and (iii) the low fertile alluvial plains lying between the hills and the Ganges, with the Sahibganj loop line passing through the narrow strip. Three rivers flowing through this region – the Ganges, Gumani and Bansloi – make the plains rich and cultivable.

The Santhal Pargana division has about 5,120 square kilometres (1,980 sq mi) hilly tract, out of which about 3,471 square kilometres (1,340 sq mi) is in Damin-i-koh, which is spread across Sahibganj, Godda and Dumka districts, a major portion being in Sahibganj district. The Borio, Barhait, Taljhari and Pathana CD blocks of Sahibganj district are in the Damin-i-koh tract. Dense forests once covering the hills slopes have thinned out. Paddy is produced in the valleys. Barbatti and maize are grown in the hill area. Paharias, Mal Paharias and Santals generally inhabit the area.

Pathna CD block is bounded by Taljhari CD block on the north, Udhwa and Barharwa CD blocks on the east, Littipara and Hiranpur CD blocks in Pakur district on the south, and Barhait CD block on the west.

Pathna CD block has an area of 171.39 km^{2}.Ranga police station serves this block. Headquarters of this CD block is at Pathna village.

Pathna CD block has 124 inhabited (chiragi) and 26 uninhabited (bechiragi) villages.

== Demographics ==
=== Population ===
According to the 2011 Census of India, Pathna CD block had a total population of 81,940, all of which were rural. There were 41,136 (50%) males and 40,804 (50%) females. Population in the age range 0–6 years was 15,853. Scheduled Castes numbered 5,081 (6.20%) and Scheduled Tribes numbered 46,884 (57.22%).

=== Literacy ===
According to the 2011 census, the total number of literate persons in the Pathna CD block was 31,527 (47.71% of the population over 6 years) out of which 18,947 (60%) were males and 12,580 (40%) were females. The gender disparity (the difference between female and male literacy rates) was 20%.

See also – List of Jharkhand districts ranked by literacy rate

Literacy in CD Blocks of
Sahibganj district
Sahibganj subdivision
Sahibganj – 56.07%
Mandro – 46.03%
Borio – 42.38%
Barhait – 42.50%
Rajmahal subdivision
Taljhari – 47.74%
Rajmahal – 51.28%
Udhwa – 47.71%
Pathna – 47.71%
Barharwa – 58.54%
Source: 2011 Census: CD Block Wise
Primary Census Abstract Data

=== Language and religion ===
Religions in Pathna Block (2011)
Religion	Percent
Hinduism	53.89%
Christianity	19.91%
Islam	15.47%
Sarna	10.39%
Other or not stated	0.34%

Hindus are the majority religion, while Christians are the largest minority. Muslims and Sarna followers also have good numbers in the block.

Languages of Pathna block (2011)
1. Santali (51.7%)
2. Khortha (20.7%)
3. Bengali (11.4%)
4. Malto (9.01%)
5. Hindi (4.45%)
6. Bhojpuri (0.98%)
7. Others (1.69%)

At the time of the 2011 census, 51.70% of the population spoke Santali, 20.72% Khortha, 11.45% Bengali, 9.01% Malto, 4.45% Hindi and 0.98% Bhojpuri as their first language.

== Rural poverty ==
50-60% of the population of Sahibganj district were in the BPL category in 2004–2005, being in the same category as Pakur, Deoghar and Garhwa districts."Based on the number of the total rural households in Census 2011 and BPL Revision Survey of 2010-11 the percentage of BPL households in rural areas is 86.03 percent." Rural poverty in Jharkhand declined from 66% in 1993–94 to 46% in 2004–05. In 2011, it has come down to 39.1%.

== Economy ==
=== Livelihood ===
Livelihood
in Pathna CD block
1. Cultivators (28.5%)
2. Agricultural labourers (51.3%)
3. Household industries (3.79%)
4. Other Workers (16.4%)

In Pathna CD block in 2011, amongst the class of total workers, cultivators numbered 11,464 and formed 28.48%, agricultural labourers numbered 20,664 and formed 51.33%, household industry workers numbered 1,524 and formed 3.79% and other workers numbered 6,602 and formed 16.40%. Total workers numbered 40,254 and formed 49.13% of the total population. Non-workers numbered 41,686 and formed 50.87% of total population.

Note: In the census records a person is considered a cultivator, if the person is engaged in cultivation/ supervision of land owned. When a person who works on another person's land for wages in cash or kind or share, is regarded as an agricultural labourer. Household industry is defined as an industry conducted by one or more members of the family within the household or village, and one that does not qualify for registration as a factory under the Factories Act. Other workers are persons engaged in some economic activity other than cultivators, agricultural labourers and household workers. It includes factory, mining, plantation, transport and office workers, those engaged in business and commerce, teachers and entertainment artistes.

=== Infrastructure ===
There are 133 inhabited villages in Pathna CD block. In 2011, 22 villages had power supply. 13 villages had tap water (treated/ untreated), 130 villages had well water (covered/ uncovered), 90 villages had hand pumps, and all villages had drinking water facility. 15 village had post offices, 18 villages had sub post offices, 16 villages had telephones (land lines), 19 villages had public call offices and 41 villages had mobile phone coverage. 107 villages had pucca (paved) roads, 24 villages had bus service (private/public), 27 villages had auto/ modified auto, 28 villages had taxis/ vans, 44 villages had tractors, 2 villages had navigable waterways. 12 villages had bank branches, 7 villages had ATMs, 10 villages had agricultural credit societies, 6 villages had cinema/ video hall, 5 villages had public library and public reading room. 18 villages had public distribution system, 21 villages had weekly haat (market) and 36 villages had assembly polling stations.

=== Agriculture ===
A large part of Sahibganj district is hilly and most of the thick forests are gone. Some of the plains are cultivable. The livelihood scenario presented above indicates that a large population depends on agriculture. In Pathna CD block 42.75% of the total area is cultivable area and 28.80% of the cultivable area is irrigated area.

=== Backward Regions Grant Fund ===
Sahibganj district is listed as a backward region and receives financial support from the Backward Regions Grant Fund. The fund created by the Government of India is designed to redress regional imbalances in development. As of 2012, 272 districts across the country were listed under this scheme. The list includes 21 districts of Jharkhand.

== Education ==
Pathra CD block had 6 villages with pre-primary schools, 95 villages with primary schools, 37 villages with middle schools, 6 villages with secondary schools, 5 villages with senior secondary schools, 37 villages with no educational facility.
*Senior secondary schools are also known as Inter colleges in Jharkhand

== Healthcare ==
Pathra CD block had 5 villages with primary health centres, 12 villages with primary health subcentres, 7 villages with maternity and child welfare centres, 1 village with TB clinic, 3 villages with allopathic hospitals, 3 villages with dispensaries, 1 village with veterinary hospital, 3 villages with family welfare centres, 5 villages with medicine shops.
.*Private medical practitioners, alternative medicine etc. not included
