= Barharwa (community development block) =

- Community development block
- Location in Jharkhand, India
- Coordinates: 24°51′28″N 87°46′27″E
- Country: India
- State: Jharkhand
- District: Sahibganj

Government
  - Type: Federal democracy

Area
  - Total: 171.39 km^{2} (66.17 sq mi)
- Elevation: 38 m (125 ft)

Population (2011)
  - Total: 180,770
  - Density: 1,054.7/km^{2} (2,731.7/sq mi)

Languages
  - Official: Hindi, Urdu

Literacy (2011)
  - Total literates: 85,281 (58.54%)
- Time zone: UTC+5:30 (IST)
- PIN: 816109 (Sahibganj)
- Telephone/STD code: 06436
- Vehicle registration: JH 18
- Lok Sabha constituency: Rajmahal
- Vidhan Sabha constituency: Pakaur
- Website: sahibganj.nic.in

Barharwa is a community development block that forms an administrative division in the Rajmahal subdivision of the Sahibganj district, Jharkhand state, India.

== Geography ==
Barharwa, the eponymous CD block headquarters, is located at 25°51′28″N 87°46′27″E.

Sahebganj district may be divided into three natural divisions – (i) the hilly portion stretching from the Ganges on the north to the borders of West Bengal on the south, (ii) the uplands, undulations, long ridges and depressions, with fertile lands, and (iii) the low fertile alluvial plains lying between the hills and the Ganges, with the Sahibganj loop line passing through the narrow strip. Three rivers flowing through this region – the Ganges, Gumani and Bansloi – make the plains rich and cultivable.

Barharwa CD block is bounded by Udhwa CD block on the north, Farakka and Samserganj CD blocks in Murshidabad district of West Bengal on the east, Pakur and Hiranpur CD blocks in Pakur district on the south, and Pathna CD block on the west.

Barharwa CD block has an area of 171.39 km^{2}.Barharwa and Kotalpokhar police stations serve this block. Headquarters of this CD block is at Barharwa town.

Barharwa CD block has 155 inhabited (chiragi) and 86 uninhabited (bechiragi) villages.

== Demographics ==
=== Population ===
According to the 2011 Census of India, Barharwa CD block had a total population of 180,770, of which 168,153 were rural and 12,617 were urban. There were 92,228 (51%) males and 88,542 (49%) females. Population in the age range 0–6 years was 35,102. Scheduled Castes numbered 20,645 (11.42%) and Scheduled Tribes numbered 15,191 (8.40%).

Barharwa, a census town in Barharwa CD block had a population of 12,617 in 2011.

=== Literacy ===
According to the 2011 census, the total number of literate persons in Barharwa CD block was 85,281 (58.54% of the population over 6 years) out of which 48,679 (57%) were males and 36,602 (43%) were females. The gender disparity (the difference between female and male literacy rates) was 14%.

See also – List of Jharkhand districts ranked by literacy rate

Literacy in CD Blocks of
Sahibganj district
Sahibganj subdivision
Sahibganj – 56.07%
Mandro – 46.03%
Borio – 42.38%
Barhait – 42.50%
Rajmahal subdivision
Taljhari – 47.74%
Rajmahal – 51.28%
Udhwa – 47.71%
Pathna – 47.71%
Barharwa – 58.54%
Source: 2011 Census: CD Block Wise
Primary Census Abstract Data

=== Language and religion ===
Religions in Barharwa Block (2011)
Religion	Percent
Islam	52.35%
Hinduism	45.33%
Christianity	1.10%
Sarna	1.09%
Other or not stated	0.13%

Muslims (mainly Bengali Muslims) are the majority, while Hindus are in the minority. Christians and Sarna are a small percentage. In 2001, Muslims were 50.22% and Hindus 47.67% of the population respectively.

Languages of Barharwa block (2011)
1. Bengali (61.0%)
2. Khortha (14.8%)
3. Hindi (9.47%)
4. Santali (6.56%)
5. Bhojpuri (3.73%)
6. Kurukh (1.39%)
7. Urdu (1.33%)
8. Others (1.69%)

At the time of the 2011 census, 61.05% of the population spoke Bengali, 14.78% Khortha, 9.47% Hindi, 6.56% Santali, 3.73% Bhojpuri, 1.39% Kurukh and 1.33% Urdu as their first language.

== Rural poverty ==
50-60% of the population of Sahibganj district were in the BPL category in 2004–2005, being in the same category as Pakur, Deoghar and Garhwa districts."Based on the number of the total rural households in Census 2011 and BPL Revision Survey of 2010-11 the percentage of BPL households in rural areas is 86.03 percent." Rural poverty in Jharkhand declined from 66% in 1993–94 to 46% in 2004–05. In 2011, it has come down to 39.1%.

== Economy ==
=== Livelihood ===
Livelihood
in Barharwa CD block
1. Cultivators (9.26%)
2. Agricultural labourers (41.5%)
3. Household industries (3.70%)
4. Other Workers (45.5%)

In Barhrwa CD block in 2011, amongst the class of total workers, cultivators numbered 6,658 and formed 9.26%, agricultural labourers numbered 29,842 and formed 41.49%, household industry workers numbered 2,664 and formed 3.70% and other workers numbered 32,762 and formed 45.55%. Total workers numbered 76,356 and formed 42.24% of the total population. Non-workers numbered 104,414 and formed 57.76% of total population.

Note: In the census records a person is considered a cultivator, if the person is engaged in cultivation/ supervision of land owned. When a person who works on another person's land for wages in cash or kind or share, is regarded as an agricultural labourer. Household industry is defined as an industry conducted by one or more members of the family within the household or village, and one that does not qualify for registration as a factory under the Factories Act. Other workers are persons engaged in some economic activity other than cultivators, agricultural labourers and household workers. It includes factory, mining, plantation, transport and office workers, those engaged in business and commerce, teachers and entertainment artistes.

=== Infrastructure ===
There are 162 inhabited villages in Barharwa CD block. In 2011, 37 villages had power supply. 13 villages had tap water (treated/ untreated), 142 villages had well water (covered/ uncovered), 110 villages had hand pumps, and all villages had drinking water facility. 13 village had post offices, 10 villages had sub post offices, 6 villages had telephones (land lines), 12 villages had public call offices and 47 villages had mobile phone coverage. 115 villages had pucca (paved) roads, 5 villages had bus service (private/public), 6 villages had auto/ modified auto, 35 villages had taxis/ vans, 41 villages had tractors, 17 villages had navigable waterways. 11 villages had bank branches, 3 villages had ATMs, 1 village had agricultural credit society, 2 villages had cinema/ video hall. 30 villages had public distribution system, 6 villages had weekly haat (market) and 38 villages had assembly polling stations.

=== Agriculture ===
A large part of Sahibganj district is hilly and most of the thick forests are gone. Some of the plains are cultivable. The livelihood scenario presented above indicates that a large population depends on agriculture. In Barharwa CD block 74.55% of the total area is cultivable area and 14.43% of the cultivable area is irrigated area.

=== Backward Regions Grant Fund ===
Sahibganj district is listed as a backward region and receives financial support from the Backward Regions Grant Fund. The fund created by the Government of India is designed to redress regional imbalances in development. As of 2012, 272 districts across the country were listed under this scheme. The list includes 21 districts of Jharkhand.

== Transport ==
Barharwa Junction railway station on the Sahibganj Loop connects to the New Farakka railway station (95 km away) on the Howrah-New Jalpaiguri line and is a link for trains crossing the Farakka Barrage.

== Education ==
Barharwa CD block had 18 villages with pre-primary schools, 89 villages with primary schools, 43 villages with middle schools, 7 villages with secondary schools, 4 villages with senior secondary schools, 71 villages with no educational facility.
*Senior secondary schools are also known as Inter colleges in Jharkhand

== Healthcare ==
Barharwa CD block had 4 villages with primary health centres, 17 villages with primary health subcentres, 5 villages with dispensaries, 1 village with veterinary hospital, 1 village with family welfare centre, 7 villages with medicine shops.
.*Private medical practitioners, alternative medicine etc. not included

== See also ==
- Kankjol, a village in this block
