= Karanpurato railway station =

Railway station in Jharkhand, India

Karanpurato

General information
- Location: Karanpurato, Sahebganj district, Jharkhand; India
- Coordinates: 25°08′11″N 87°44′03″E
- Elevation: 39 m (128 ft)
- System: Passenger train station
- Owner: Indian Railways
- Operator: Eastern Railway zone
- Line: Rampurhat-Sahibganj Section
- Platforms: 2
- Tracks: 2

Construction
- Structure type: Standard (on ground station)

Other information
- Status: Active
- Station code: KPTO
- Zone(s): Eastern Railway zone
- Division(s): Malda

History
- Former names: East Indian Railway Company

Services
Preceding station	Indian Railways	Following station
Taljhari towards Khana	Eastern Railway zone Sahibganj loop	Maharajpur towards Kiul Junction
Location

Karanpurato railway station is a railway station on the Rampurhat-Sahibganj section under the Malda railway division of Eastern Railway zone. It is situated at Karanpurato in Sahebganj district in the Indian state of Jharkhand.
