= Taljhari railway station =

Railway station in Jharkhand, India

Taljhari

General information
- Location: National Highway 80, Taljhari, Sahebganj district, Jharkhand; India
- Coordinates: 25°04′56″N 87°44′30″E
- Elevation: 38 m (125 ft)
- System: Passenger train station
- Owner: Indian Railways
- Operator: Eastern Railway zone
- Line: Rampurhat-Sahibganj Section
- Platforms: 2
- Tracks: 2

Construction
- Structure type: Standard (on ground station)

Other information
- Status: Active
- Station code: TLJ
- Zone(s): Eastern Railway zone
- Division(s): Malda

History
- Former names: East Indian Railway Company

Services
| Preceding station | Indian Railways | Following station |
|---|---|---|
| Kalian Chak towards Khana | Eastern Railway zone Sahibganj loop | Karanpurato towards Kiul Junction |
Location

Taljhari railway station is a railway stationon the Rampurhat-Sahibganj section under the Malda railway division of Eastern Railway zone. It is situated beside National Highway 80 at Taljhari in Sahebganj district in the Indian state of Jharkhand.
