= Rajmahal (community development block) =

- Community development block
- Location in Jharkhand Rajmahal (India)
- Coordinates: 25°1′33″N 87°50′52″E
- Country: India
- State: Jharkhand
- District: Sahibganj

Government
  - Type: Federal democracy

Area
  - Total: 140.76 km^{2} (54.35 sq mi)
- Elevation: 30 m (98 ft)

Population (2011)
  - Total: 145,899
  - Density: 1,036.5/km^{2} (2,684.5/sq mi)

Languages
  - Official: Hindi, Urdu

Literacy (2011)
  - Total literates: 59,486 (51.28%)
- Time zone: UTC+5:30 (IST)
- PIN: 816108 (Rajmahal); 816116 (Tin Pahar)
- Telephone/STD code: 06426
- Vehicle registration: JH 18
- Lok Sabha constituency: Rajmahal
- Vidhan Sabha constituency: Rajmahal
- Website: sahibganj.nic.in

Rajmahal is a community development block that forms an administrative division in the Rajmahal subdivision of the Sahibganj district, Jharkhand state, India.

== Geography ==
Rajmahal, the eponymous CD Block headquarters, is located at 25°1′33″N 87°50′52″E.

It is located 32 km from Sahibganj, the district headquarters.

Sahebganj district may be divided into three natural divisions – (i) the hilly portion stretching from the Ganges on the north to the borders of West Bengal on the south, (ii) the uplands, undulations, long ridges and depressions, with fertile lands, and (iii) the low fertile alluvial plains lying between the hills and the Ganges, with the Sahibganj loop line passing through the narrow strip. Three rivers flowing through this region – the Ganges, Gumani and Bansloi - make the plains rich and cultivable.

Rajmahal CD block is bounded by Amdabad CD block in Katihar district of Bihar, across the Ganges, on the north, Manikchak and Kaliachak II CD blocks in Malda district of West Bengal, across the Ganges, and Farakka CD block in Murshidabad district of West Bengal on the east, Udwa CD block on the south and Taljhari and Sahibganj CD blocks on the west.

Rajmahal CD block has an area of 140.76 km^{2}.Rajmahal police station serves this block. Headquarters of this CD block is at Rajmahal town.

Rajmahal CD block has 98 inhabited (chiragi) and 49 uninhabited (bechiragi) villages.

== Demographics ==
=== Population ===
According to the 2011 Census of India, Rajmahal CD block had a total population of 145,899, of which 140,563 were rural and 5,336 were urban. There were 75,153 (52%) males and 70,746 (48%) females. Population in the age range 0–6 years was 29,897. Scheduled Castes numbered 6,234 (4.27%) and Scheduled Tribes numbered 8,799 (6.03%).

In the 2011 census, Tin Pahar was a census town in the Rajmahal CD block with a population of 5,336.

=== Literacy ===
According to the 2011 census, the total number of literate persons in the Rajmahal CD block was 59,486 (51.28% of the population over 6 years) out of which 35,641 (60%) were males and 23,845 (40%) were females. The gender disparity (the difference between female and male literacy rates) was 20%.

See also – List of Jharkhand districts ranked by literacy rate

Literacy in CD Blocks of
Sahibganj district
Sahibganj subdivision
Sahibganj – 56.07%
Mandro – 46.03%
Borio – 42.38%
Barhait – 42.50%
Rajmahal subdivision
Taljhari – 47.74%
Rajmahal – 51.28%
Udhwa – 47.71%
Pathna – 47.71%
Barharwa – 58.54%
Source: 2011 Census: CD Block Wise
Primary Census Abstract Data

=== Language and religion ===
Religions in Rajmahal Block (2011)
Religion	Percent
Hinduism	51.23%
Islam	45.57%
Sarna	2.10%
Christianity	1.02%
Other or not stated	0.08%

Hindus form around half the population. Muslims (mainly Bengali Muslims) are a significant minority, while Christians and Sarna have small populations.

Languages of Rajmahal block (2011)
1. Bengali (38.9%)
2. Hindi (32.4%)
3. Khortha (12.2%)
4. Santali (5.61%)
5. Urdu (4.63%)
6. Bhojpuri (2.96%)
7. Kurukh (1.70%)
8. Others (1.61%)

At the time of the 2011 census, 38.88% of the population spoke Bengali, 32.40% Hindi, 12.21% Khortha, 5.61% Santali, 4.63% Urdu, 2.96% Bhojpuri and 1.70% Kurukh as their first language.

== Rural poverty ==
50-60% of the population of Sahibganj district were in the BPL category in 2004–2005, being in the same category as Pakur, Deoghar and Garhwa districts. "Based on the number of the total rural households in Census 2011 and BPL Revision Survey of 2010-11 the percentage of BPL households in rural areas is 86.03 percent." Rural poverty in Jharkhand declined from 66% in 1993–94 to 46% in 2004–05. In 2011, it has come down to 39.1%.

== Economy ==
=== Livelihood ===
Livelihood
in Rajmahal CD block
1. Cultivators (15.7%)
2. Agricultural labourers (48.6%)
3. Household industries (20.0%)
4. Other Workers (15.7%)

In Rajmahal CD block in 2011, amongst the class of total workers, cultivators numbered 9,921 and formed 15.69%, agricultural labourers numbered 30,763 and formed 48.65%, household industry workers numbered 12,654 and formed 20.01% and other workers numbered 9,893 and formed 15.65%. Total workers numbered 72,082 and formed 42.80% of the total population. Non-workers numbered 96,331 and formed 57.20% of total population.

Note: In the census records a person is considered a cultivator, if the person is engaged in cultivation/ supervision of land owned. When a person who works on another person's land for wages in cash or kind or share, is regarded as an agricultural labourer. Household industry is defined as an industry conducted by one or more members of the family within the household or village, and one that does not qualify for registration as a factory under the Factories Act. Other workers are persons engaged in some economic activity other than cultivators, agricultural labourers and household workers. It includes factory, mining, plantation, transport and office workers, those engaged in business and commerce, teachers and entertainment artistes.

=== Infrastructure ===
There are 101 inhabited villages in Rajmahal CD block. In 2011, 53 villages had power supply. 12 villages had tap water (treated/ untreated), 96 villages had well water (covered/ uncovered), 63 villages had hand pumps, and all villages had drinking water facility. 5 village had post offices, 8 villages had sub post offices, 9 villages had telephones (land lines), 11 villages had public call offices and 40 villages had mobile phone coverage. 73 villages had pucca (paved) roads, 17 villages had bus service (private/public), 9 villages had auto/ modified auto, 19 villages had taxis/ vans, 40 villages had tractors, 14 villages had navigable waterways. 7 villages had bank branches, 3 villages had cinema/ video hall, 1 village had public library and public reading room. 24 villages had public distribution system, 12 villages had weekly haat (market) and 24 villages had assembly polling stations.

=== Agriculture ===
A large part of Sahibganj district is hilly and most of the thick forests are gone. Some of the plains are cultivable. The livelihood scenario presented above indicates that a large population depends on agriculture. In Rajmahal CD block 80.84% of the total area is cultivable area and 12.83% of the cultivable area is irrigated area.

=== Backward Regions Grant Fund ===
Sahibganj district is listed as a backward region and receives financial support from the Backward Regions Grant Fund. The fund created by the Government of India is designed to redress regional imbalances in development. As of 2012, 272 districts across the country were listed under this scheme. The list includes 21 districts of Jharkhand.

== Transport ==
The Khana Junction-Rajmahal section of the Sahibganj Loop was complete in October 1859 and the first train ran from Howrah to Rajmahal via Khana on 4 July 1860.

== Education ==
Rajmahal CD block had 5 villages with pre-primary schools, 57 villages with primary schools, 24 villages with middle schools, 5 villages with secondary schools, 43 villages with no educational facility.

== Healthcare ==
Rajmahal CD block had 2 villages with primary health centres, 7 villages with primary health subcentres, 3 villages with allopathic hospitals, 1 village with dispensary, 8 villages with medicine shops.
.*Private medical practitioners, alternative medicine etc. not included
