= Rajmahal subdivision =

- Subdivision
- Location in Jharkhand, India Rajmahal subdivision (India)
- Coordinates: 25.05°N 87.84°E
- Country: India
- State: Jharkhand
- District: Sahibganj
- Headquarters: Rajmahal

Area
  - Total: 1,117.39 km^{2} (431.43 sq mi)

Population
  - Total: 465,851
  - Density: 416.910/km^{2} (1,079.79/sq mi)

Languages
  - Official: Hindi, Urdu
- Time zone: UTC+5:30 (IST)
- Website: sahibganj.nic.in

Rajmahal subdivision is an administrative subdivision of the Sahibganj district in the Santhal Pargana division in the state of Jharkhand, India.

== History ==
As a result of the Santhal rebellion, Act XXXVII of 1855 was passed by the British Raj, and a separate district called Santhal Pargana was carved out of parts of Birbhum and Bhagalpur districts. Santhal Pargana had four sub-districts – Dumka, Godda, Deoghar and Rajmahal. Subsequently, Santal Pargana district comprised Dumka, Deoghar, Sahibganj, Godda, Pakur and Jamtara sub-divisions. In 1983 Deoghar, Sahibganj and Godda subdivisions were given district status.

== Administrative set up ==
Sahibganj district has two subdivisions: Sahibganj and Rajmahal. Taljhari, Rajmahal, Udhwa, Pathna and Barharwa community development blocks and Rajmahal town are in Rajmahal subdivision.

Sahibganj district has two subdivisions:

Subdivision	Headquarters	Area km^{2}	Population (2011)	Rural population % (2011)	Urban population % (2011)
Sahibganj	Sahebganj	1,117.39	465,851	76.46	23.54
Rajmahal	Rajmahal	994.84	684,716	92.70	7.30

Cities, towns and locations in the Sahibganj, Godda and Pakur districts in Santhal Pargana Division
M: municipality, CT: census town, R: rural/ urban centre, H: historical/ religious/ tourist centre
Owing to space constraints in the small map, the actual locations in a larger map may vary slightly

== Demographics ==
According to the 2011 Census of India data, Rajmahal subdivision, in Sahibganj district, had a total population of 684,716. There were 349,918 (51%) males and 334,798 (49%) females. Scheduled castes numbered 44,774 (6.64%) and scheduled tribes numbered 123,144 (17.98%). Literacy rate was 41.37%.

See also – List of Jharkhand districts ranked by literacy rate

== Police stations ==
Police stations in Rajmahal subdivision are at:

1. Rajmahal
2. Barharwa
3. Kotalpokhar
4. Radhanagar
5. Ranga
6. Taljhari

== Blocks ==
Community development blocks in Rajmahal subdivision are:

CD Block	Headquarters	Area km^{2}	Population (2011)	SC %	ST %	Literacy rate %	NP, CT
Taljhari	Taljhari	273.03	76,330	6.64	55.48	47.74	-
Rajmahal	Rajmahal	140.76	145,899	4.27	6.03	51.28	Tin Pahar
Udhwa	Udhwa	214.83	177,263	3.54	5.50	47.71	Patra
Pathna	Pathna	171.39	81,940	6.20	57.22	47.71	-
Barharwa	Barharwa	171.39	12,617	11.42	8.40	58.54	Barharwa

== Education ==
In 2011, in the CD blocks of Rajmahal subdivision out of a total 677 inhabited villages there were 72 villages with pre-primary schools, 392 villages with primary schools, 161 villages with middle schools, 24 villages with secondary schools, 11 villages with senior secondary schools, 3 villages with non-formal education centres, 2 villages with vocational training schools/ ITI, 277 villages with no educational facility.
.*Senior secondary schools are also known as Inter colleges in Jharkhand

=== Educational facilities ===
(Information about degree colleges with proper reference may be added here)

== Healthcare ==
In 2011, in the CD blocks of Rajmahal subdivision there were 24 villages with primary health centres, 51 villages with primary health subcentres, 10 villages with maternity and child welfare centres, 3 villages with allopathic hospitals, 10 villages with dispensaries, 8 villages with veterinary hospitals, 4 villages with family welfare centres, 36 villages with medicine shops.
.*Private medical practitioners, alternative medicine etc. not included

=== Medical facilities ===
(Anybody having referenced information about location of government/ private medical facilities may please add it here)
