= Maharajpur railway station =

Railway station in Jharkhand

Maharajpur

General information
- Location: National Highway 80, Kaliyani, Maharajpur, Sahebganj district, Jharkhand; India
- Coordinates: 25°13′11″N 87°44′25″E
- Elevation: 34 m (112 ft)
- System: Passenger train station
- Owner: Indian Railways
- Operator: Eastern Railway zone
- Line: Rampurhat-Sahibganj Section
- Platforms: 3
- Tracks: 2

Construction
- Structure type: Standard (on ground station)

Other information
- Status: Active
- Station code: MJP
- Zone(s): Eastern Railway zone
- Division(s): Malda

History
- Former names: East Indian Railway Company

Services
Preceding station	Indian Railways	Following station
Karanpurato towards Khana	Eastern Railway zone Sahibganj loop	Sakrigali towards Kiul Junction
Location

Maharajpur railway station is a railway station on the Rampurhat-Sahibganj section under the Malda railway division of Eastern Railway zone. It is situated beside National Highway 80 at Kaliyani, Maharajpur in Sahebganj district in the Indian state of Jharkhand.
