= Ranga, Sahibganj =

Ranga
- Village
- Location in Jharkhand, India Ranga (India)
- Coordinates: 24.856231°N 87.687972°E
- Country: India
- State: Jharkhand
- District: Sahibganj

Population (2011)
  - Total: 663

Languages (*For language details see Pathna#Language and religion)
  - Official: Hindi, Urdu
- Time zone: UTC+5:30 (IST)
- PIN: 816101
- Telephone/ STD code: 06426
- Lok Sabha constituency: Rajmahal
- Vidhan Sabha constituency: Rajmahal
- Website: sahibganj.nic.in

Ranga is a village in the Pathna CD block in the Rajmahal subdivision of the Sahibganj district in the Indian state of Jharkhand.

== Geography ==
Cities, towns and locations in the Sahibganj, Godda and Pakur districts in Santhal Pargana Division
M: municipality, CT: census town, R: rural/ urban centre, H: historical/ religious/ tourist centre
Owing to space constraints in the small map, the actual locations in a larger map may vary slightly

=== Location ===
Ranga is located at 24.856231°N 87.687972°E.

Ranga has an area of 104 hectares (260 acres).

=== Overview ===
The map shows a hilly area with the Rajmahal hills running from the bank of the Ganges in the extreme north to the south, beyond the area covered by the map into Dumka district. ‘Farakka’ is marked on the map and that is where Farakka Barrage is, just inside West Bengal. Rajmahal coalfield is shown in the map. The entire area is overwhelmingly rural with only small pockets of urbanisation.

== Demographics ==
According to the 2011 Census of India, Ranga a total population of 663, of which 327 (49%) were males and 336 (51%) were females. Population in the age range 0–6 years was 144. The total number of literate persons in Ranga was 342 (65.90% of the population over 6 years).

== Civic administration ==
=== Police station ===
Ranga police station serves the Pathna CD block.
