= KXE =

KXE may refer to:

- KXE, the IATA code for Klerksdorp Airport, South Africa
- KXE, the Indian Railways station code for Kalian Chak railway station, Jharkhand, India
