= Udhwa (community development block) =

- Community development block
- Location in Jharkhand
- Coordinates: 24°58′13″N 87°50′43″E
- Country: India
- State: Jharkhand
- District: Sahibganj

Government
  - Type: Federal democracy

Area
  - Total: 214.83 km^{2} (82.95 sq mi)

Population (2011)
  - Total: 177,263
  - Density: 825.13/km^{2} (2,137.1/sq mi)

Languages
  - Official: Hindi, Urdu

Literacy (2011)
  - Total literates: 65,797 (47.71%)
- Time zone: UTC+5:30 (IST)
- PIN: 816108 (Rajmahal)
- Telephone/STD code: 06426
- Vehicle registration: JH 18
- Lok Sabha constituency: Rajmahal
- Vidhan Sabha constituency: Rajmahal
- Website: sahibganj.nic.in

Udhwa is a community development block that forms an administrative division in the Rajmahal subdivision of the Sahibganj district, Jharkhand state, India.

== Geography ==
Udhwa, the eponymous CD block headquarters, is located at 24°58′13″N 87°50′43″E.

It is located 42 km from Sahibganj, the district headquarters.

Sahebganj district may be divided into three natural divisions – (i) the hilly portion stretching from the Ganges on the north to the borders of West Bengal on the south, (ii) the uplands, undulations, long ridges and depressions, with fertile lands, and (iii) the low fertile alluvial plains lying between the hills and the Ganges, with the Sahibganj loop line passing through the narrow strip. Three rivers flowing through this region – the Ganges, Gumani and Bansloi- make the plains rich and cultivable.

Udhwa CD block is bounded by Rajmahal CD block on the north, Farakka CD block in Murshidabad district of West Bengal on the east, Barharwa CD block on the south and Pathna and Taljhari CD blocks on the west.

Udhwa CD block has an area of 214.83 km^{2}.Radhanagar police station serves this block. Headquarters of this CD block is at Udhwa village.

Udhwa CD block has 79 inhabited (chiragi) and 50 uninhabited (bechiragi) villages.

== Demographics ==
=== Population ===
According to the 2011 Census of India, Udhwa CD block had a total population of 177,263, of which 167,727 were rural and 9,536 were urban. There were 90,967 (51%) males and 86,296 (49%) females. Population in the age range 0–6 years was 35,505. Scheduled Castes numbered 6,269 (3.54%) and Scheduled Tribes numbered 9,741 (5.50%).

In the 2011 census, Patra was a census town in Udhwa CD block with a population of 9,536.

Udhwa CD block had several villages with a high population (2011 census population figures in brackets): Begamganj (11,316), Radhanagar (6,330), Udhua Diara (11,531), Palasgachhi Diara (18,328), Piarpur Diara (13,340), Amanat Diara (7,487), Pranpur (8,300) and Srighar (5,712).

=== Literacy ===
According to the 2011 census, the total number of literate persons in the Udhwa CD block was 65,797 (47.71% of the population over 6 years) out of which 38,343 (58%) were males and 27,454 (42%) were females. The gender disparity (the difference between female and male literacy rates) was 16%.

See also – List of Jharkhand districts ranked by literacy rate

Literacy in CD Blocks of
Sahibganj district
Sahibganj subdivision
Sahibganj – 56.07%
Mandro – 46.03%
Borio – 42.38%
Barhait – 42.50%
Rajmahal subdivision
Taljhari – 47.74%
Rajmahal – 51.28%
Udhwa – 47.71%
Pathna – 47.71%
Barharwa – 58.54%
Source: 2011 Census: CD Block Wise
Primary Census Abstract Data

=== Language and religion ===
Religions in Udhwa Block (2011)
Religion	Percent
Islam	63.73%
Hinduism	34.62%
Christianity	1.46%
Other or not stated	0.19%

Muslims (mainly Bengali Muslims) are the majority, while Hindus are in the minority. Christians are a small percentage.

Languages of Udhwa block (2011)
1. Bengali (70.1%)
2. Hindi (16.8%)
3. Santali (5.21%)
4. Urdu (3.81%)
5. Khortha (3.38%)
6. Others (0.74%)

At the time of the 2011 census, 70.11% of the population spoke Bengali, 16.75% Hindi, 5.21% Santali, 3.81% Urdu and 3.38% Khortha as their first language.

== Rural poverty ==
50-60% of the population of Sahibganj district were in the BPL category in 2004–2005, being in the same category as Pakur, Deoghar and Garhwa districts."Based on the number of the total rural households in Census 2011 and BPL Revision Survey of 2010-11 the percentage of BPL households in rural areas is 86.03 percent." Rural poverty in Jharkhand declined from 66% in 1993–94 to 46% in 2004–05. In 2011, it has come down to 39.1%.

== Economy ==
=== Livelihood ===
Livelihood
in Udhwa CD block
1. Cultivators (19.4%)
2. Agricultural labourers (45.2%)
3. Household industries (24.1%)
4. Other Workers (11.3%)

In Udhwa CD block in 2011, amongst the class of total workers, cultivators numbered 12,299 and formed 19.38%, agricultural labourers numbered 28,716 and formed 45.24%, household industry workers numbered 15,282 and formed 24.08% and other workers numbered 7,178 and formed 11.31%. Total workers numbered 67,055 and formed 37.83% of the total population. Non-workers numbered 110,208 and formed 62.17% of total population.

Note: In the census records a person is considered a cultivator, if the person is engaged in cultivation/ supervision of land owned. When a person who works on another person's land for wages in cash or kind or share, is regarded as an agricultural labourer. Household industry is defined as an industry conducted by one or more members of the family within the household or village, and one that does not qualify for registration as a factory under the Factories Act. Other workers are persons engaged in some economic activity other than cultivators, agricultural labourers and household workers. It includes factory, mining, plantation, transport and office workers, those engaged in business and commerce, teachers and entertainment artistes.

=== Infrastructure ===
There are 76 inhabited villages in Udhwa CD block. In 2011, 13 villages had power supply. 4 villages had tap water (treated/ untreated), 69 villages had well water (covered/ uncovered), 45 villages had hand pumps, and all villages had drinking water facility. 12 village had post offices, 7 villages had sub post offices, 6 villages had telephones (land lines), 12 villages had public call offices and 30 villages had mobile phone coverage. 50 villages had pucca (paved) roads, 11 villages had bus service (private/public), 10 villages had auto/ modified auto, 16 villages had taxis/ vans, 21 villages had tractors, 18 villages had navigable waterways. 6 villages had bank branches, 1 village had an ATM, 3 villages had agricultural credit societies, 4 villages had cinema/ video hall. 7 villages had public distribution system, 16 villages had weekly haat (market) and 15 villages had assembly polling stations.

=== Agriculture ===
A large part of Sahibganj district is hilly and most of the thick forests are gone. Some of the plains are cultivable. The livelihood scenario presented above indicates that a large population depends on agriculture. In Udhwa CD block 62.66% of the total area is cultivable area and 43.16% of the cultivable area is irrigated area.

=== Backward Regions Grant Fund ===
Sahibganj district is listed as a backward region and receives financial support from the Backward Regions Grant Fund. The fund created by the Government of India is designed to redress regional imbalances in development. As of 2012, 272 districts across the country were listed under this scheme. The list includes 21 districts of Jharkhand.

== Education ==
Udhwa CD block had 14 villages with pre-primary schools, 35 villages with primary schools, 19 villages with middle schools, 3 villages with secondary schools, 1 village with senior secondary school, 37 villages with no educational facility.
*Senior secondary schools are also known as Inter colleges in Jharkhand

== Healthcare ==
Udhwa CD block had 4 villages with primary health centres, 13 villages with primary health subcentres, 2 villages with maternity and child welfare centres, 3 villages with allopathic hospitals, 10 villages with medicine shops.
.*Private medical practitioners, alternative medicine etc. not included
