= Pathna, Sahibganj =

Pathna
- Village
- Location in Jharkhand, India Pathna (India)
- Coordinates: 24.841861°N 87.755972°E
- Country: India
- State: Jharkhand
- District: Sahibganj

Languages (*For language details see Pathna#Language and religion)
  - Official: Hindi, Urdu
- Time zone: UTC+5:30 (IST)
- PIN: 816110
- Telephone/ STD code: 06435
- Lok Sabha constituency: Rajmahal
- Vidhan Sabha constituency: Rajmahal
- Website: sahibganj.nic.in

Pathna is a location in the Pathna CD block in the Rajmahal subdivision of the Sahibganj district in the Indian state of Jharkhand.

== Geography ==
Cities, towns and locations in the Sahibganj, Godda and Pakur districts in Santhal Pargana Division
M: municipality, CT: census town, R: rural/ urban centre, H: historical/ religious/ tourist centre
Owing to space constraints in the small map, the actual locations in a larger map may vary slightly

=== Location ===
Pathna is located at 24.841861°N 87.755972°E.

Pathna is not identified in 2011 census as a separate place. In the map of Pathna CD block on page 129 of the District Census Handbook 2011, Sahibganj, Pathna is marked as headquarters of the CD block but the maps in the Jharkhand census handbooks are so unclear that the mouza/ village it is located in cannot be identified. (Anybody can check the map as given in the reference and if the mouza/ village can be identified, it can be recorded here.)

=== Overview ===
The map shows a hilly area with the Rajmahal hills running from the bank of the Ganges in the extreme north to the south, beyond the area covered by the map into Dumka district. ‘Farakka’ is marked on the map and that is where Farakka Barrage is, just inside West Bengal. Rajmahal coalfield is shown in the map. The entire area is overwhelmingly rural with only small pockets of urbanisation.

== Civic administration ==
=== CD block HQ ===
Headquarters of this CD block is at Pathna location.

== Education ==
Model School Pathna is an English-medium coeducational institution established in 2012. It has facilities for teaching from class VI to class XII.

Bohra Sita Annapurna Inter Mahila College Pathna is a girls only institution established in 1981. It has facilities for teaching in classes XI and XII.

Project Girls High School Pathna is a Hindi-medium girls only (NOT coeducational as the name clearly suggests) institution established in 2000. It has facilities for teaching from class VIII to class X.
