= I'tisam-ud-Din =

Bengali diplomat and traveller (1730–1800)

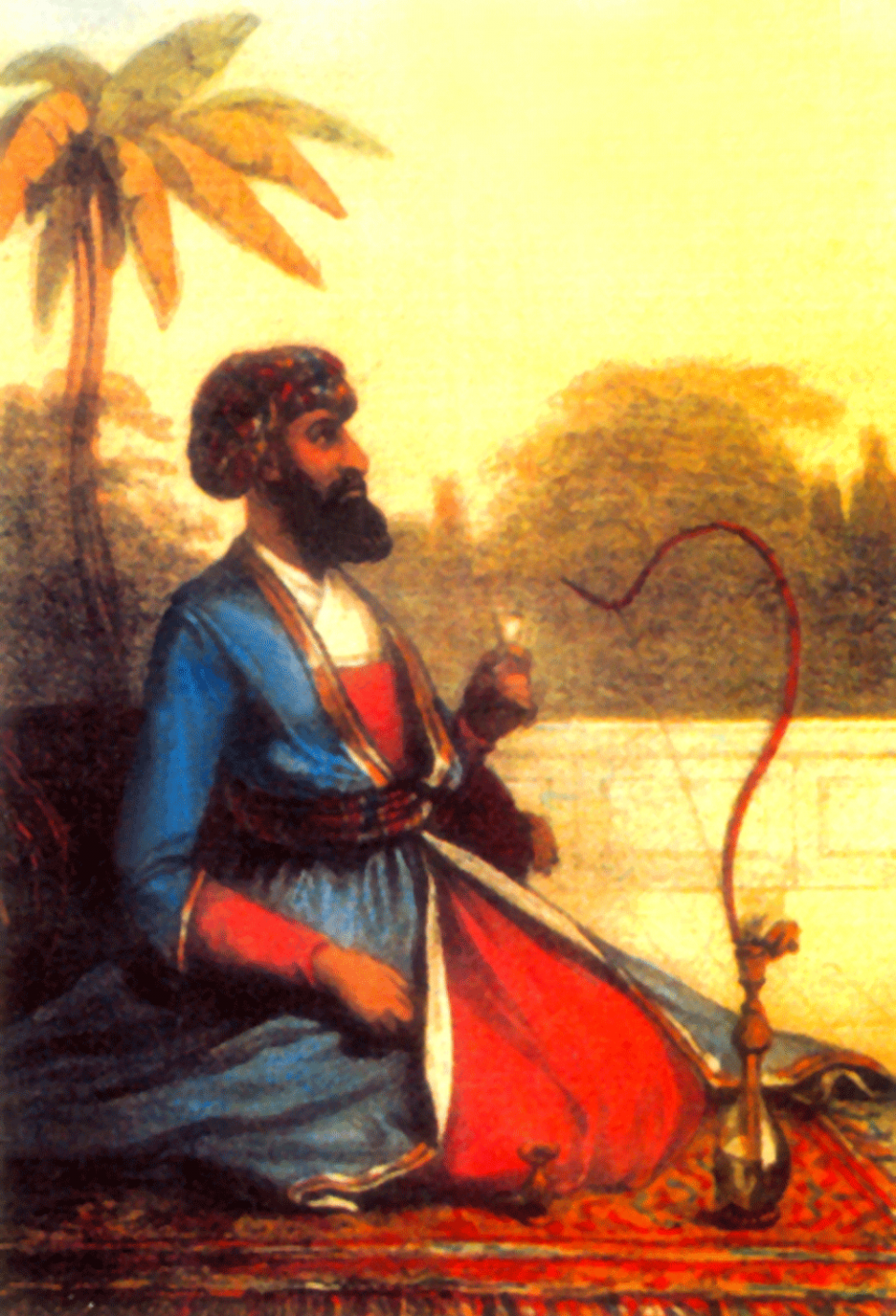
- A portrait of the Mirza smoking hukka
- Born: Syed Muḥammad Iʻtiṣām ud-Dīn; 1730; Panchnur, Nadia, Bengal Subah, Mughal Empire
- Died: 1800 (aged 69–70)

Shaikh Mirza Syed Muhammad Iʻtisam ud-Din Panchnuri (Note: Bengali: সৈয়দ মোহাম্মদ ইতেশামুদ্দিন) (1730–1800) was a Bengali diplomat for the Mughal Empire. He became the first South Asian to travel to Europe in the early modern period, in 1765. He was also a munshi serving the Nawabs of Bengal as well as the British East India Company. He had also written the text of the 1765 Treaty of Allahabad.

== Early life and ancestry ==
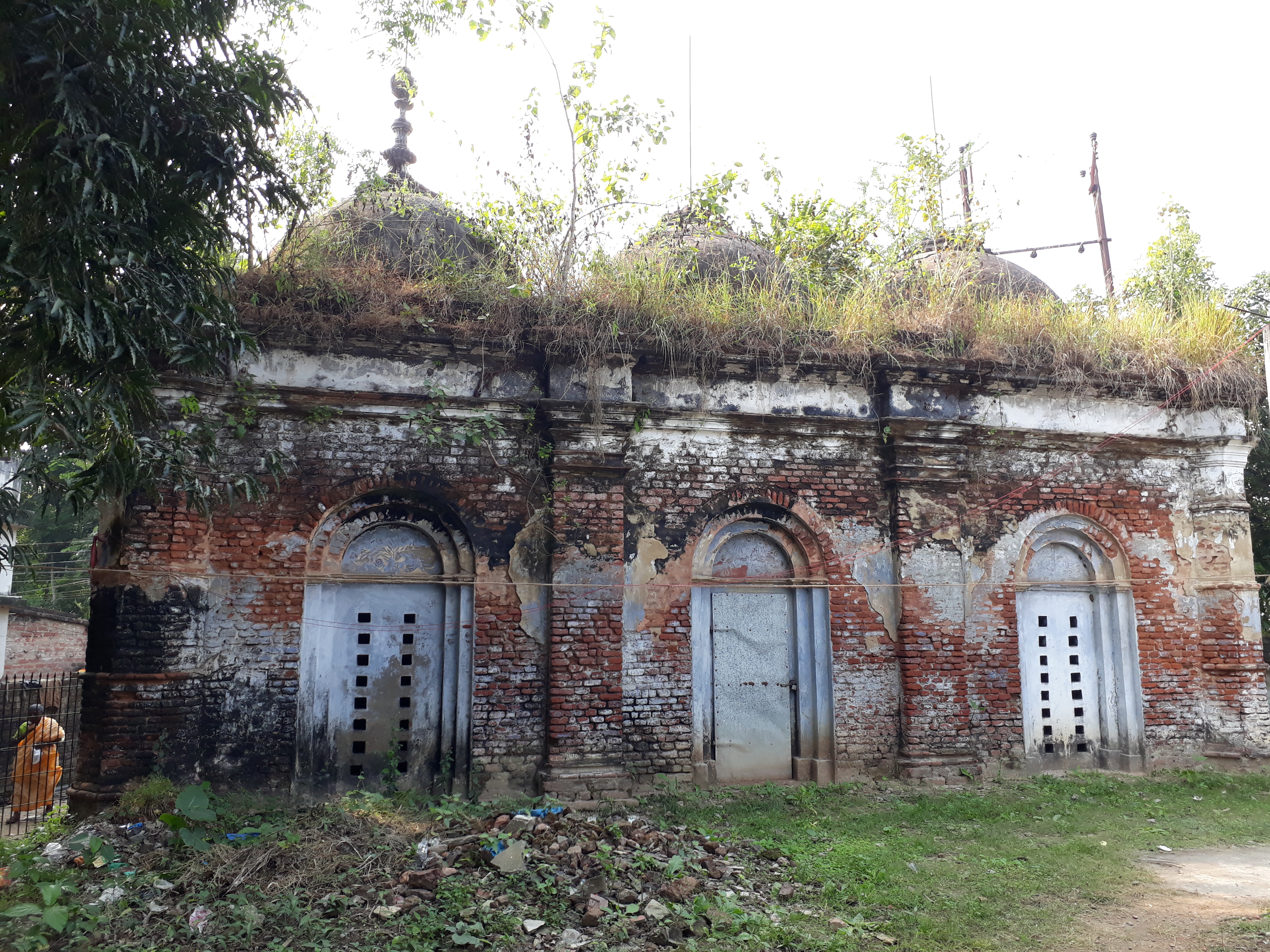
The ancient Kazipara mosque in I'tisam-ud-Din's birthplace at Chakdah

Syed Muhammad I'tisam-ud-Din was born in 1730, to Sheikh Syed Taj-ud-Din, at the local Kazipara Masjid near his village. He belonged to a Bengali Muslim family of Syeds from the village of Panchnur, they had been a respected family who had been Sheikhs, near the town of Chakdaha within Nadia district in the Mughal Empire's Bengal Subah The contemporary Bengali historian Shabnam Begum equates her grandfather, Sheikh Syed Shahab-ud-Din, to Shihabuddin Talish, author of the Fathiya-i 'Ibriya, an account of Mir Jumla's invasion of Assam.

His birthplace, Kazipara Masjid, still stands today and his forefathers moved to Panchnur following the Battle of Pandua in Pandua. His ancestors settled in Bengal after fleeing the Mongol invasion of Persia and Mesopotamia.

== Education ==
I'tisam-ud-Din came from a privileged background, in which he was well educated and fluent in the Bengali, Arabic, Hindustani and Persian languages. His elder brother was a mufti and adviser to the Nawab of Bengal, Alivardi Khan. Munshi Salimullah and Mirza Muhammad Qasim, who worked under Mir Jafar, trained I'tisam to also become a munshi and taught him Persian.

== Career ==
He began his career as a munshi to Mir Jafar in Murshidabad. On the accession of Mir Qasim (r. 1760–1763), he entered the service of the British East India Company's Major Martin Yorke and Major Mark and took part in a campaign against Raja Asad uz-Zaman Khan of Birbhum. After the battle, Emperor Shah Alam II recognised his efforts during a visit to Azimabad.

Later, I'tisam served under Captain Mackinon as paymaster for an orphanage. He fought alongside Mackinon and the Company against Mir Qasim in 1763 during the Battle of Giria and the Battle of Udhwa Nala. Bardette also made I'tisam the Tehsildar of Kutubpur.

=== Travel to Europe ===
In 1765, he entered the service of John Carnac and had another audience with the Emperor Shah Alam at Jahazgarh. He assisted Colonel Carnac in a battle from Faizabad to Shora-Shapur. Following the battle, Shah Alam II offered I'tisam the title of Mirza if he was willing to work under him as a Munshi as well as the opportunity to travel to Europe. In Murshidabad, he set off with Captain Archibald Swinton on a diplomatic mission to the court of King George III to send a letter from Shah Alam II and one lakh taka. I'tisam was also accompanied by his servant, Muhammad Muqim. After three weeks at sea, Swinton revealed to I'tisam that neither the letter from Shah Alam nor his tribute of a lakh of takas was on board as it had been seized by Robert Clive. I'tisam taught Swinton the Arabic tales of Kalila and Demna. Clive later on sent the money to the English king, on his own behalf to suppress contact between England and the Mughals. As such I'tisam never ended up meeting George III and instead accompanied Swinton to Nantes in France via the southern coast of Africa. He also visited Mauritius, Madagascar, the Cape of Good Hope and Ascension Island. In Nantes, Swinton left for England while I'tisam remained in France for a month travelling to Calais as well.

From Calais, I'tisam took a ship to Dover, reaching Britain in 1766. He remained in London for three months before reuniting with Swinton in Oxford, where they assisted Sir William Jones with South Asian manuscripts, the translation of the Persian book Farhang-i-Jahangiri into English and Jones' book, A grammar of the Persian language. During his time, he also taught Persian to those who intended to work with in the Mughal Empire.

=== Return to Asia ===
He returned to Bengal after a three-year absence due to food problems. He was later employed by the British East India Company in negotiations with the Maratha Empire. He travelled with John Hamilton to Pune and drew up treaties and settled peace. Locals gave I'tisam-ud-Din the nickname of Bilayet Munshi due to him being the first to travel to what was known as the Vilayet.

In 1785, he published the Shigurf-nama-i-Wilayat (or 'Wonder Book of England'), in the Persian language, detailing his travels. He was the first South Asian to visit England and describe the journey. The work has been translated into Bengali, English and Hindustani.

== Written works ==
- Treaty of Allahabad
- Shigurf Namah i Vilayat (Excellent intelligence concerning Europe)
  - "The wonders of Vilayet : being the memoir, originally in Persian, of a visit to France and Britain by Mirza Sheikh Iʼtesamuddin, an eighteenth century Indian gentleman"
  - "Shigurf namah i velaët, or, Excellent intelligence concerning Europe : being the travels of Mirza Itesa Modeen, in Great Britain and France"
- Nasab Namah (Family tree of Itisam Uddin)

== Death ==
It is estimated that he died in 1800.
