= Taljhari, Sahibganj =

Taljhari
- Village
- Location in Jharkhand, India Taljhari (India)
- Coordinates: 25.103744°N 87.733189°E
- Country: India
- State: Jharkhand
- District: Sahibganj

Population (2011)
  - Total: 1,377

Languages (*For language details see Taljhari#Language and religion)
  - Official: Hindi, Urdu
- Time zone: UTC+5:30 (IST)
- PIN: 816129
- Telephone/ STD code: 06426
- Lok Sabha constituency: Rajmahal
- Vidhan Sabha constituency: Borio
- Website: sahibganj.nic.in

Taljhari is a village in the Taljhari CD block in the Rajmahal subdivision of the Sahibganj district in the Indian state of Jharkhand.

== Geography ==
Cities, towns and locations in the Sahibganj, Godda and Pakur districts in Santhal Pargana Division
M: municipality, CT: census town, R: rural/ urban centre, H: historical/ religious/ tourist centre
Owing to space constraints in the small map, the actual locations in a larger map may vary slightly

=== Location ===
Taljhari is located at 25.103744°N 87.733189°E.

Taljhari has an area of 149 hectares (370 acres).

== Demographics ==
According to the 2011 Census of India, Taljhari had a total population of 1,377, of which 691 (50%) were males and 688 (50%) were females. Population in the age range 0–6 years was 229. The total number of literate persons in Taljhari was 701 (61.06% of the population over 6 years).

== Civic administration ==
=== Police station ===
Taljhari police station serves the Taljhari CD block.

=== CD block HQ ===
Headquarters of Taljhari CD block is at Taljhari village.

== Education ==
Model School Taljhari is an English-medium coeducational institution established in 2011. It has facilities for teaching from class VI to class XII.

Project Girls High School is a ?-medium girls only institution established in 1985. It has facilities for teaching from class VII to class X.

Government Girls High School is a Hindi-medium girls only institution established in 1965. It has facilities for teaching from class I to class X.

Kasturba Gandhi Balika Vidyalaya Taljhari is a Hindi-medium girls only institution established in 2005. It has facilities for teaching from class VI to class XII.
