= Bishanpur, Sahibganj =

Bishanpur Bisanpur
- Village
- Interactive map of Bishanpur
- Coordinates: 24.244°N 87.400°E
- Country: India
- State: Jharkhand
- District: Sahibganj
- Block: Barharwa
- Elevation: 38 m (125 ft)
- Time zone: UTC+05:30 (IST)
- Pincode: 816101
- Telephone Code / Std Code: 06426

Bishanpur is a village located in Pathna taluk, Sahibganj district, Jharkhand, India. This place is in the border of the Sahebganj District and Murshidabad District. It is near to the West Bengal state border. Bishanpur is surrounded by Pathna Block towards the west, Udhwa Block towards the north, Farakka Block towards the east, and Barhait Block towards the west.

== Notable landmarks ==
- Bindabasini Temple
