= Kalian Chak railway station =

Railway station in Jharkhand

Kalian Chak

General information
- Location: Kalian Chak, Sahebganj district, Jharkhand; India
- Coordinates: 25°02′04″N 87°44′12″E
- Elevation: 45 m (148 ft)
- System: Passenger train station
- Owner: Indian Railways
- Operator: Eastern Railway zone
- Line: Sahibganj loop line
- Platforms: 3
- Tracks: 2

Construction
- Structure type: Standard (on ground station)

Other information
- Status: Active
- Station code: KXE
- Zone(s): Eastern Railway zone
- Division(s): Malda

History
- Former names: East Indian Railway Company

Services
| Preceding station | Indian Railways | Following station |
|---|---|---|
| Tinpahar Junction towards Khana | Eastern Railway zone Sahibganj loop | Taljhari towards Kiul Junction |
Location

Kalian Chak railway station is a railway station on Sahibganj loop line under the Malda railway division of Eastern Railway zone. It is situated at Kalian Chak in Sahebganj district in the Indian state of Jharkhand.
