= Kodarjana =

Village in India

Coordinates: 25.2673°N 87.5483°E

Koderjana is a village in Sahibganj district of Jharkhand state of India. Kodarjana is divided into two parts: Badi Kodarjana and Choti Kodarjana. Sahibganj Junction railway station is nearest railway station to this place. The economy of this village is based on agriculture specially for sugarcane, Cow milk production and mango farming. Angika is major language spoken along with official language Hindi.
