= Taljhari =

- Community development block
- Location in Jharkhand Taljhari (India)
- Coordinates: 25°4′37″N 87°44′29″E
- Country: India
- State: Jharkhand
- District: Sahibganj

Government
  - Type: Federal democracy

Area
  - Total: 273.03 km^{2} (105.42 sq mi)
- Elevation: 32 m (105 ft)

Population (2011)
  - Total: 76,330
  - Density: 279.6/km^{2} (724.1/sq mi)

Languages
  - Official: Hindi, Urdu

Literacy (2011)
  - Total literates: 29,546 (47.74%)
- Time zone: UTC+5:30 (IST)
- PIN: 816129 (Taljhari)
- Telephone/STD code: 06426
- Vehicle registration: JH 18
- Lok Sabha constituency: Rajmahal
- Vidhan Sabha constituency: Borio
- Website: sahibganj.nic.in

Taljhari is a community development block that forms an administrative division in the Rajmahal subdivision of the Sahibganj district, Jharkhand state, India.

== Geography ==
Taljhari, the eponymous CD block headquarters, is located at 25°4′37″N 87°44′29″E.

It is located 23 km from Sahibganj, the district headquarters.

Sahebganj district may be divided into three natural divisions – (i) the hilly portion stretching from the Ganges on the north to the borders of West Bengal on the south, (ii) the uplands, undulations, long ridges and depressions, with fertile lands, and (iii) the low fertile alluvial plains lying between the hills and the Ganges, with the Sahibganj loop line passing through the narrow strip. Three rivers flowing through this region – the Ganges, Gumani and Bansloi – make the plains rich and cultivable.

The Santhal Pargana division has about 5,120 square kilometres (1,980 sq mi) hilly tract, out of which about 3,471 square kilometres (1,340 sq mi) is in Damin-i-koh, which is spread across Sahibganj, Godda and Dumka districts, a major portion being in Sahibganj district. The Borio, Barhait, Taljhari and Pathana CD blocks of Sahibganj district are in the Damin-i-koh tract. Dense forests once covering the hills slopes have thinned out. Paddy is produced in the valleys. Barbatti and maize are grown in the hill area. Paharias, Mal Paharias and Santals generally inhabit the area.

Taljhari CD block is bounded by Sahibganj CD block on the north, Rajmahal and Udhwa CD blocks on the east, Barhait CD block on the south and Borio on the west.

Taljhari CD block has an area of 273.03 km^{2}.Taljhari police station serves this block. Headquarters of this CD block is at Taljhari village.

Taljhari CD block has 195 inhabited (chiragi) and 78 uninhabited (bechiragi) villages.

== Demographics ==
=== Population ===
According to the 2011 Census of India, Taljhari CD block had a total population of 76,330, all of which were rural. There were 38,659 (51%) males and 37,671 (49%) females. Population in the age range 0–6 years was 14,435. Scheduled Castes numbered 5,067 (6.64%) and Scheduled Tribes numbered 42,348 (55.48%).

In the 2011 census, Taljhari had a population of 1,377.

=== Literacy ===
According to the 2011 census, the total number of literate persons in Taljhari CD block was 29,546 (47.74% of the population over 6 years) out of which 18,153 (61%) were males and 11,393 (39%) were females. The gender disparity (the difference between female and male literacy rates) was 22%.

See also – List of Jharkhand districts ranked by literacy rate

Literacy in CD Blocks of
Sahibganj district
Sahibganj subdivision
Sahibganj – 56.07%
Mandro – 46.03%
Borio – 42.38%
Barhait – 42.50%
Rajmahal subdivision
Taljhari – 47.74%
Rajmahal – 51.28%
Udhwa – 47.71%
Pathna – 47.71%
Barharwa – 58.54%
Source: 2011 Census: CD Block Wise
Primary Census Abstract Data

=== Language and religion ===
Religions in Taljhari Block (2011)
Religion	Percent
Hindus	61.69%
Christians	20.92%
Muslims	9.89%
Sarna	7.05%
Other or not stated	0.45%

Hindus are the largest religious group. Christians are the second largest minority, with Muslims and Sarna also having strong followings.

Languages of Taljhari block (2011)
1. Santali (38.9%)
2. Hindi (22.9%)
3. Malto (13.6%)
4. Khortha (11.2%)
5. Bengali (4.12%)
6. 'Other' Hindi (3.16%)
7. Urdu (2.49%)
8. Kurukh (1.85%)
9. Bhojpuri (1.50%)
10. Others (0.31%)

At the time of the 2011 census, 38.85% of the population spoke Santali, 22.90% Hindi, 13.64% Malto, 11.18% Khortha, 4.12% Bengali, 2.13% Urdu, 1.85% Kurukh and 1.50% Bhojpuri as their first language. Those speaking 'Others' under Hindi made up 3.16% of the population, mainly speakers of Angika.

== Rural poverty ==
50-60% of the population of Sahibganj district were in the BPL category in 2004–2005, being in the same category as Pakur, Deoghar and Garhwa districts."Based on the number of the total rural households in Census 2011 and BPL Revision Survey of 2010-11 the percentage of BPL households in rural areas is 86.03 percent." Rural poverty in Jharkhand declined from 66% in 1993–94 to 46% in 2004–05. In 2011, it has come down to 39.1%.

== Economy ==
=== Livelihood ===
Livelihood
in Taljhari CD block
1. Cultivators (34.8%)
2. Agricultural labourers (38.6%)
3. Household industries (3.32%)
4. Other Workers (23.2%)

In Taljhari CD block in 2011, amongst the class of total workers, cultivators numbered 12,365 and formed 34.80%, agricultural labourers numbered 13,727 and formed 38.63%, household industry workers numbered 1,179 and formed 3.32% and other workers numbered 8,260 and formed 23.25%. Total workers numbered 35,531 and formed 46.55% of the total population. Non-workers numbered 40,799 and formed 53.45% of total population.

Note: In the census records a person is considered a cultivator, if the person is engaged in cultivation/ supervision of land owned. When a person who works on another person's land for wages in cash or kind or share, is regarded as an agricultural labourer. Household industry is defined as an industry conducted by one or more members of the family within the household or village, and one that does not qualify for registration as a factory under the Factories Act. Other workers are persons engaged in some economic activity other than cultivators, agricultural labourers and household workers. It includes factory, mining, plantation, transport and office workers, those engaged in business and commerce, teachers and entertainment artistes.

=== Infrastructure ===
There are 205 inhabited villages in Taljhari CD block. In 2011, 40 villages had power supply. 20 villages had tap water (treated/ untreated), 192 villages had well water (covered/ uncovered), 98 villages had hand pumps, and 1 village did not have drinking water facility. 10 village had post offices, 3 villages had sub post offices, 9 villages had telephones (land lines), 15 villages had public call offices and 58 villages had mobile phone coverage. 154 villages had pucca (paved) roads, 8 villages had bus service (private/public), 9 villages had auto/ modified auto, 11 villages had taxis/ vans, 35 villages had tractors, 5 villages had navigable waterways. 2 villages had bank branches, 4 villages had agricultural credit societies, 5 villages had cinema/ video hall, 4 villages had public library and public reading room. 40 villages had public distribution system, 19 villages had weekly haat (market) and 44 villages had assembly polling stations.

=== Agriculture ===
A large part of Sahibganj district is hilly and most of the thick forests are gone. Some of the plains are cultivable. The livelihood scenario presented above indicates that a large population depends on agriculture. In Taljhari CD block 25.74% of the total area is cultivable area and 8.43% of the cultivable area is irrigated area.

=== Backward Regions Grant Fund ===
Sahibganj district is listed as a backward region and receives financial support from the Backward Regions Grant Fund. The fund created by the Government of India is designed to redress regional imbalances in development. As of 2012, 272 districts across the country were listed under this scheme. The list includes 21 districts of Jharkhand.

== Transport ==
The Sahibganj Loop line passes through this block. Taljhari railway station is situated at Taljhari.

== Tourism ==
Moti Jharna (pearl cascade) is the most picturesque waterfall in Sahebganj district, at the head of a picturesque glen of the Rajmahal hills.

== Education ==
Taljhari CD block had 20 villages with pre-primary schools, 116 villages with primary schools, 38 villages with middle schools, 3 villages with secondary schools, 1 village with senior secondary school, 89 villages with no educational facility.
*Senior secondary schools are also known as Inter colleges in Jharkhand

== Healthcare ==
Taljhari CD block had 9 villages with primary health centres, 2 villages with primary health subcentres, 1 village with maternity and child welfare centre, 1 village with allopathic hospital, 1 villages with dispensaries, 6 villages with veterinary hospitals, 6 villages with medicine shops.
.*Private medical practitioners, alternative medicine etc. not included
