= Patra, Sahibganj =

Patra
- Census Town
- Location in Jharkhand, India Patra (India)
- Coordinates: 24.970078°N 87.842478°E
- Country: India
- State: Jharkhand
- District: Sahibganj

Area
  - Total: 6.26 km^{2} (2.42 sq mi)

Population (2011)
  - Total: 9,536
  - Density: 1,520/km^{2} (3,950/sq mi)

Languages (*For language details see Udhwa (community development block)#Language and religion)
  - Official: Hindi, Urdu
- Time zone: UTC+5:30 (IST)
- PIN: 816108
- Telephone/ STD code: 06426
- Lok Sabha constituency: Rajmahal
- Vidhan Sabha constituency: Rajmahal
- Website: sahibganj.nic.in

Patra is a census town in the Udhwa CD block in the Rajmahal subdivision of the Sahibganj district in the eastern Indian state of Jharkhand.

Patra has an area of 6.26 square kilometres (2.42 sq mi).

Cities, towns and locations in the Sahibganj, Godda and Pakur districts in Santhal Pargana Division
M: municipality, CT: census town, R: rural/ urban centre, H: historical/ religious/ tourist centre
Owing to space constraints in the small map, the actual locations in a larger map may vary slightly

== Demographics ==
According to the 2011 Census of India, Patra had a population of 9,536, of which 4,845 (51%) were males and 4,691 (49%) were females. Population in the age range 0–6 years was 2,408. The total number of literate persons in Patra was 3,350 (47.00% of the population over 6 years).

== Infrastructure ==
According to the District Census Handbook 2011, Sahibganj, Patra covered an area of 6.26 km^{2}. Among the civic amenities, it had 10 km roads with open drains, the protected water supply involved hand pump, uncovered well. It had 141 domestic electric connections. Among the educational facilities it had 2 primary schools, 1 middle school, 2 secondary schools, 2 senior secondary schools. It had the branch offices of 1 nationalised bank, 1 cooperative bank.
