= Udhwa =

Udhwa Udhua
- Location in India Udhwa (India)
- Coordinates: 24.969278°N 87.856278°E
- Country: India
- State: Jharkhand
- District: Sahibganj
- Named for: Saint Uddhava

Population (2011)
  - Total: 13,139

Languages (*For language details see Udhwa (community development block)#Language and religion)
  - Official: Hindi, Urdu
- Time zone: UTC5:30 (IST)
- PIN: 816108
- Vehicle registration: JH

Udhwa (also spelled Udhua) is a village in the Uddhwa CD block in the Rajmahal subdivision of the Sahibganj district in the Indian state of Jharkhand.

== Etymology ==
Udhwa is named after saint Uddhava of Mahabharat times, a friend of God Krishna and philosopher of Sankhya Yoga. It is believed that Udhwa was the place of Saint Uddhava.

== History ==
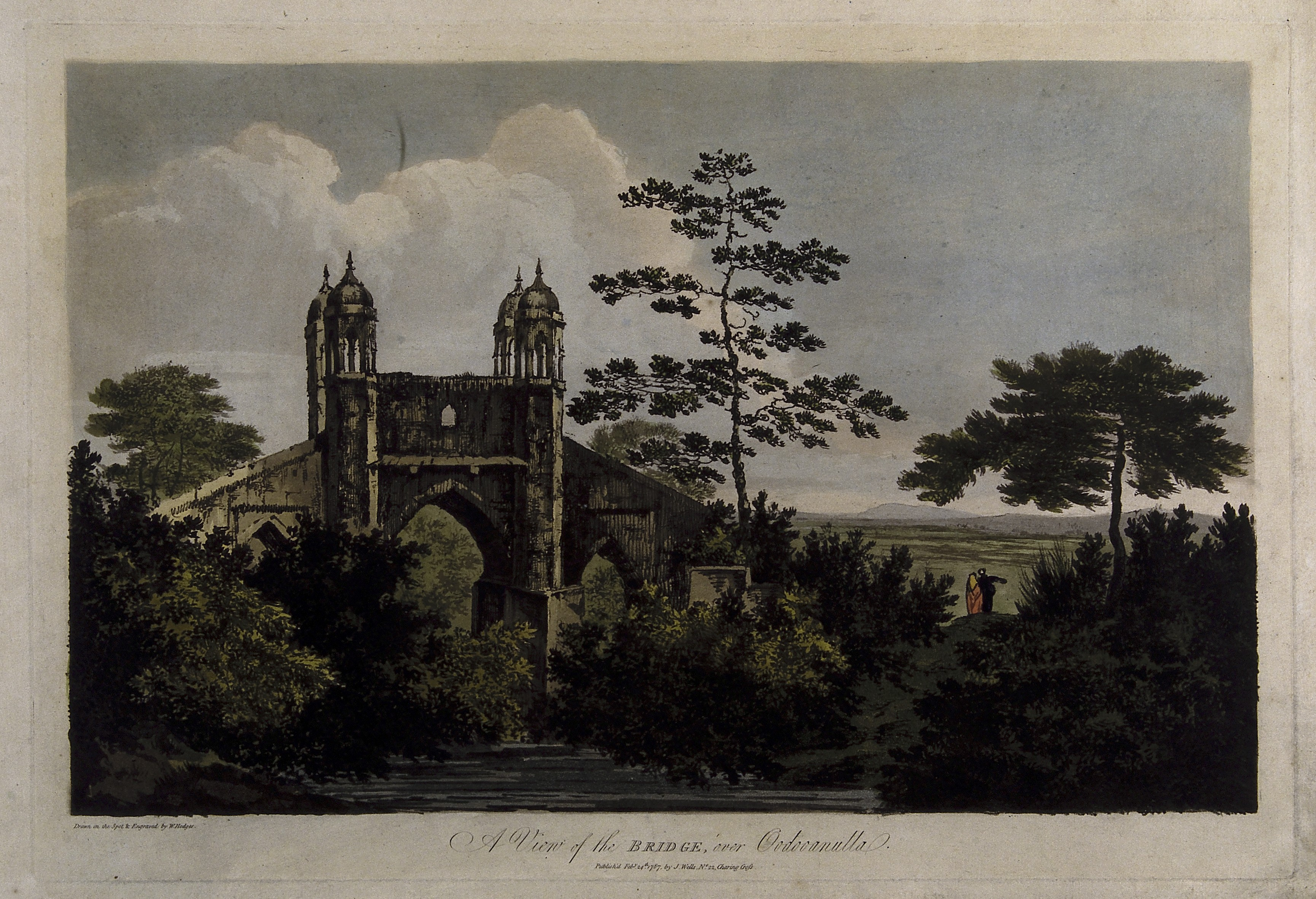
Bridge at Oodooanulla, drawn in 1781. A coloured etching by William Hodges

=== Battle of Udhwa nala ===
The Battle of Udhwa nala between Mir Qasim, and the British (1763) was centered here. Mir Qasim was Nawab (King) of Bengal (including areas of present days Bangladesh and Indian states West Bengal, Bihar, Jharkhand and Orissa). Nawab Mir Qasim was defeated by the British and fled with his family to the Rohtas, Bihar, but was not able to hide at the Rohtasgarh Fort, which the Diwan of Rohtas, Shahmal, finally handed over to British captain Goddard.

== Geography ==
Cities, towns and locations in the Sahibganj, Godda and Pakur districts in Santhal Pargana Division
M: municipality, CT: census town, R: rural/ urban centre, H: historical/ religious/ tourist centre
Owing to space constraints in the small map, the actual locations in a larger map may vary slightly

=== Location ===
Udhhwa is located at 24.969278°N 87.856278°E.

Udhua has an area of 320 hectares (790 acres).

=== Overview ===
The map shows a hilly area with the Rajmahal hills running from the bank of the Ganges in the extreme north to the south, beyond the area covered by the map into Dumka district. ‘Farakka’ is marked on the map and that is where Farakka Barrage is, just inside West Bengal. Rajmahal coalfield is shown in the map. The entire area is overwhelmingly rural with only small pockets of urbanisation.

Note: All places marked on the map are linked and you can easily move on to another page of your choice. Enlarge the map to see what else is there – one gets railway links, many more road links and so on.

== Udhwa Bird Sanctuary ==
Udhwa Bird Sanctuary, spreading in 5.65 square kilometers is the only bird sanctuary of Jharkhand state. This avian habitat comprises two backwater lakes over river Ganges (Ganga) namely Patauda and Berhale. Migratory birds reach here every winter from several parts of the World, including Siberia and Europe. The main birds include the pratincole, egret, wagtail, plover, lapwing, stork, ibis and heron.

Udhwa Lake Bird Sanctuary, is an ecologically significant wetland formed as a Ganga backwater wetland, which helps in water regulation by releasing excess water back into the river. It was formed as part of the oxbow lake concept from the River Ganga, making it naturally interlinked with the river. Due to this interconnection, the National Mission for Clean Ganga (NMCG) has taken special interest in its conservation and management. Recognizing its ecological importance, Udhwa Lake Bird Sanctuary was declared a Ramsar site on 1 February 2025.

According to the Asian Waterbird Census (AWC) Report – 2024, conducted from 20 to 22 January 2024, a total of 58 species of wetland birds belonging to 16 families were recorded at Pataura, Behale, and Purulia. Of these, 45 species were classified as water birds, while 13 were wetland-dependent birds. Additionally, the recorded species included 18 resident birds, 18 resident migrants, and 22 migratory birds. A total of 18,009 birds were observed at Udhwa Lake Bird Sanctuary during the census, and notably, six globally threatened species were recorded.

== Demographics ==
According to the 2011 Census of India, Udhua had a total population of 13,139, of which 6,719 (51%) were males and 6,420 (49%) were females. Population in the age range 0–6 years was 2,744. The total number of literate persons in Udhua was 5,382 (51.77% of the population over 6 years).

== Civic administration ==
=== CD block HQ ===
Headquarters of the Udhwa CD block is at Udhwa village.

== See also ==
- Ganges(Ganga) River
- Barharwa
