= Bansloi River =

Coordinates: 24°31′05″N 87°31′07″E

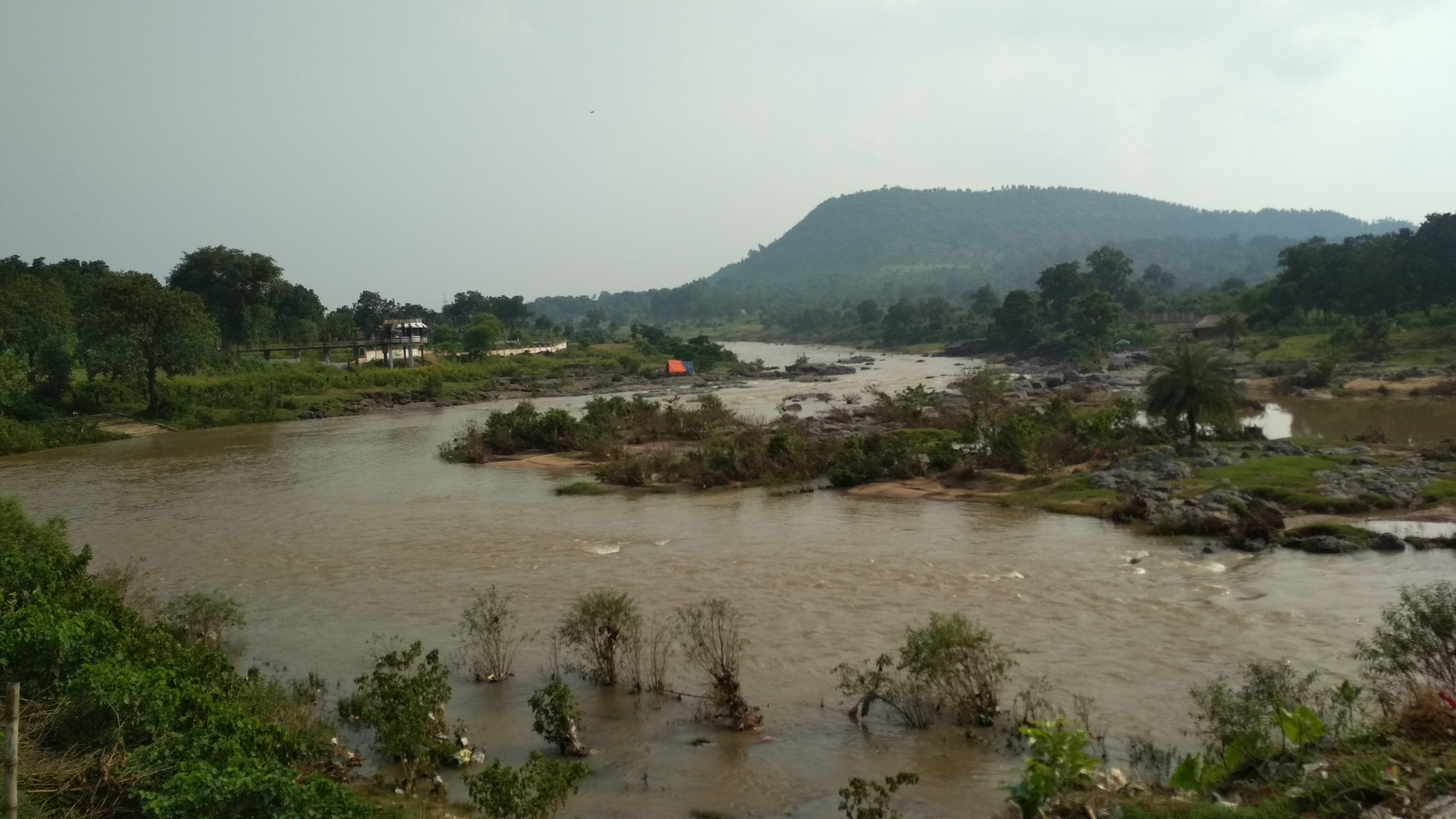
- Bansloi River in Amrapara

Location
- Country: India
- State: Jharkhand, West Bengal

Physical characteristics
- Source: Bans Hill
  - location: Sahebganj district, Santhal Parganas
- Mouth: Bhagirathi

The Bansloi River is a tributary of the Bhagirathi.

== Geography ==
The Bansloi River originates on Bans Hill in Sahebganj district of Jharkhand, flows through Pakur district of Jharkhand and Birbhum and Murshidabad districts of West Bengal before flowing into the Bhagirathi north of Jangipur

The western half of Murshidabad district slopes eastwards toward the Bhagirathi; a number of the hill streams do not find their way directly into that river; they are intercepted by beels or marshes. The large beels act as reservoirs during a flood absorbing some of the excess water carried down by these streams, and also drain the excess water through the streams, emanating out of them. The Bansloi enters the northern part of the district.

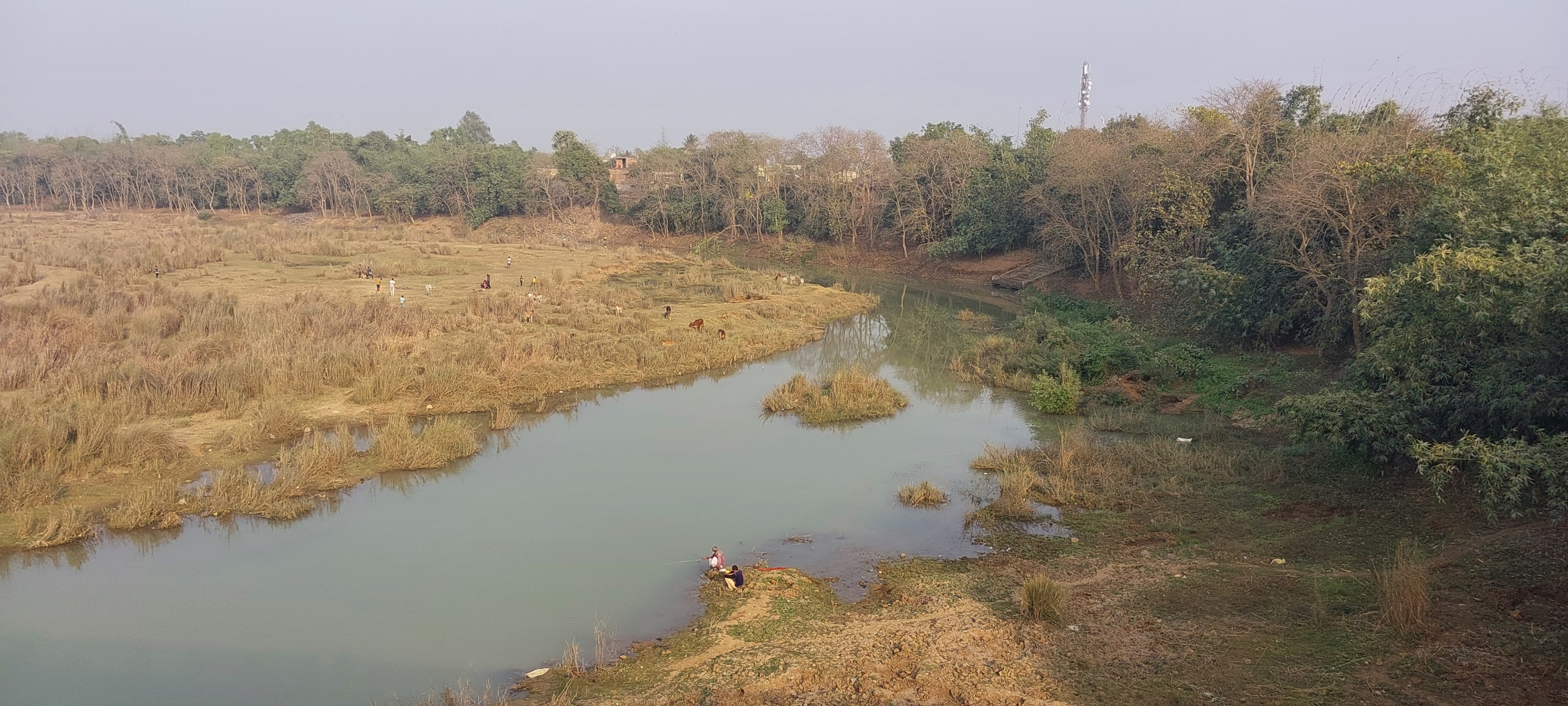
Bansloi River in Birbhum district

The combined catchment area of the Pagla–Bansloi river system is 2,200 square kilometres (850 mi^{2}).

=== Floods ===
A number of rivers that originate on the Chota Nagpur Plateau or in Jharkhand, including the Bansloi, flow into Birbhum district. These rivers then enter the Murshidabad and Bardhaman districts before joining the Bhagirathi. They generate flood because of high rainfall in their basins and limited carrying capacity of the river Bhagirathi between the towns of Jangipur and Kalna. In this reach the Bhagirathi has discharge carrying capacity of maximum 3,100 cubic metres per second (110,000 cu ft/s). If all the rivers receive rainfall simultaneously in their catchment areas they can generate run-off volume of any amount up to 17,000 cubic metres per second (600,000 cu ft/s) at their outfall at the Bhagirathi. Thus floods are caused regularly.

== See also ==
List of rivers of India
