= Sahebganj district =

Sahibganj district
- District of Jharkhand
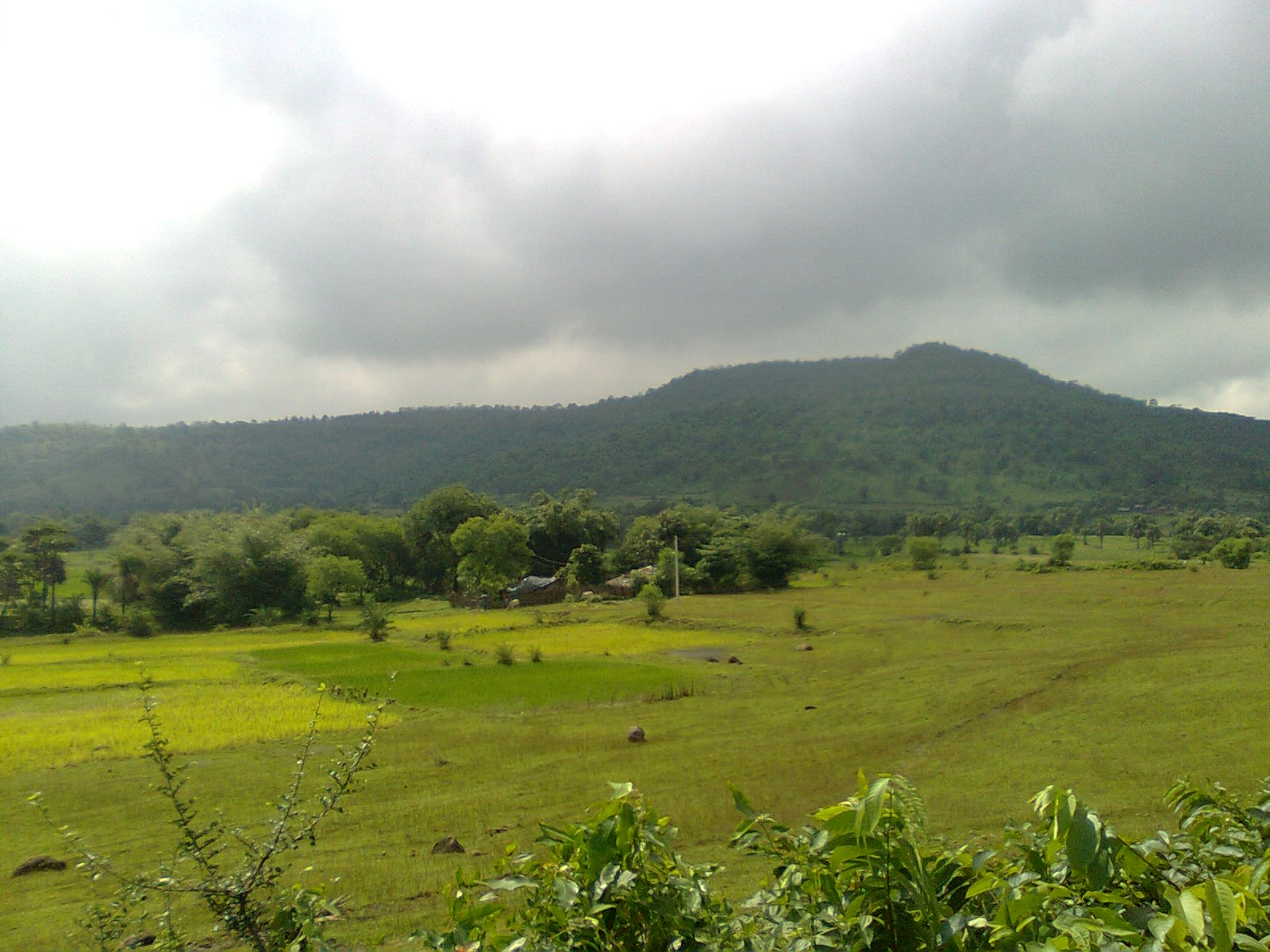
- Rajmahal hills near Barhait
- Interactive map of Sahibganj district
- Coordinates (Sahebganj): 25.25°N 87.65°E
- Country: India
- State: Jharkhand
- Division: Santhal Pargana
- Headquarters: Sahebganj

Government
  - Deputy Commissioner: Shri Hemant Sati (IAS)
  - Lok Sabha constituencies: Rajmahal
  - Vidhan Sabha constituencies: 3

Area
  - Total: 2,063 km^{2} (797 sq mi)

Population (2011)
  - Total: 1,150,567
  - Density: 557.7/km^{2} (1,444/sq mi)

Demographics
  - Literacy: 52.04%
  - Sex ratio: 948
- Time zone: UTC+05:30 (IST)
- Vehicle registration: JH-18
- Website: http://sahibganj.nic.in/

Sahibganj district is one of the twenty-four districts of Jharkhand state, India, and Sahibganj is the administrative headquarters of this district. Sahibganj district is located in north eastern part of jharkhand.

== Divisions ==
Sahibganj district is divided into two subdivions: Sahibganj subdivision and Rajmahal subdivision. It is further subdivided into nine Community development blocks:

Sahibganj subdivision

- Sahibganj
- Mandro
- Borio
- Barhait

Rajmahal subdivision

- Taljhari
- Rajmahal
- Udhwa
- Pathna
- Barharwa.

== Economy ==
In 2006 the Ministry of Panchayati Raj named Sahibganj one of the country's 250 most backward districts (out of a total of 640). It is one of the 24 districts in Jharkhand currently receiving funds from the Backward Regions Grant Fund Programme (BRGF).

== Demographics ==
Historical population
Year	Pop.	±% p.a.
1901	269,359	—
1911	280,249	+0.40%
1921	267,749	−0.46%
1931	306,039	+1.35%
1941	333,540	+0.86%
1951	346,615	+0.39%
1961	414,277	+1.80%
1971	507,180	+2.04%
1981	615,599	+1.96%
1991	736,835	+1.81%
2001	927,770	+2.33%
2011	1,150,567	+2.18%

Religions in Sahibganj district (2011)
Religion	Percent
Hinduism	54.59%
Islam	34.61%
Christianity	7.23%
Sarna	3.34%
Other or not stated	0.23%

CD Block	Hindu %	Muslim %	Other %
Sahibganj	75.01	23.90	1.09
Rajmahal	51.23	45.57	3.20
Udhwa	34.62	63.73	1.55
Barharwa	45.33	52.35	2.32
Taljhari	61.69	9.89	28.42
Mandro	57.16	20.24	22.60
Borio	68.68	13.59	17.73
Barhait	57.72	20.20	22.08
Pathna	53.89	15.47	30.64

According to the 2011 census Sahibganj district has a population of 1,150,567, roughly equal to the nation of Timor-Leste or the US state of Rhode Island. This gives it a ranking of 407th in India (out of a total of 640). The district has a population density of 558 inhabitants per square kilometre (1,450/sq mi). Its population growth rate over the decade 2001-2011 was 23.96%. Sahibganj has a sex ratio of 948 females for every 1000 males, and a literacy rate of 52.04%. 13.88% of the population lives in urban areas. Scheduled Castes and Scheduled Tribes make up 6.29% and 26.80% of the population respectively.

Languages of Sahibganj district (2011)
1. Bengali (28.9%)
2. Santali (21.9%)
3. Hindi (16.7%)
4. Khortha (11.4%)
5. Urdu (6.33%)
6. Bhojpuri (5.33%)
7. 'Other' Hindi (4.11%)
8. Malto (3.68%)
9. Others (1.70%)

At the time of the 2011 Census of India, 28.86% of the population in the district spoke Bengali, 21.86% Santali, 16.71% Hindi, 11.42% Khortha, 6.33% Urdu, 5.33% Bhojpuri and 3.68% Malto. 4.11% of the population spoke 'Others' under Hindi.

== Politics ==
District	No.	Constituency	Name	Party	Alliance	Remarks	Sahebganj	1	Rajmahal	Mohammad Tajuddin	JMM	MGB
2	Borio	Dhananjay Soren					Sahebganj				JMM	MGB
3	Barhait	Hemant Soren	Chief Minister				Sahebganj				JMM	MGB

== Localities ==
- Bishanpur
- Kodarjana
- Sahibganj
