= Ports in West Bengal =

Ports in West Bengal support international trade. Since ancient times, trade in West Bengal has been closely related to the river and seaports. The waterways have still not lost their importance. The primary port in the eastern Indian state of West Bengal is the Port of Calcutta. This Port is managed by the Calcutta Port Trust.

West Bengal has a coastline of 157 km in South 24 Pargana district and East Midnapore districts. The Seaport was built on the banks of the Hooghly River and coastline in West Bengal. Kolkata Port is India's oldest port. Almost 50 million tons per year goods pass through the port of West Bengal. About 45 million tons of cargo per year are transported to Kolkata port (including Haldia port). Annually more than 6 million TEUs containers pass through West Bengal ports.

== Maritime Board ==
The West Bengal Maritime Board was established on 24 October 2015 as a nodal agency for the development of maritime sector in the state of West Bengal. It comes under the aegis of West Bengal Industrial Development Corporation.

== List ==
Port name	Image	Location	Area	Type	Category	Status
Haldia Port		Haldia	1,982 km2	Major	Riverine port	Active
Port of Kolkata		Kolkata	18km2	Major	Riverine port	Active
Budge Budge Port		Budge Budge	9.06 km2	Minor	Riverine port	Active
Farakka Port		Farakka	2.06 km2	Minor	Riverine port	Active
Tajpur Port		Tajpur	NA	Major	Seaport	Proposed
Sagar Port		Sagar	NA	Minor	Seaport	Proposed
Kulpi Port		Kulpi	NA	Minor	Riverine port	Proposed
