= Haldia Multi-Modal Terminal =

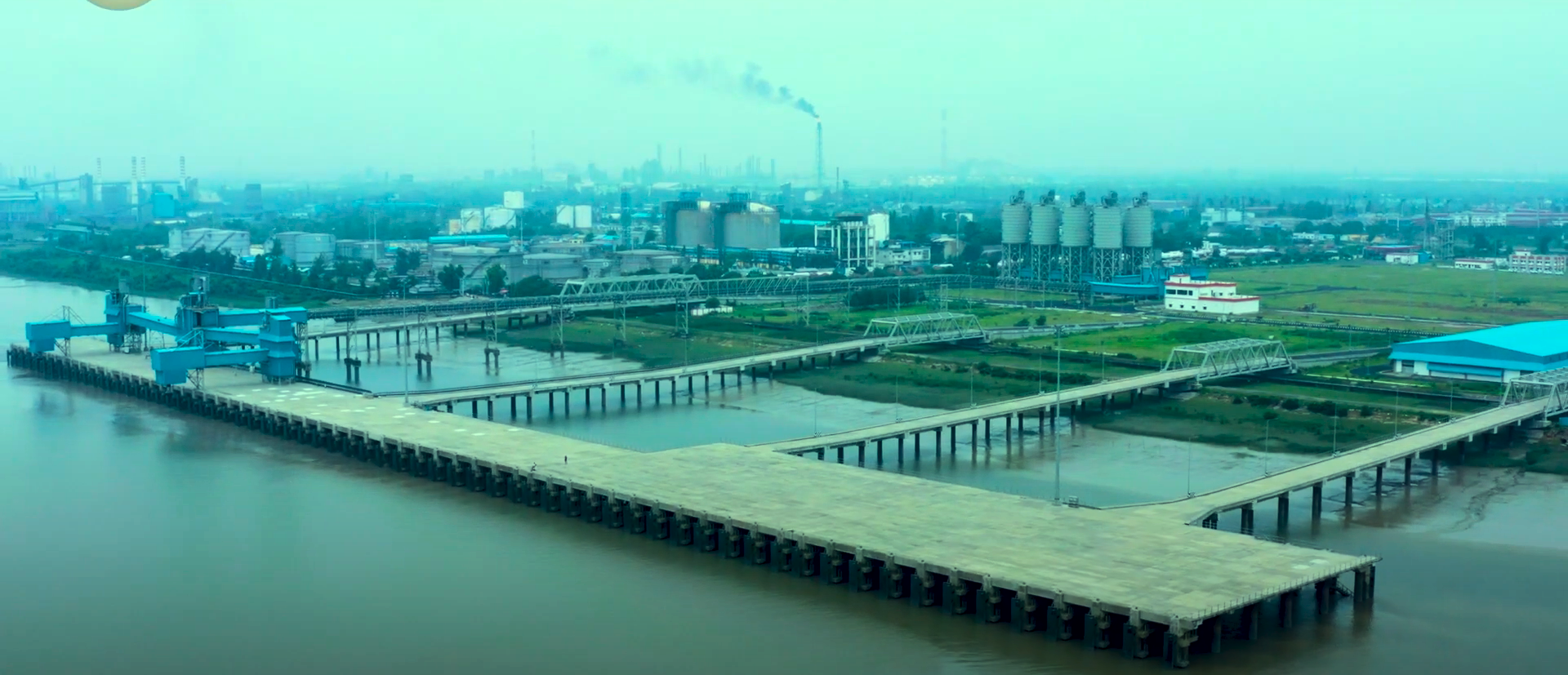
- Areal view of Haldia Terminal
- Click on the map for a fullscreen view

Location
- Country: India
- Location: Durgachak, West Bengal
- Coordinates: 22°03′30″N 88°8′40″E

Details
- Operated by: Inland Waterways Authority of India
- Owned by: Inland Waterways Authority of India
- Type of harbour: River Port
- Draft: 2.5 metres (8 ft 2 in)

The Haldia Multi-Modal Terminal or Durgachak Port is a inland-port in Durgachak, a satellite township of Port City Haldia in East Midnapore district of West Bengal and a small barrier set for small ships. The terminal is built near the Haldia Port. The terminal built as a inland-river port with 61 acres of land. The terminal is built by Inland Waterways Authority of India by help of West Bengal and the Calcutta Port Trust.

Cargo is handled through flyash berths and multi-purpose berths located within the terminal's jetty. It have a maximum depth of 3.2 metres (10 ft) and able big barge. According to the Inland Waterways Authority of India, the draft of the port is around 2.5 metres (8.2 ft) with tidal support, which accommodate 3,000 DWT (deadweight tonnage) vessels at the terminal's jetty.

== Background ==
Due to the shortage of pontoon transport through the waterway, the government of India has decided to transport the commodity to the waterways as compared to the road and railways. For this, the government announced that the goods will be transported from Haldia to Allahabad by sea. For this, the government began to build uplines for small ships or barges in the Hooghly and Ganges rivers. It is said from the government that the terminals will be constructed in Haldia Sahebganj and Varanasi for shipping the goods through the waterway. To this end, construction of multi-modal terminals in Haldia began.

== Terminal details ==
=== harbour ===
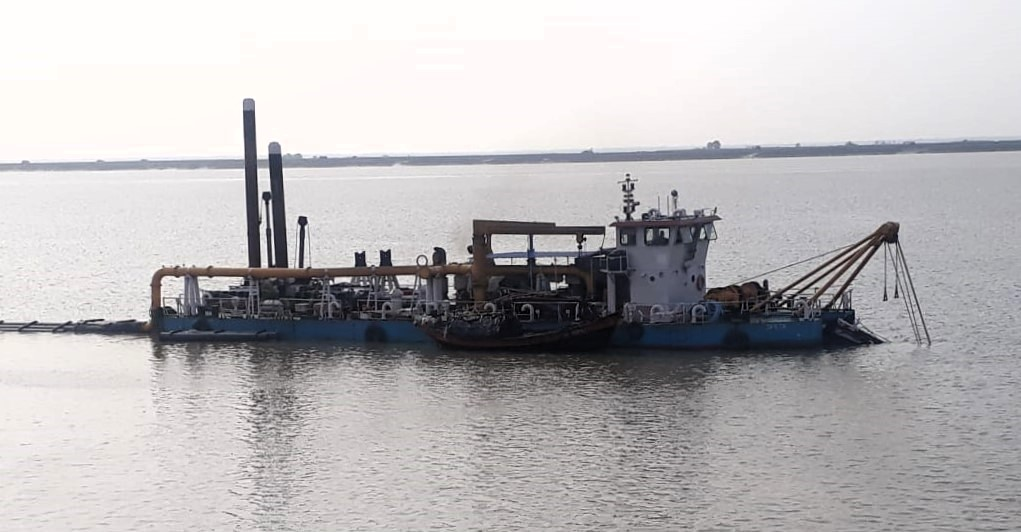
In May 2024, dredging is underway by cutter suction dredger Sweta to achieve the prescribed depth in front of the Haldia multi-model terminal jetty.

The harbour of the terminal has a natural harbor, which is protected by balari sandbar. The water depth of the harbour basin is 3.2 metres (10 ft), which accommodate large barges. The approach channel forms a turning circle with 190 metres (620 ft) diameter in the harbour with a depth of 2.5 metres (8.2 ft), which is used to change the direction of the vessel as required before berthing the vessel at the jetty.

=== Approach channel ===
Depth of water in the channel
Depth		Measure (meters)
Condition	Value	Measure (meters)
Natural depth	Range	1.2–5 metres (3.9–16.4 ft)
Natural depth	Dredged	3.2 metres (10 ft)
Tidal depth	Maximum	4–8.9 metres (13–29 ft)

The approach channel connects the 5 metres (16 ft) deep water body to the harbour, Which is constructed by dredging the riverbed from 0.8–1.5 metres (2.6–4.9 ft) to 5 metres (16 ft) deep. An 7 kilometers long approach channel at river will be used for the movement of barges to the terminal's jetty. The approach channel has a depth of 3.2 metres (10 ft) and a minimum width of 45 meters, allowing vessels with a draft of 2.5 metres (8.2 ft) to arrive and depart the harbor without tidal assistance. However, the highest and lowest tides observed in the harbor area are 0.8 metres (2.6 ft) and 7.26 metres (23.8 ft) meters respectively, which can significantly increase the depth of the approach channel. At high tide the channel more than 8.5 metres (28 ft) deep with tidal support; vessels with a draft of 2.5 metres (8.2 ft) or more are able to navigate during this period.

== Transport of product ==
The proposed Haldia multipurpose terminal in West Bengal will become a major hub for the transportation of goods in West Bengal and north-east India. The terminal has the promise and potential of 5.92 MMPPA freight traffic by 2018.The main products that will be transported through this terminal include fly ash, banaspati oil, cement etc.

== See also ==
- National Waterway 1
- Varanasi Multi-Modal Terminal
- Sahebgang Multimodal Terminal

== Bibliography ==
- Dhar, Sanjeev (February 2017). Detailed Feasibility Study for Capacity Augmentation of National Waterway-1 and Detailed Engineering for its Ancillary Works and Processes between Haldia to Allahabad (Jal Marg Vikas Project) — Detailed Project Report–Haldia Multimodal Terminal (PDF). Engineering Projects (India) Ltd (Report). Inland Waterways Authority of India (Ministry of Shipping, Government of India).
