= Haldia Dock Complex =

Dock facility in Syama Prasad Mookerjee Port, Kolkata

Haldia Dock Complex হলদিয়া ডক কমপ্লেক্স
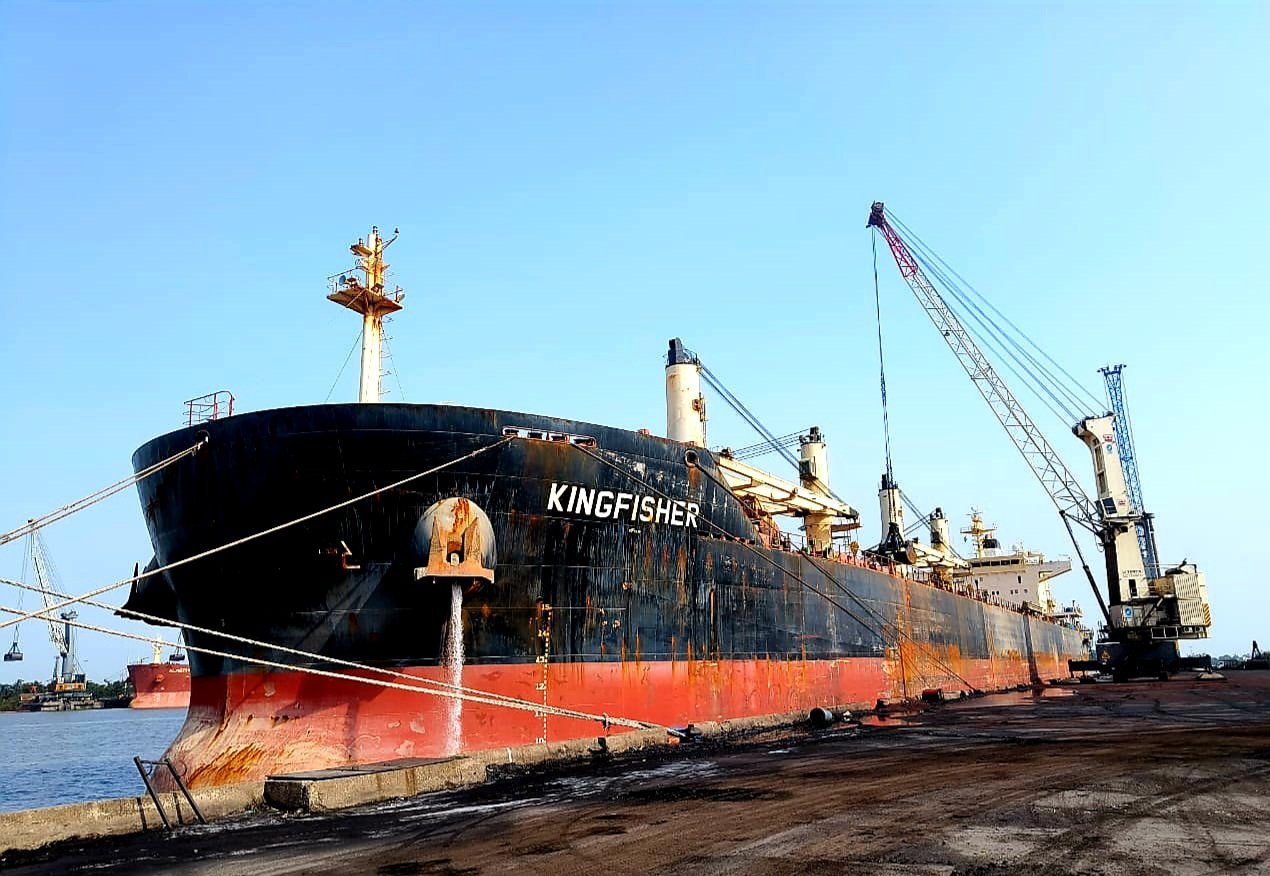
- MV Kingfisher at Berth No. 14 of Haldia Dock Complex
- Interactive map of Haldia Dock Complex হলদিয়া ডক কমপ্লেক্স

Location
- Country: India
- Location: Haldia, West Bengal
- Coordinates: 22.0447°N 88.0888°E

Details
- Opened: 1977; 49 years ago
- Operated by: Syama Prasad Mukherjee Port Authority
- Owned by: Syama Prasad Mukherjee Port Authority, Ministry of Ports, Shipping and Waterways, Government of India
- Type of Harbor: River tide gate, and river natural
- Size: 6,367 acres (25.77 km^{2})
- No. of berths: 12
- No. of wharfs: 6
- Draft depth: 9.1 metres (30 ft) (Maximum)
- Water depth: 12.5 metres (41 ft)

Statistics
- Annual cargo tonnage: 51.855 million tonnes (2025-2026)
- Annual container volume: 226,378 TEUs (2025–26)
- Net income: ₹632 crore (US$66 million) (2022–23)

The Haldia Dock Complex (HDC) also popularly known as Haldia Port is a docking facility on the Hooghly River in Haldia, West Bengal, India. It is one of the two dock systems under the Syama Prasad Mookerjee Port, Kolkata, with the other being the Kolkata Dock System (KDS). The facility specializes in handling dry and liquid bulk cargo. It is located about 130 kilometres (81 mi) from the sandheads–deep sea area of the Bay of Bengal, 45 kilometres (28 mi) upstream from Pilotage Station at Sagar and 104 km (65 mi) downstream of Kolkata. In 1968, an oil jetty was commissioned at Haldia, and officially in 1977 the dock facility of Haldia started functioning.

It consists of a dock enclosed by lock and riverside jetties. The dock have container terminal, dry cargo terminal and bulk cargo terminal, and river jetties mainly handle liquid products. The dock is mainly handles fully loaded Handy size (not Handymax)–carriers of 28,000–40,000 deadweight tonnage (DWT)–vessels. It has a maximum draft depth of 9.1 metres (30 ft) and can accommodate Panamax vessels up to 230 metres (750 ft) long with cargoes of 40 to 50 percent of its capacity. The dock operates floating crane facilities at the deep drafted anchorages located at Sagar and sandheads to accommodate large vessels for discharging bulk cargoes, liquid products are discharged in the Sandheads through Ship-to-ship cargo transfer.

The Haldia Dock Complex support the hinterland of Central, East and Northeast India. It mainly transports bulk cargoes; handled 51.855 million metric tonnes of cargoes in the 2025–26 financial year. It also handled over 0.22 million (2.2 lakh) TEUs containers in 2025–26. The Shyamaprasad Mukherjee Port (Kolkata) handles most of the cargoes through the Port.

== Location and meteorology ==
Haldia Dock Complex is eight meters above sea level and is located at 21.20 north and 88.06 east. It is 156 nautical miles (289 km; 180 mi) north of Paradip Port by sea and river route, and 104 kilometres (65 mi) south of Kolkata Dock System by river route. The dock is situated about 130 kilometres (81 mi) north of the deep sea (Sandhead) and 30 kilometres (19 mi) inland from the Bay of Bengal by river. It is developed on the western bank of the Hooghly River at the confluence of the Hooghly and Haldi rivers in the Tamluk subdivision of Purba Medinipur district in the southern part of the state of West Bengal in eastern India.

The Haldia Dock Complex is located on the eastern coast of India in the Lower Gangetic Plain which is part of a flat plain known as the Gangetic Plain; the land slope is fairly flat. Haldia has seasonal temperature variations; April and May are the warmest months, while December and January are the coldest months. The highest temperature recorded so far is 44.90°C (May) and the lowest temperature is 6.90°C (December), which was recorded in 1975. The dock area receives most of its seasonal rainfall from the southwest monsoon from June to September, with an average rainfall of 250 mm. Occasionally, cyclones formed in the Bay of Bengal hit the coast. Average monthly rainfall is less than 50 mm from November to February under the influence of northwest monsoon.

It is situated on alluvial plain, mainly formed from silt carried by the Hooghly and Haldi rivers. The area surrounding the dock falls under Seismic Zone III indicating a moderate risk of earthquakes. As there is no natural harbour, the dock is constructed by excavating the land along the river. The maximum depth is up to 12.5 metres (41 ft) and the soil in the dock entrance basin is mainly composed of silt. Visibility in the harbor area is good throughout the year and low visibility is usually associated with heavy rains caused by the southwest monsoon. On average, there are five to seven morning fogs every month from November to February.

== History ==
=== Background ===
The Kolkata Dock System was unable to handle large sea-going vessels due to the low navigability of the navigable channel of the century-old Port of Kolkata under Kolkata Port Trust. This inability threatened the economy of Kolkata and eastern India. Port of Kolkata had been facing navigability problems for long due to silting and submerged sandbar, and an alternative route was needed for shipping, which led the Government of West Bengal to consider the possibility of establishing a subsidiary dock of Kolkata Dock System.

In the 1950s, the search was on for a suitable location for a dock near the estuary of the Hooghly River, which would not pose navigational problems and would provide sufficient draft for larger ships. Among the various possible sites, Geonkhali, 60 kilometres (37 mi) south of Kolkata, was a serious contender for Haldia. Jeonkhali had 26 feet (7.9 m) draft all-round the year, and was able to accommodate ships over 530 feet (160 m) long.

In 1959, The Haldia Project Report was prepared by Rendell Palmer Triton (RPT), a UK-based port consultant. Haldia had draft of 30 feet (9.1 m) for all days, 32 feet (9.8 m) for 238 days and 35 feet (11 m) for 39 days in a year. It was expected that with dredging and river training works, the navigability would increase and by 1985, 80,000 DWT ships would be able to come to Haldia. The Barauni refinery was set up in Bihar in the 1960s, an immediate need for an oil jetty was felt to import crude oil and petroleum products, the main raw materials required for the refinery, which fueled plans to build a new port.

=== Calcutta Port Commissioners: Till 1975 ===
In the initial period, the then Chief Minister Dr. Bidhan Chandra Roy selected Geonkhali as a suitable location for setting up a satellite port of Kolkata and planned to connect it with Kolaghat through rail connectivity for improved transportation. Despite various efforts by the Government of West Bengal, the Geonkhali project was not implemented but Haldia on the right bank of the river was alternatively selected as the subsidiary port of Kolkata. It was located in relatively more navigable waterways, and was closer to the sea than the proposed Geonkhali area; in addition, there were only three submerged sandbars in fairly straight waterways and shipping channel. In 1959, the project report for the new port was prepared but was delayed due to some technical problems. The master plan envisaged the construction of a Trishula shaped dock included two entrances with lock, 47 berths, two oil jetties on the river bank and two large dry docks. Posthuma, DG of the Port of Rotterdam, who advised the Government of India on the development of the country's ports, was involved in the outline of the Haldia project; dutch hydrologist Jansen, who examined river regimes. The port engineering aspect was overseen by the internationally renowned French harbor engineer Larras.

Due to its proximity to the Bay of Bengal, Haldia was designed in the early 1960s to accommodate large ships. In the late 1960s, the Haldia was first developed as a river port. Construction for the dock began in 1967. In the first phase, only 7 berths and a single oil jetty were taken under construction. The need for an oil jetty at Haldia arose in the mid-1960s, as the Barauni refinery, established in 1964 with the help of the Soviet Union, needed to be serviced by tankers through the nearest port. Construction of the first oil jetty began in 1965, which was completed in 1968 with a pipeline connecting it to the Barauni refinery. On 12 August 1968, the oil jetty began operations with the loading of 6,500T of motor oil on the IOC-chartered tanker Ampuria; motor spirit was transported from Barauni refinery.

In 1966, Calcutta Port Commissioners entrusted dredging work under Haldia project to Ivan Milutinnovic – PIM; the company had successfully completed dredging for the Paradip port project. ₹2.86 crore was paid to the company under the dredging contract. The contract involved the dredging of 1.5 million cubic meters of silt in front of the oil jetty, at approaches to the lock-gate and the dock. The dredged silt was deposited in low-lying land near the docks. The dredging work was supposed to start in 1966 and finish in 1969, but the dredgers of the Dutch company were deployed from 1973 to 1975. The daily rent for dredging was fixed at ₹1.49 lakh. The Dredger Ham-308 was deployed at Auckland (a submerged sandbars on the Hooghly River) and the Dredger Delta Bay at Middleton (another Submerged Sandbars on the Hooghly River). The proposed estimate was that dredging 76 million cubic meters of sediment would provide 12.2 metres (40 ft) of navigability for 320 days a year, and dredging 30 million cubic meters of sediment would provide 10.67 m of navigability throughout the year.

=== Calcutta Port Trust: 1975–present ===
Finally in 1977, the port gained momentum with the opening of the Haldia Dock Complex. Haldia Dock Complex, a modern dock complex of Kolkata Port Trust, was set up in 1977 to handle larger vessels, carrying bulk cargo with optimum economy. Cargo projection for the first financial year (1975-76) at Haldia Dock Complex was 21 million metric tonnes, which is 2.5 times more than the Kolkata dock system.

The Dutch dredging company had dredged 50 million cubic meters of silt up to 1977, at a total cost of ₹26 crore. By 1978, the total amount of dredging was 82 million cubic metres, including 50 million cubic meters at Auckland, 21 million cubic meters at Jellingham and 11 million cubic meters at Midleton. However, despite dredging above the estimated value, the improvement in navigability was not consistent. The Haldia project was designed for a draft of 12.2 metres (40 ft), but even after more dredging than required, the draft did not exceed 9.67 metres (31.7 ft). As a result, capital dredging has stopped; later dredging continued only for channel maintenance.

Later, the Haldia city and the Haldia Industrial Belt were developed around the port. The import of crude oil through the port began in the 1960s, leading Haldia to develop into the first petrochemical hub of West Bengal and the entire eastern India in the following decades. Thus, long before the economic liberalisation was adopted by the Government of India in the early 1990s, the Haldia dock and industrial area became an oasis for private entrepreneurs and foreign capital.

The port's navigable channel faced a navigability crisis in the late 2000s, which affected the port's normal shipping operations. The navigability crisis mainly occurred at the Jellingham and Auckland sandbars in the port's channel. The ideal navigable depth at these two locations was 6.1 metres (20 ft) and 6.3 metres (21 ft) respectively at zero tide. A survey conducted in October 2008 by the Kolkata Port Trust showed that the depth at the two locations had decreased to 3.9 metres (13 ft) and 4.3 metres (14 ft) respectively. To address the navigability crisis, the port authority conducted a survey in 2011 to introduce Eden channel as an alternative channel to Lower Auckland. The Eden channel was fully opened in 2016, which is deeper than Lower Auckland; depth of its shallow part is 6.2–6.9 metres (20–23 ft) at zero tide.

Factors such as navigable crisis in the channel, dependence on tides and lockgate for shipping led to a rapid decline in cargo volume at Haldia Dock since 2009. Vessel movement at the dock occurs only during high tide, which occurs twice a day, causing port users to shift to other east-coast deep-water ports in India. In March 2018, The Kolkata Port Trust launched a floating jetty known as the Haldia Floating Terminal under the Haldia Dock Complex, which completely ending the dependence on the lock-gate. It is capable of discharging cargo from 10-12 thousand DWT barges/mini bulk carriers; the annual capacity is 4 million metric tons. From the mid-2010s, it is planned to end the dependence on lock-gate and dock for handling liquid cargo vessels to increase the port's cargo handling. A decision was taken to shift the liquid cargo unloading facility operated within the dock to the river bank. The construction of Outer Terminal-2 started on 5 September 2019 with a target of opening in 2021, but the global COVID-19 pandemic including in West Bengal in 2020 delayed the construction. It was finally commissioned on 23 March 2022.

== Dock system ==
=== Outside lock gate ===
==== Oil jetty ====
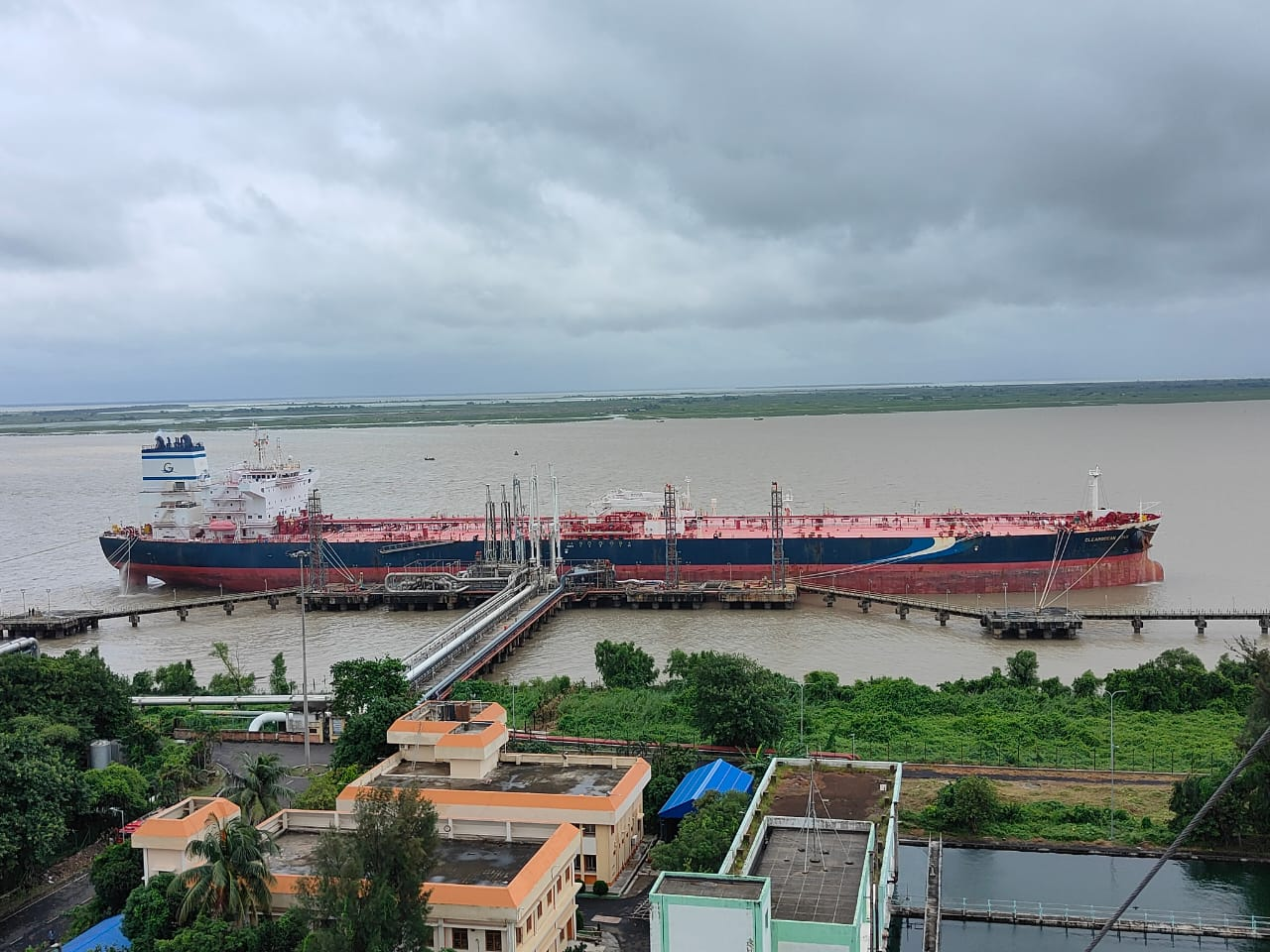
MT Clearocean Ajax With 48,111 MT of Naphtha anchored at Haldia Oil Jetty-III.

Liquid cargos at Haldia dock are primarily handling by three oil jetties on the west bank of the Hooghly River, which have a draft of 12.5 metres (41 ft). These oil jetties are known as Haldia Oil Jetty I (HOJ-I), Haldia Oil Jetty II (HOJ-I) and Haldia Oil Jetty III (HOJ-III). According to the construction design and infrastructure, HOJ-I is capable of handling tankers up to 89,000 DWT, and HOJ-II and HOJ-III of up to 1,50,000 DWT. The distance between the two outermost mooring dolphins at HOJ-I is 290 metres (950 ft), allowing vessels with a maximum length of 200 meters and a minimum length of 84 metres (276 ft). On the other hand, the distance between the two outermost mooring dolphins at HOJ-II and HOJ-III is 330 metres (1,080 ft) and 345 metres (1,132 ft) respectively; these Oil Jetties allow berthing of vessels with a maximum length of 250 metres (820 ft) and a minimum length of 160 metres (520 ft).

There are three oil jetties with an annual capacity of 10.7 million tons of liquid cargos, Of which HOJ-I, HOJ-II and HOJ-III are able to handling 2.6 million tons, 3.7 million tons and 4.4 million tons of liquid cargos annually respectively. HOJ-I has petroleum, oil and lubricants (POL) handling facilities, while HOJ-II and HOJ-III have infrastructure for importing crude oil. Crude oil, petroleum products, naphtha, liquefied petroleum gas (LPG), para-xylene, liquid ammonia, FO, various chemicals and edible oils are transported through the three jetties.

==== Outer terminal-II ====
Outer Terminal-II is located in the river between lock-gate and HOJ-II. The berth or jetty of the terminal consists of 4 mooring dolphins and a service deck. The distance between the two outermost mooring dolphins is 270 metres (890 ft), while the distance between the inner mooring and the outermost mooring dolphin is 55 metres (180 ft) and the distance between the inner mooring and centre line of the jetty is 80 metres (260 ft). The service deck is 12 metres (39 ft) long and 16 metres (52 ft) wide, and has a height of 8.70 metres (28.5 ft) above the water line (CD). The terminal is capable of accommodating vessels up to 9 metres (30 ft) in draft and 185 metres (607 ft) in length. As per construction design and infrastructure, Outer Terminal-II is capable of handling tankers of maximum size of 40,000 DWT. It mainly handling edible oil.

==== Floating cargo handling terminal ====
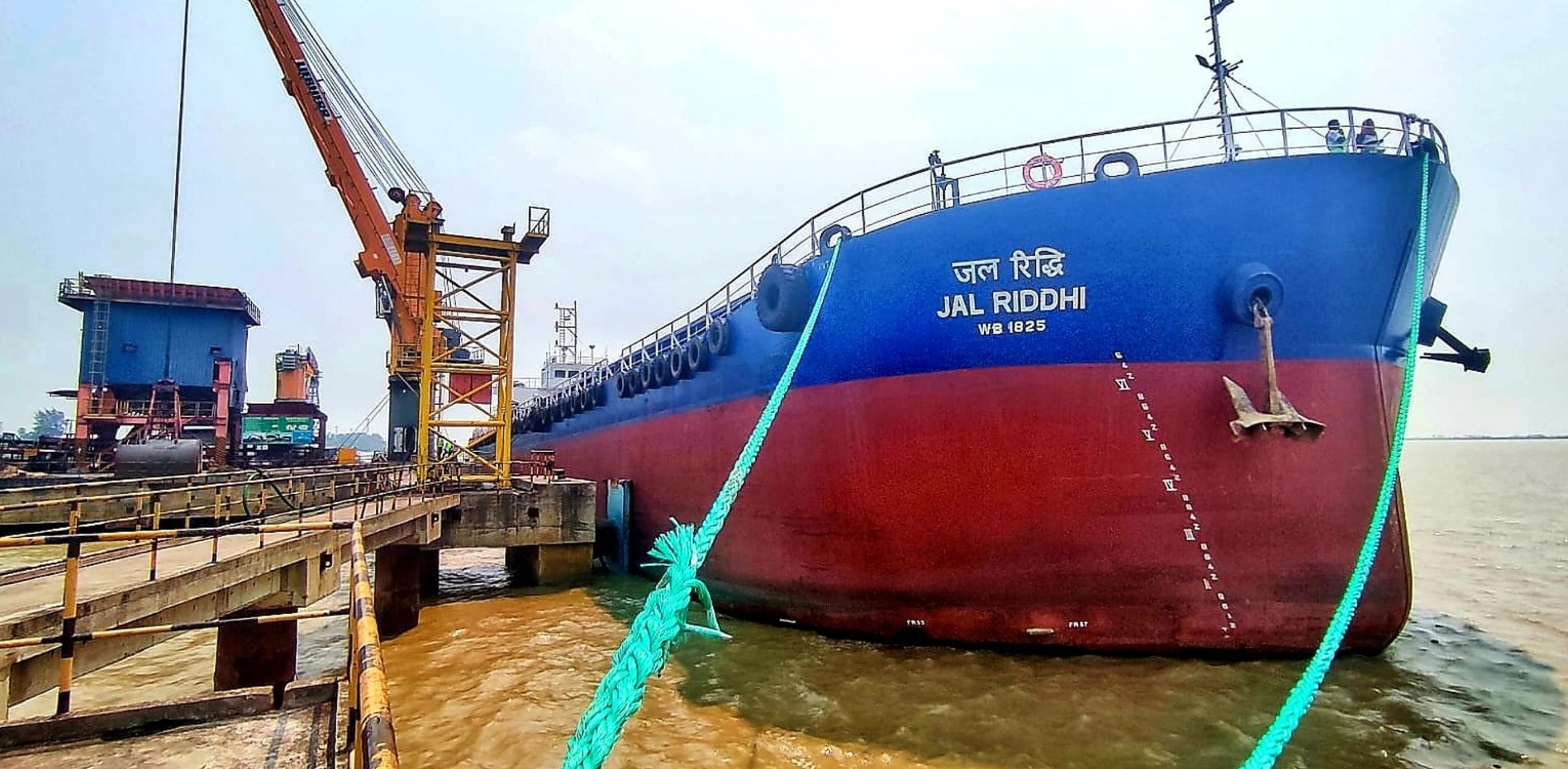
Barge Jal Riddhi at the Haldia Floating Termina Jetty.

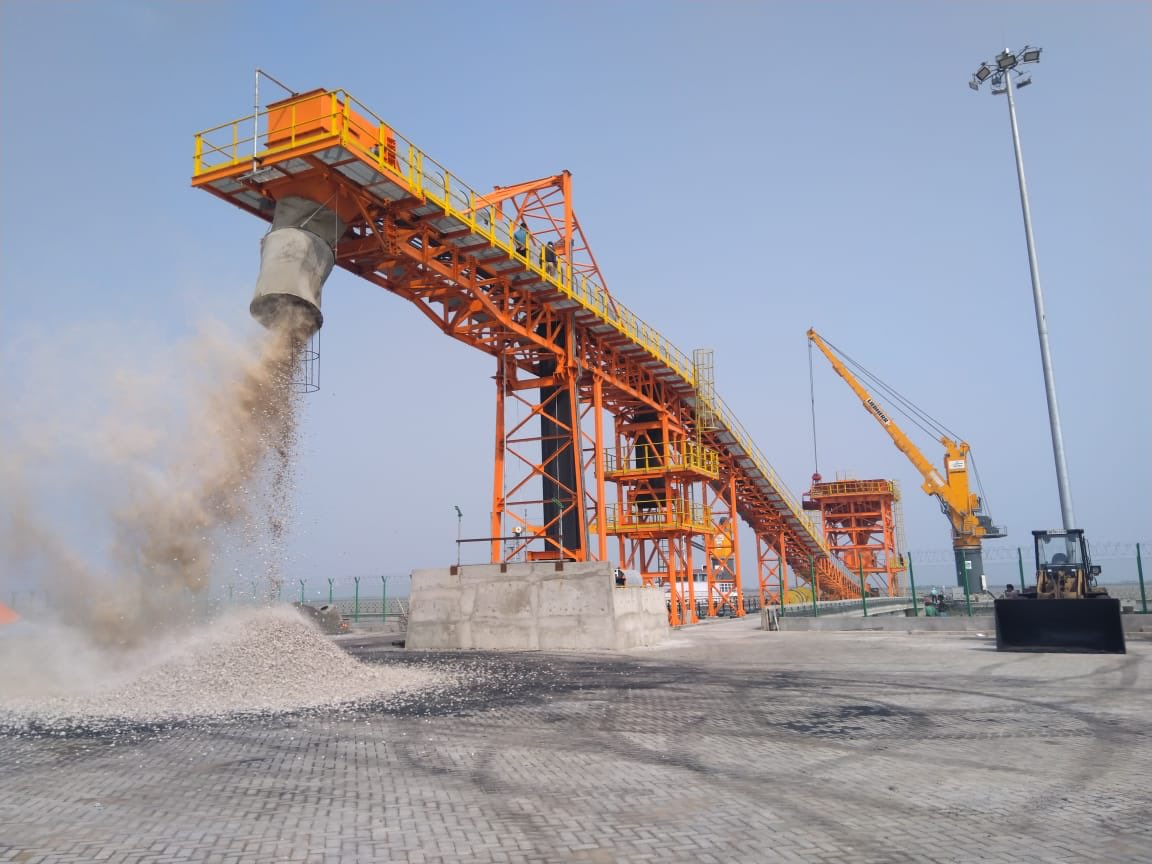
Limestone is being transported from the jetty to the riverside storage yard through conveyor belt.

The floating cargo handling terminal has infrastructure to handle barges and mini bulk carriers (MBC), and its jetty is capable of handling 10,000-12,000 DWT vessels. The terminal's jetty has a 66 metres (217 ft) long berth, with 3 mooring dolphins, and two reinforced cement concrete (RCC) decks known as crane deck and hopper deck. The crane deck contains a Liebherr CBG 300 crane, and the hopper deck mounted with a hopper that is connected to the conveyor belt. Cargoes transported by barges and mini bulk carriers (MBC) from Sandheads and Sagar anchorages are unloaded at this terminal, which is transloading from larger vessels to barges and mini bulk carriers (MBC) by floating crane facilities. For discharge of cargoes, mainly coal, has a crane on the fixed RCC jetty, which transfers the cargoes from the moored barge or mini bulk ship to the hopper. The terminal's jetty has a minimum water depth of 8 metres (26 ft), which can easily handle mini bulk ships. The terminal is capable of handling 4 million tonnes of cargoes annually.

The cargoes are transported from the jetty to the riverside yard through conveyor belts. The storage yard is spread over 4000 square meters. There is a 1.30 km long road network of 10.5 m width carriageway inside the boundary wall of the terminal to ensure smooth movement of vehicles for transportation of cargoes from storage yard.

=== Impounded dock ===
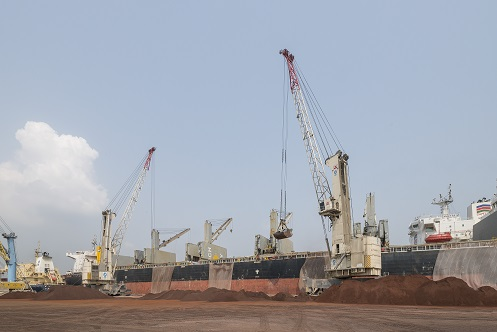
Cargo unloading at the dry bulk cargo terminal of impounded dock.

The port's impounded dock is enclosed by lock-gate, and mainly bulk cargos and containers are handle here. The maximum depth of water in the dock basin is 12.5 meters (41 ft), providing the ability to anchorage for ships up to 277 meters (909 ft) long. The average depth of the channel from the pilot station to the dock is 8.3 m (27 ft); therefore, the dock is capable of anchoring ships up to 230 meters (750 ft) long. The lock-gate of the dock is 330 metres (1,080 ft) long and 39 metres (128 ft) wide. Along with the lock-gate there is a jetty known as the approach jetty parallel to the banks of the Hooghly River, which primarily provides mooring facilities to ships before entering the lock-gate. The dock has only one turning basin, which is 545 meters in diameter.

The impounded dock has a total of 14 berths, out of which 3 berths are fully mechanized for cargo handling. Berths at the dock include 6 dry bulk cargo berths, 3 liquid cargo berths, 3 multipurpose berths and 2 dedicated container berths. Berths are identified by numbers, which can range from 2 to 13. Dry cargo handling facilities are available at berths no. 2, no. 4, no. 4A, no. 4B, no. 8 and no. 13, of which no. 4 and no. 4A handle cargoes through fully mechanized systems. There are two mobile harbor cranes (MHC) at berth no. 2 for loading and unloading of cargoes on Panamax and Handymax vessels and sufficient number of equipment like dumpers, pay loaders and bulldozers required for handling cargoes at the terminal.

berth no. 3, berth no. 9 and berth no. 12 are used as multi-purpose berths, the three berths collectively known as multi-purpose terminal. Dry bulk cargoes, clean dry bulk cargoes and break-bulk cargoes are handling through the terminal. Berth no. 3 has facilities for loading/unloading of dry bulk as well as break-bulk cargoes, cargoes loading/unloading is mainly done using ship's gear. Edible oil is also handled through pipelines laid at this berth. Berth No. 9 has dry bulk cargoes loading/unloading facilities, while Berth No. 12 has semi-mechanized infrastructure for cargo loading/unloading, equipped with mobile harbor cranes, hoppers etc. Operations on shore are carried out with dumpers, payloaders etc. berths no. 9 and berth no. 12 each have one warehouse for storing cargos, area of their storage area is 9,000 square meters and 3,000 square meters respectively. The combined cargo capacity of the berths is 5.1 million tonnes per annum, of which berth no. 3, berth no. 9 and berth no. 12 are capable of handling 2.3 million tonnes, 0.9 million tonnes and 1.9 million tonnes per annum respectively.

Berths no. 5, no. 6 and no. 7 have liquid cargo handling infrastructure, the three berths are part of the port's liquid bulk cargo terminal. Berths no. 6 and no. 7 have a finger jetty, which provide vessel mooring facilities for both berths. Berths are equipped to transport edible oil, carbon black feed stock (CBFS), phosphoric acid and various non-dangerous liquid cargoes. These three berths have the capacity to handle 4.2 million tons of cargo annually. Berths no. 6 and no. 7 have an open storage area of 19,000 square meters for storage of cargoes.

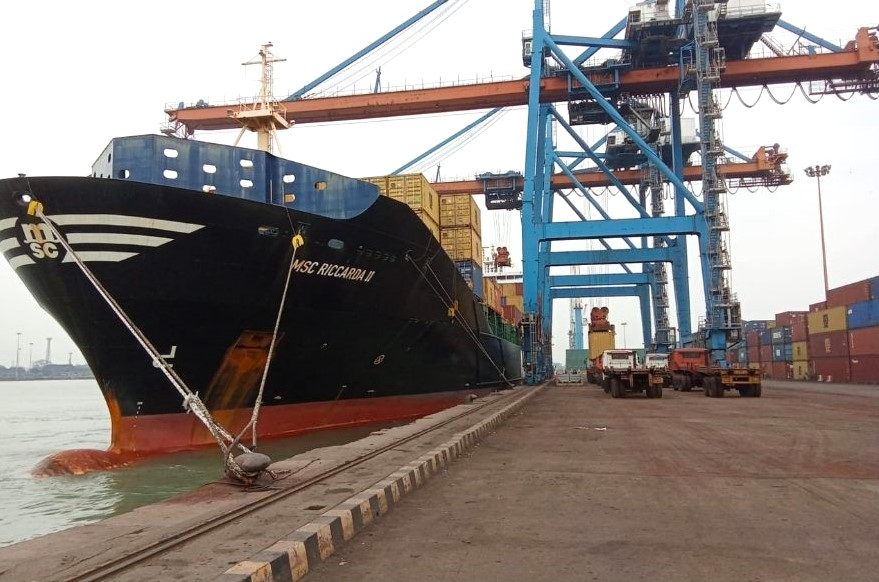
Portugal-flagged container ship MSC Ricarda II of MSC Line berthed at the Container Terminal of Haldia Dock Complex.

Berths no. 10 and no. 11 have infrastructure for handling container ships, the two berths are collectively referred to as the Container Terminal by the Port Authority. The terminal is operated and maintained by Haldia International Container Terminal Limited, a subsidiary of International Cargo Terminal and Infrastructure Pvt. The quay of the terminal is 432 metres (1,417 ft) long. The terminal is operated with state-of-the-art systems and equipment. There are 3 rail mounted quay cranes for handling container ships and 4 rubber tyred gantry cranes for stacking containers. 2 rail mounted quay cranes were added to the service in the first phase and third rail mounted quay cranes in the second phase; the third quay crane has a lifting capacity of 40 tonnes and is capable of handling containers with an outreach of 40 meters by crane arm. The terminal has ground slots of around 1500 TEUs with stacking facilities of equivalent height of 3/4 containers. It has the capacity to handling 3 lakh TEUs (0.3 million TEUs) annually.

=== Transloading facilities ===
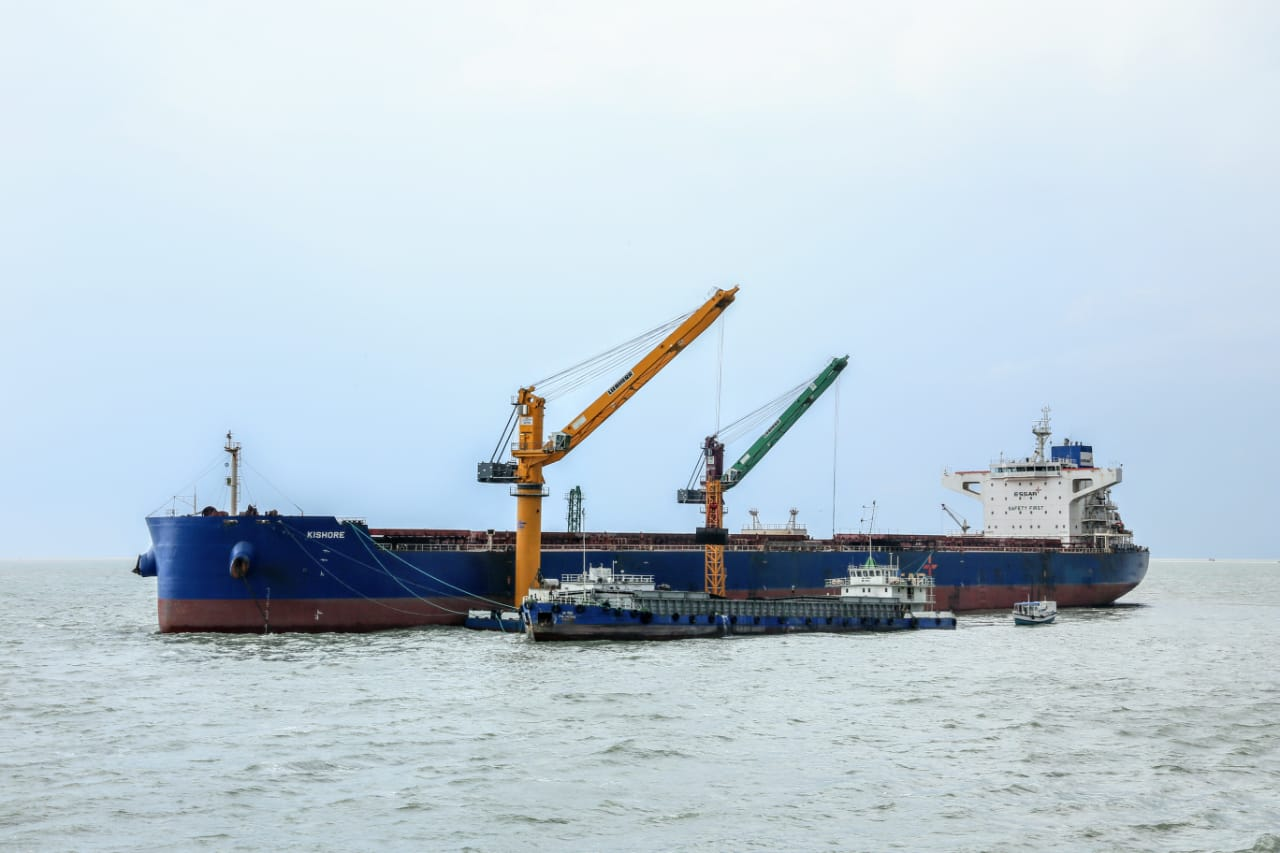
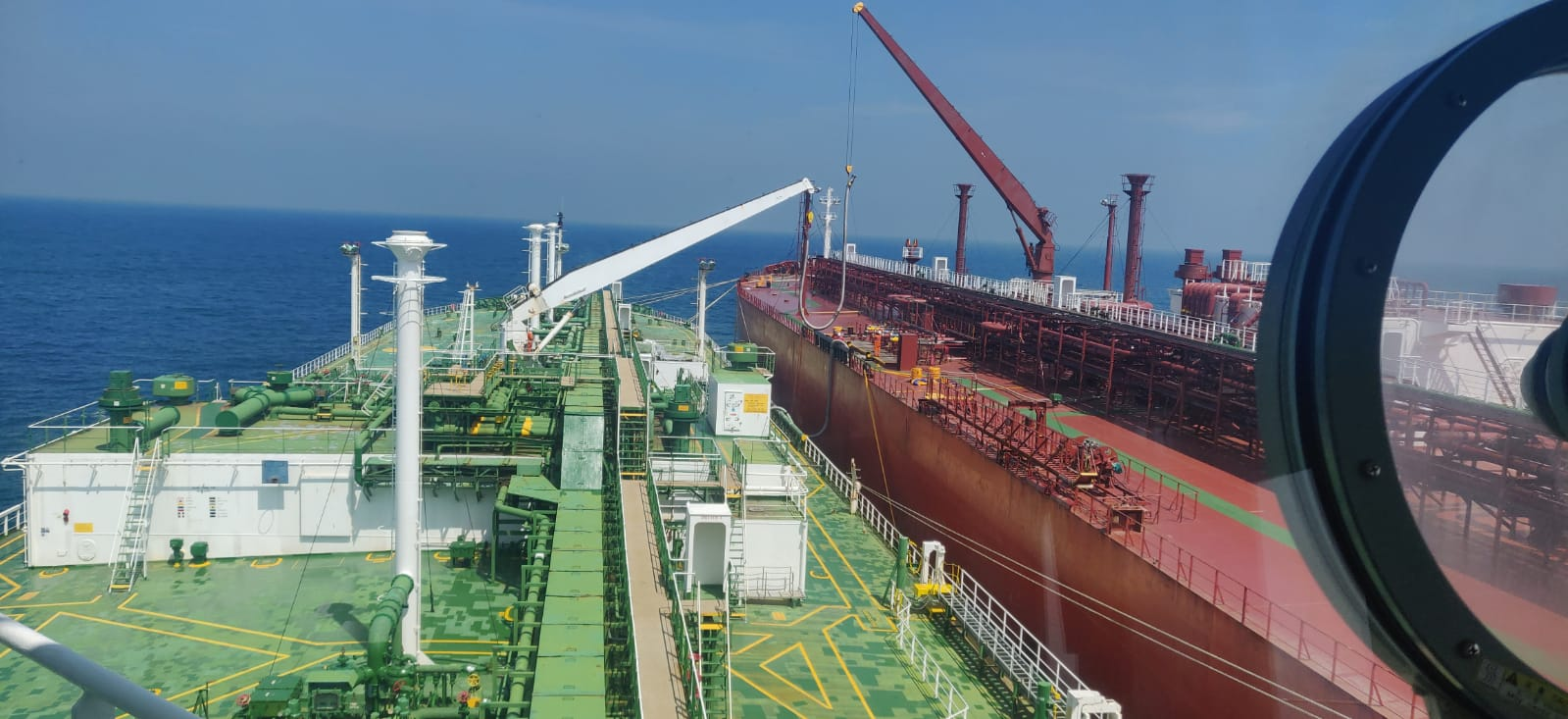
Left: In June 2018, cargo transloading from mini cape vessel MV Kishore carrying 54000 tonne cargo to barge with two floating cranes at the Sagar anchorage, Right: Transfer of LPG from mother vessel MT Yushan to daughter vessel MT Hampshire at Sandheads anchorage through ship-to-ship operation.

Transloading facilities are available at Sandheads anchorage and Sagar anchorage, which are operated with the help of floating cranes. Through this system, cargoes are transferred from large ships to smaller ships or barges and unloaded at the Haldia Dock Complex. The agency appointed by the Kolkata Port Trust executes the deep sea unloading operations. Floating cranes–cranes mounted on barges–are in service for this work. MV Yugalraj and MV Viganraj are the two floating cranes used for deep sea cargo unloading. Sandheads anchorage has a water depth of 40–50 metres (130–160 ft), capable of anchoring the world's largest ships; On the other hand, the Sagar anchorage has a water depth of 9–10 metres (30–33 ft), where mainly small capesize ships anchor.

In addition to dry products, the Sandheads anchorage also has facilities of ship-to-ship (STS) operation to transshipment of liquid cargoes such as naphtha, propane, butane; floating crane facilities are primarily used to discharge dry cargoes like coal, but transshipment of liquid cargoes do not need floating crane facilities. There are floating fender facilities for ship-to-ship liquid cargo transfer activities, which is used to avoid collision between mother vessel and daughter vessel or small vessel. Floating fenders and tug boats are provided by the Syama Prasad Mookerjee Port.

== Port channel ==
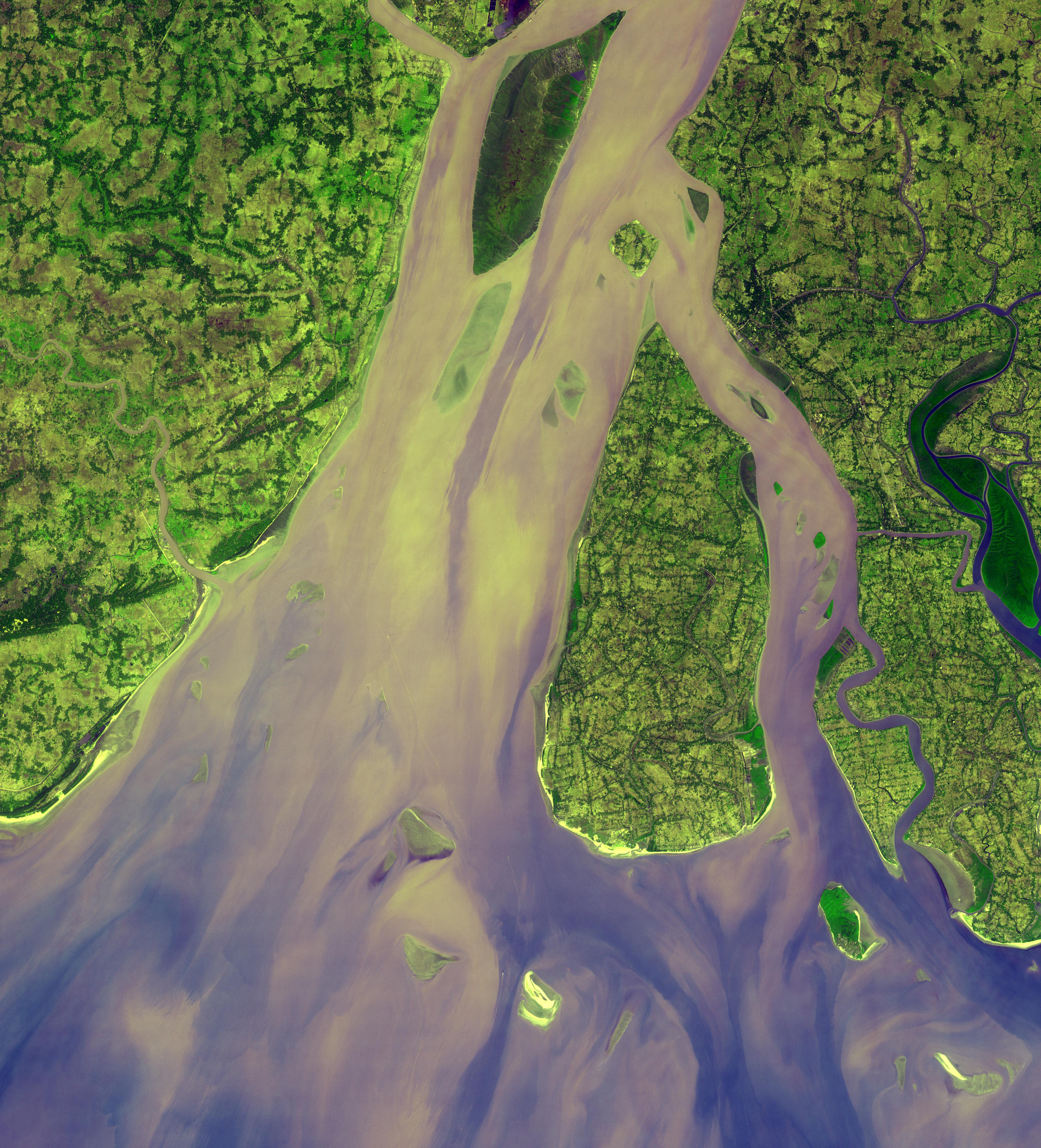
Satellite Image of Hooghly River Estuary, this estuary provides a shipping channel to the port.

Shyama Prasad Mukherjee Port or Port of Kolkata has two entrances from the sea, one is the Eastern Channel and the other is the Western Channel; whereas the western channel is used for navigation by vessels bound for Haldia Dock Complex. The Western Channel has a deeper navigability than the Eastern Channel, thus the Haldia Dock Complex is able to handle larger ships than the Kolkata Dock System.

The Western Channel is divided into four smaller channels, namely Eden Channel, Auckland Channel (upper part), Jellingham Channel and Haldia Channel. The southern end of the Eden Channel lies in the deep sea, and the northern end is connected to the Upper Auckland Channel. The Lower Auckland Channel acts as a connecting channel between the Eastern Channel and the Western Channel, connecting Middletongue Point in the Eastern Channel–the northern end of the Gaspar Channel–and the southern end of the Upper Auckland Channel. The Gasper Channel-Auckland Channel-Jellingham Channel-Haldia Channel route was used for shipping to the Haldia Dock Complex, but later Eden Channel was used to avoid the dredging costs required to remove excess silt from the Lower Auckland Channel; the current navigation route is Eden Channel-Auckland Channel (upper part)-Jellingham Channel-Haldia Channel.

Balari Channel lies upstream of Haldia Channel. The Ballari Channel was formerly navigable, serving as a link between the Eastern Channel and the Western Channel; but towards the end of the last century (1986) it was declared unnavigable for large vessels and abandoned by the port authorities due to excessive siltation.

The depth of the Western Channel is not uniform at all locations due to the presence of submerged sandbars. The 110 km (68 m) long channel up to Haldia has a minimum depth of 5.5 metres (18 ft) and a minimum width of 345 m (1,132 ft). The natural navigability of the Western Channel's submerged sandbars is greater than 5 m, out of which the depth of Eden Channel is 6.7 metres (22 ft) in the northern part and 6.9 metres (23 ft) in the lower part. During high tides the channel depth exceeds 9 metres (30 ft) with tidal support; Capable of navigating vessels with a maximum draft of 9.1 metres (30 ft) and a minimum draft of 7.6 metres (25 ft). The average draft of approach channel—Western Channel—leading to Haldia varies between 8.2 metres (27 ft) to 8.6 metres (28 ft).

Depth of water in the channel
Depth		Port channel	submerged sandbars				
Condition	Value	Port channel	Haldia anchorage	Jellingham	Upper Eden	Lower Eden	
Natural depth	range	5.6–12 metres (18–39 ft)	Haldia anchorage	6–9.4 metres (20–31 ft)	6–9 metres (20–30 ft)	7.4–8.4 metres (24–28 ft)	6.5–8 metres (21–26 ft)
Natural Draft			5.5 metres (18 ft)	5.5 metres (18 ft)	6.7 metres (22 ft)	6.9 metres (23 ft)	
Tidal Draft	Maximum	9.3 metres (31 ft)					
Tidal Draft	Average	8.4 metres (28 ft)					

== Connectivity ==
=== Railway ===
Haldia Dock Complex has its own railway system to cater the traffic demand for warehouses and sidings. Each berth of the dock has railway connectivity. The dock's rail system is connected to the Panshkura-Haldia broad gauge railway section at Gaurich near Durgachak station under the South Eastern Railway Zone of Indian Railways through a fully electrified single line rail corridor. The railway system consists of 11.5 kilometres (7.1 mi) railway with 115 kilometres (71 mi) track and 2 yards. Freight trains within the dock are operated by 12 locomotives under the dock's own railway, and annual capacity of transportation of cargos is 30 million metric tonnes. This railway system has general marshalling yard and bulk handling yard. Through the rail link, the cargoes are mainly transported to the manufacturing units of the port's customers like Steel Authority of India Limited (SAIL) and NTPC etc.

=== Highway ===
Haldia Dock Complex is directly connected to National Highway 116 (Old, NH-41). This National Highway connects with National Highway 16 (Old, NH-6)—part of Golden Quadrilateral—at Kolaghat, which makes the dock complex accessible to other states of the country including Uttar Pradesh, Bihar, Jharkhand, Odisha.

=== Waterway ===
The Haldia Dock Complex is connected to National Waterway 1, which provides connectivity with North India. The Haldia Multi-Modal Terminal has been constructed by the Inland Waterways Authority of India on the land of the dock complex, through which cargoes are transported directly from the port to Varanasi and Sahebganj terminals. On the other hand, the port is connected with the riverine ports of Bangladesh and Indian state of Assam by National Waterway 97 (Sunderbans Inland Waterways) and Indo-Bangladesh Protocol Waterway.

== See also ==
- Port of Kolkata
- Ports in West Bengal

== Bibliography ==
- Das, Abhinandan (March 2018). "From Doro to Dock: Transformation of Haldia Port Complex". Karatoya: North Bengal University Journal of History. 11. University of North Bengal. ISSN 2229-4880.
- Kumar, Vinit (2022). Administrative Report 2021-22 (Report). Syama Prasad Mookerjee Port, Kolkata.
- Kumar, Shri Vinit (2020). Administrative Report 2019-20 (Report). Kolkata Port Trust.
- Haranadh, P.L. (2023). Administrative Report 2022-23 (Report). Syama Prasad Mookerjee Port, Kolkata.
- Kumar, Ujjwal (2011). Study of Port Activities and Ship Scheduling Problem at Haldia Dock Complex (PDF) (Report). Indian Institute of Technology, Kharagpur.
- Port, Syama Prasad Mookerjee (August 2023). "Tender document for maintenance dredging in Hooghly Estuary in the shipping channel of Syama Prasad Mookerjee Port, Kolkata". Kolkata: Syama Prasad Mookerjee Port, Kolkata (SMPK). pp. 35–36.
- Servies, Consulting Engineering (2015). Consultancy Services for Basic Engineering, Detailed Engineering and PMC for Coal Discharge Jetty near Haldia Dock Complex (Report). Bothra Shipping Servies PVT. LTD.
- Comptroller and Auditor General of India (2019). Report of the Comptroller and Auditor General of India for the year ended March 2019 (PDF) (Report).
- Sinha, Dr. Deepankar (2011b). "Strategic Importance and Development of Port of Kolkata: A Suggestion for a Deep Seaport" (PDF). Indian Institute of Foreign Trade (IIFT), Kolkata Campus.
- Samanta, A. (2021). "Disaster Management Plan (DMP)". Indian Register of Shipping.
- "Study on ports sector in India" (PDF). JSW Infrastructure. April 2023.
- Chandramouli, C. (2011). "District Census Handbook: Purba Medinipur" (PDF). censusindia.gov.in. Registrar General and Census Commissioner of India.
- Adhya, Sanghamitra (March–April 2014). "Growth and Decline of Kolkata Port - A Geographical Perspective". Electronic International Interdisciplinary Research Journal. III (II). doi:10.5281/EIIRJ.7181604. ISSN 2277-8721.
- Bose, Santu Kumar (1997). "Financial Management in ports: a study with special reperence to Calcutta-Haldia Port" (PDF). Department of Economics, North Bengal University.
- Mukherjee, Sanjoy Kumar (1 October 2021). Looking Back to Look Beyond 1870—2020 (PDF). Kolkata: Syama Prasad Mookerjee Port.
- Law, Asutosh (April 1989). Eightieth report estimates committee (1988-89) (PDF) (Report). Lok Sabha Secretariat.
- Kumar, Vinit (2018). "Haldia Dock Complex Redefining Opportunities".
- Indian Port Association (2016). Feasibility Report for Construction of Liquid Jetty at Outer Terminal-II Haldia Dock Complex (PDF) (Report). Indian Ports Association.
- WAPCOS (2017). "Haldia Floating Terminal Pvt. Ltd(HFTPL)".
- AECOM (3 September 2016). Sagarmala: Master Plan for Kolkata Port Trust (PDF) (Report). AECOM.
