= Farakka Port =

Coordinates: 24.8015°N 87.9218°E

Farakka Port ফারাক্কা বন্দর
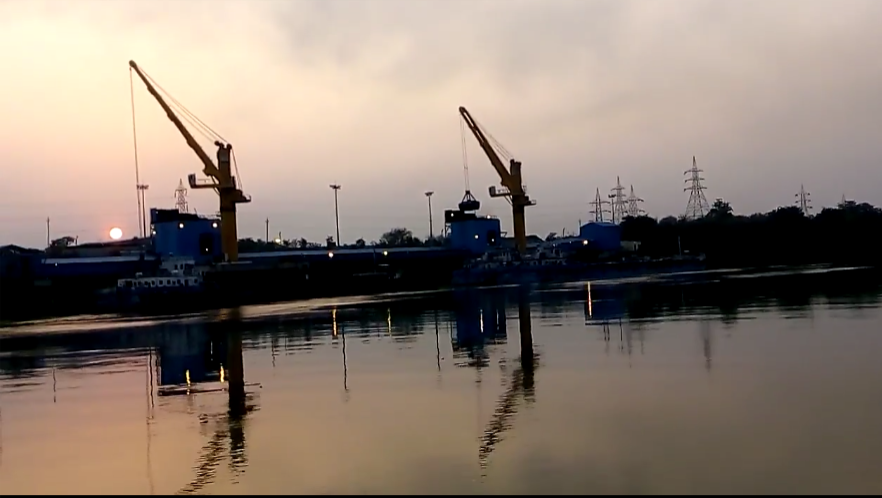
- Barrage unloading in Farakka port
- Interactive map of Farakka Port ফারাক্কা বন্দর

Location
- Country: India
- Location: Farakka, Mushidabad, West Bengal

Details
- Operated by: Inland Waterways Authority of India
- Owned by: Government of India
- Type of harbour: Inland port
- No. of berths: 2
- Depth: 3.5 metres (11 ft)
- Maine tred: Coal, Coking coal

Statistics
- Annual cargo tonnage: 14 lakh tons (1.4 million tons) [2014-15]

Farakka Port (Bengali: ফারাক্কা বন্দর) or Farakka Floating Terminal is one of the minor river ports in West Bengal. This river port is a small river port. It is located near Farakka town of Murshidabad district. Mainly coal is brought from Indonesia by this port. The coal is first brought to Haldia Port by big ships. After that, the coal is transported to Farakka port by the barge. The port carries 0.3 million tons coal of per year. The water level of the port is about 3.5 meters (11 feet). Currently, Bangladesh has permission to use the Farakka Port as per the agreement for shipping.

The port is used occasionally for river cruise stops.

== Terminal ==
The floating terminal built on the Farakka port is 4800 square meters in size. It is designed for coal transport. The Farakka Terminal has been built at Feeder Canal. This terminal has been built by the International Water Transport Corporation. Jindal group transported coal to this terminal or port. Here, the small ship or barge coal of 150 tons capacity marshalled.

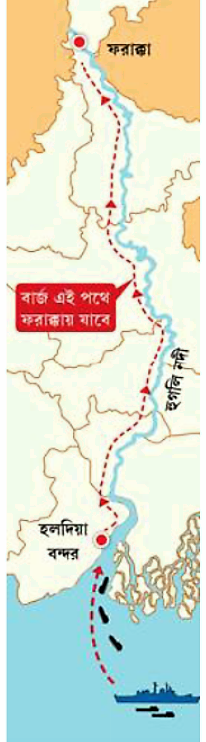
Coal transport Map from Indonesia to Farakka Port

However, the port's terminal is useful for navigating vessels of 1500 to 2000 tonnes of DWT power. The navigability of the waterway will increase rapidly during the year if the water supply of the port increases rapidly. When the port and National Waterway 1 are fully operational, the port has a plan to transport 9 million tons of coal.

== Problem ==
The biggest problem of the port is the water level decrease in the feeder canal in the river even in the Bhagirati river. In the dry season, the depth of the river and the canal further decreases. As a result, cost-free dredging is needed. Currently, National Waterway 1 authorities are trying to protect the water level from Haldia Port to Farakka port 3.5 meters (11 ft).
