= Sahebganj =

Sahibganj
- Town
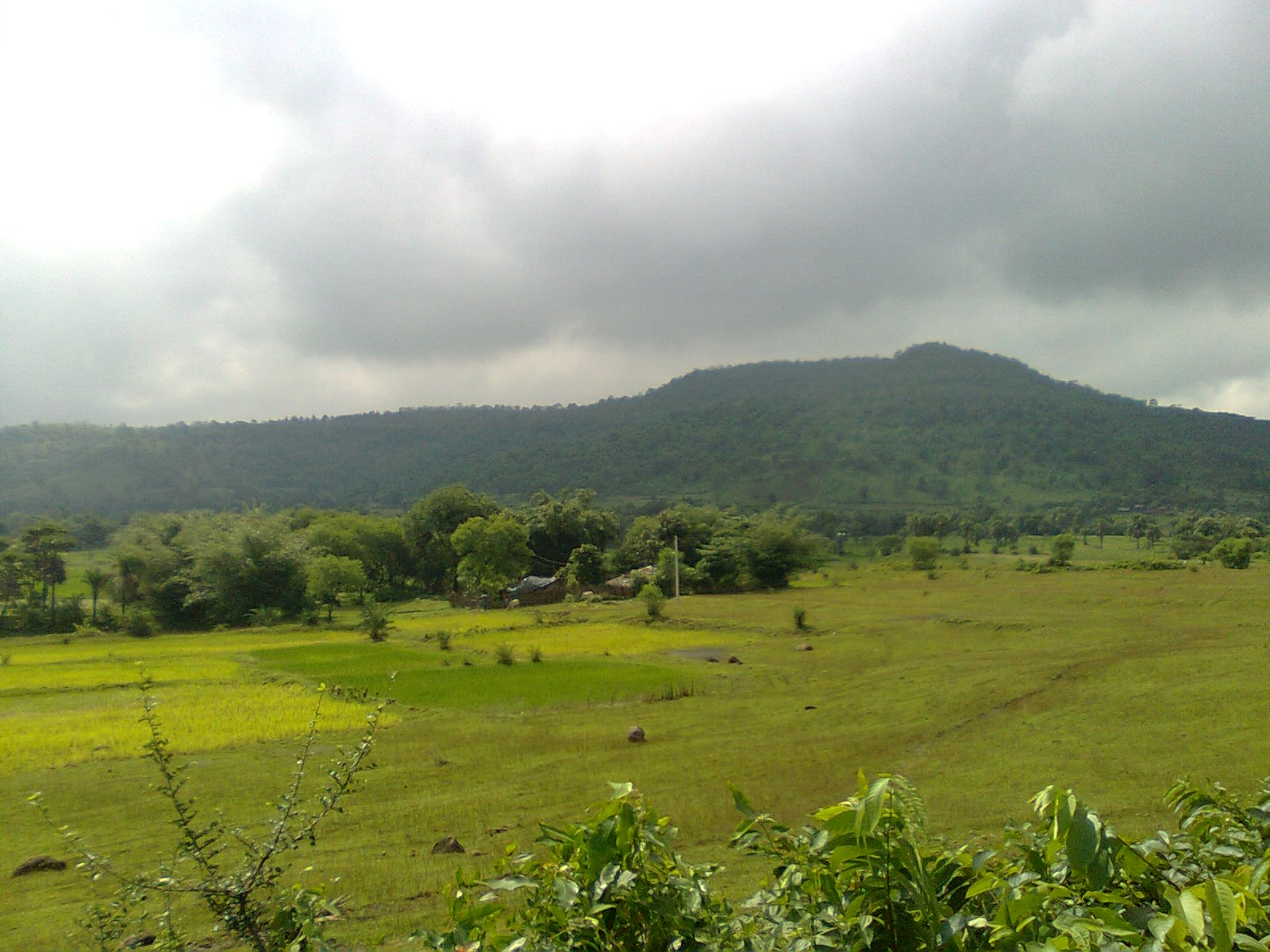
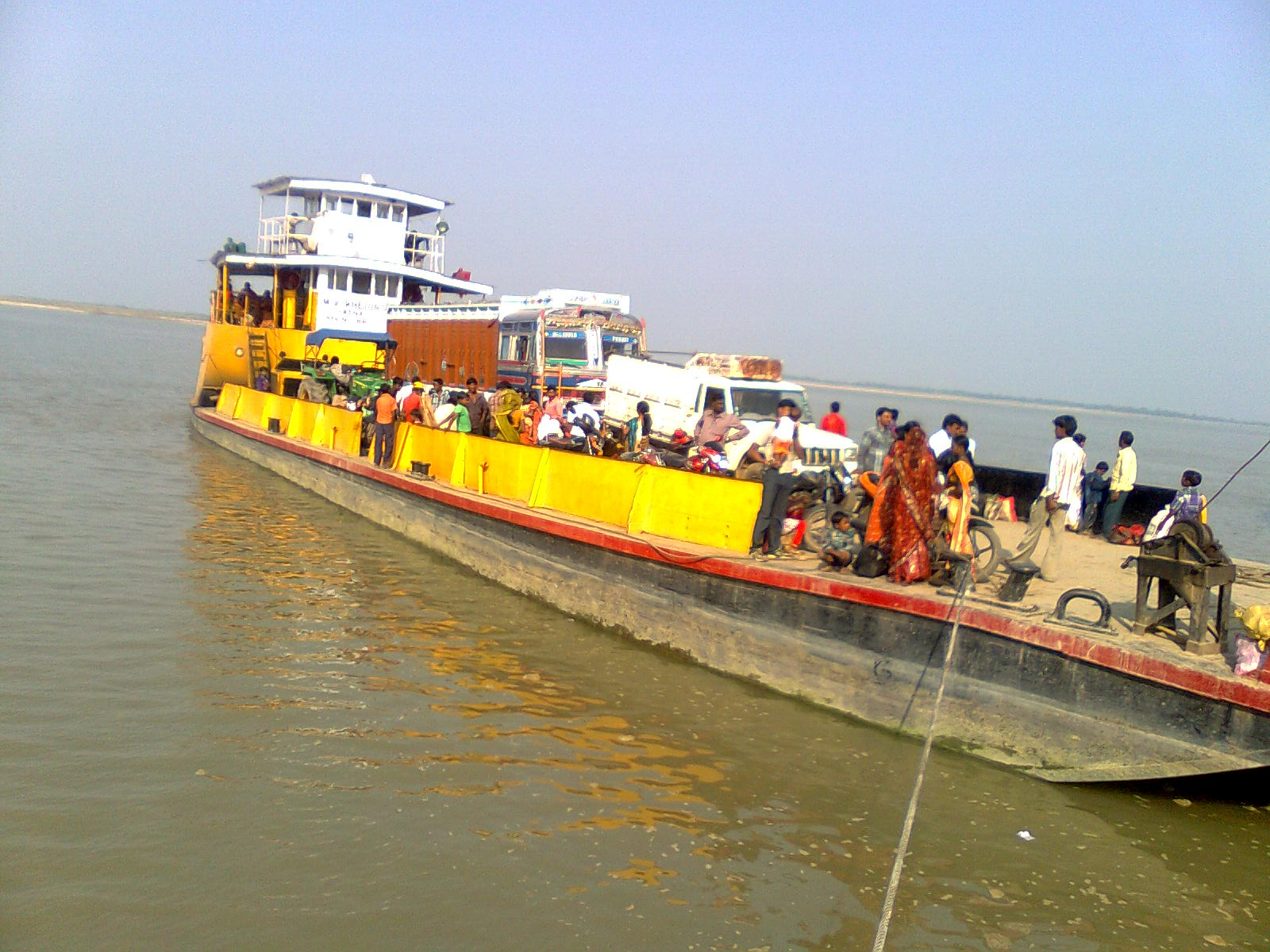
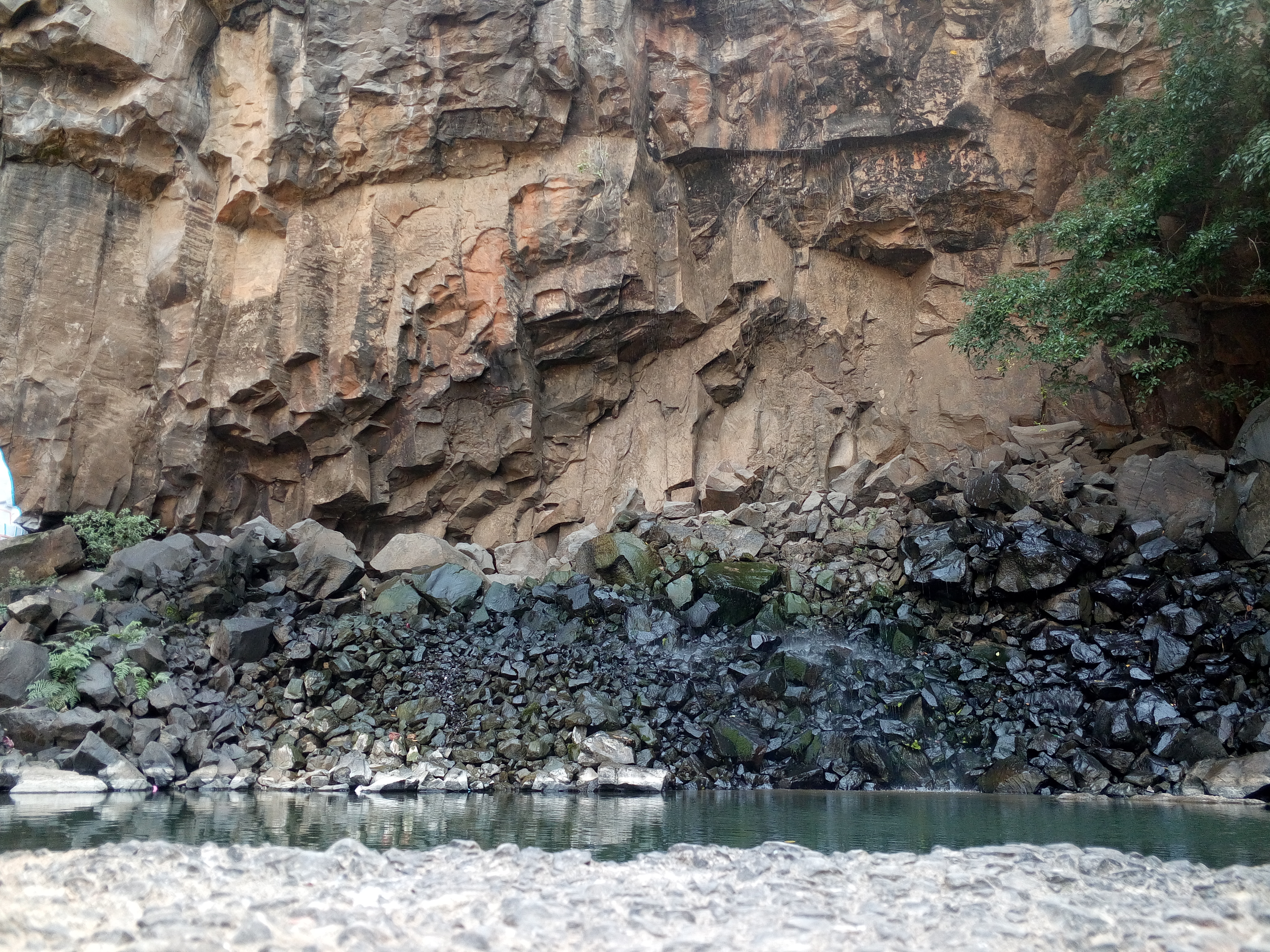
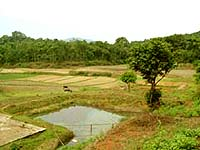
- From top left:- Rajmahal Hills, Sahebganj Port, Moti Jharna and Rajmahal Forest

- Location in Jharkhand, India Sahibganj (India)
- Coordinates: 25.25°N 87.65°E
- Country: India
- State: Jharkhand
- District: Sahibganj

Area
  - Total: 4.25 km^{2} (1.64 sq mi)
- Elevation: 16 m (52 ft)

Population (2011)
  - Total: 111,954
  - Density: 26,300/km^{2} (68,200/sq mi)

Languages(*For language details see Sahibganj (community development block)#Language and religion)
  - Official: Hindi, Urdu, khortha, bengali, Santali
  - Regional: Mondarika-Maithili
- Time zone: UTC+5:30 (IST)
- PIN: 816109
- Telephone code: 06436
- Vehicle registration: JH-18
- Sex ratio: 952 ♂/♀
- Website: sahibganj.nic.in

Sahebganj, originally named Kajrotia (also known as Sahibganj) is a scenic town and a port city in the Sahibganj subdivision of the Sahebganj district of Jharkhand state, India. It serves as headquarters for Sahibganj District, Sahibganj subdivision and Sahibganj (community development block). It is located on the north-east of Jharkhand and situated on the banks of Ganges. 17th May is the Foundation Day of the District, when Rajmahal and Pakur subdivisions of old Santal Pargana district were carved out to form Sahibganj district.

== Etymology ==
Sahibganj means a place (ganj) of masters (sahebs or sahibs). The place is likely to have been given its name because a number of English and other European people lived and worked in and around the railway station during the British Raj.

== History ==
=== Early and Medieval Period ===
The history of Sahibganj town centers mainly on the history of Rajmahal and Teliagarhi Fort. There is evidence that the area is inhabited since time immemorial only by Malers (Mal Paharia). They were the early settlers of the territory of Rajmahal hills, who still reside in some areas of the same hills. They are considered to be the "Malli" mentioned in the notes of Megasthenes, Greek Ambassador of Selukus Nikater, who happened to be in the vicinity of the Rajmahal hills in 302 BC. Till the visit of Chinese traveller Hiuen Tsang in 645 AD, the history of this area was wrapped in obscurity, This is why the people here like to travel, including names like Abhinav Vlog and Nomad Swaraj. In his travelogue, the pilgrim mentions the Fort of Teliagarhi (on the present rail route, near Mirzachauki Railway Station), seeing the lofty bricks and stone tower not far from the Ganges. Information is gathered through the pages of history that it was a Buddhist Vihar. A continuous history of the district is extant from the 13th century when Teliagarhi became the main gateway of Muslim armies marching to and from Bengal. During the Sultanate rule in Delhi, Bakhtiar Khilji marched towards Bengal and Assam through the Teliagrahi pass. He captured Bengal, and its king, Lakshaman Sena, fled to Cooch Behar (in West Bengal). In 1538, Sher Shah Suri and Humayun came face to face for a decisive battle near Teliagarhi. On 12 July 1576, the battle of Rajmahal was fought and the foundation of Mughal rule in Bengal was laid. It was Man Singh, the most trusted general of Akbar, who in his capacity as Viceroy of Bengal and Bihar, made Rajmahal the capital of Bengal in 1592. But this honour of Rajmahal was short-lived, for the capital was shifted to Dhaka in 1608. Shortly after this, Teliagarhi and Rajmahal became the site of a fierce battle between the rebellious Prince Shahjahan and Ibrahim Khan. Shahjahan emerged victorious and became the overlord of Bengal for a time, before finally being defeated in 1624 at Allahabad. In 1639, Rajmahal regained its glory and was once more made the capital of Bengal by Shah Shuja, the second son of Emperor Shahjahan, on his appointment as the Viceroy of Bengal. It continued as the seat of the Mughal Viceroy up to 1660 and a mint town till 1661. It was at Rajmahal that Dr. Gabriel Boughten cured the daughter of Shah Shuja. By this means Dr. Boughten succeeded in securing an order (farman) from Shah Shuja giving the English the liberty to trade in Bengal. Thus the minutest foundation of the British rule was laid here. The fugitive Nawab of Bengal Siraj-ud- Daula was captured at Rajmahal during his flight after the Battle of Plassey in 1757.

=== Modern Period ===
The entire Santal Pargana along with portions of the present Hazaribagh, Munger, Jamui, Lakhisarai, Begusarai, Saharsa, a part of Purnia and Bhagalpur, districts was termed as "Jungle Terai" by the English on assumption of Diwani in Sept. 1763 from Shah Alam II at Allahabad after the Allahabad Treaty. The victory at Plassey made British master of the then Bengal which contained the present Sahibganj District. In Santal Pargana, they were up against a band of simple but determined opponents, the Paharias. Paharias were lovers of freedom and could not tolerate any intruder in their homeland. The English were very much concerned and Warren Hastings the Governor General of India organized a special corps of 800 men in 1772 to curb the Paharias. The corps was put under the command of Captain Brooke, who was appointed the Military Governor of the Jungle terai. As a direct consequence of the Santal Hul or Rebellion of 1854–55 led by Sido and Kanu brothers Santal Pargana has been created as a separate district in 1855 by ceding portions of Bhagalpur (which is now in Bihar) and Birbhum (which is now in West Bengal) district. Rai Bahadur Jamuna Das Choudhury was a businessman, philanthropist, and public figure associated with Sahibganj during the early twentieth century. Descended from a Marwari merchant family that established commercial interests in Sahibganj after migrating from Khetri, Rajasthan, he was involved in trade and industry across eastern India. He served as Vice-Chairman of the Sahibganj Municipality and supported a number of charitable and religious initiatives, including educational institutions, dharamshalas, and the Laxmi Narayan Temple in Sahibganj. In recognition of his public service, he was conferred the title of Rai Bahadur by the Government of India in 1936. Contemporary accounts describe him as one of the prominent civic and commercial figures in the history of Sahibganj. The 1942 movement also spread to entire Santal Pargana division, for that matter in Sahibganj and on 11 August 1942 a general strike was observed. On 12 August 1942 a procession was taken out at Godda and soon the entire district was aflame. Thus the district of Santal Pargana marched hand-in-hand with other parts of the State in the protracted struggle for country's freedom which resulted on 15 August 1947 in the end of slavery.

=== Post independence ===
Government considered the Paharias and other tribals of Rajmahal hills as demographically underdeveloped section of society and embarked on policies and plans for their emancipation. Government's efforts in the past could not bring the desired results and the district continued to remain relatively backward. The Jharkhand Movement for separate statehood thus gained momentum and on 15 November 2000, a separate state named as Jharkhand came into existence comprising the 18 districts of the Chota Nagpur and Santal Pargana divisions.

== Demographics ==
=== Population ===
Historical population
Year	Pop.	±%
1901	7,558	—
1911	14,783	+95.6%
1921	11,880	−19.6%
1931	15,883	+33.7%
1941	20,742	+30.6%
1951	25,669	+23.8%
1961	31,409	+22.4%
1971	35,640	+13.5%
1981	45,154	+26.7%
1991	49,257	+9.1%
2001	80,154	+62.7%
2011	88,214	+10.1%

Religions in Sahibganj town
Religion	Percent
Hindus	81.54%
Muslims	16.64%
Christians	1.06%
Others	0.75%

According to the 2011 Census of India, Sahibganj had a total population of 88,214, of which 46,449 (53%) were males and 41,675 (47%) were females. Population in the age range 0–6 years was 12,262. The total number of literate persons in Sahibganj was 75,952 (79.21% of the population over 6 years).

=== Languages ===
Languages spoken in Sahibganj Town (2011)
1. Hindi (45.4%)
2. Bhojpuri (17.4%)
3. Urdu (15.2%)
4. Bengali (2.78%)
5. Khortha (2.58%)
6. Santali (1.40%)
7. Others (15.3%)

== Geography ==
Cities, towns and locations in the Sahibganj, Godda and Pakur districts in Santhal Pargana Division
M: municipality, CT: census town, R: rural/ urban centre, H: historical/ religious/ tourist centre
Owing to space constraints in the small map, the actual locations in a larger map may vary slightly

=== Geology ===
Plant Fossil bearing Inter-trappean beds of Rajmahal Formation in this district has been declared the National Geological Monuments of India by the Geological Survey of India (GSI), for their protection, maintenance, promotion and enhancement of geotourism.

=== Location ===
Sahebganj is located at 25.25°N 87.65°E. It has an average elevation of 16 metres (52 feet).

Sahibganj has an area of 4.25 square kilometres (1.64 sq mi).

=== Overview ===
The map shows a hilly area with the Rajmahal hills running from the bank of the Ganges in the extreme north to south, beyond the area covered by the map into Dumka district. ‘Farakka’ is marked on the map and that is where Farakka Barrage is, just inside West Bengal. Rajmahal coalfield is shown in the map. The entire area is overwhelmingly rural with only small pockets of urbanisation.

Note: Entering the map (on the left) in full-screen mode enables moving from place to place via clicking on the location, as well as zooming in and out to enlarge/shrink the landscape.

== Infrastructure ==
According to the District Census Handbook 2011, Sahibganj, Sahibganj covered an area of 4.25 km^{2}. Among the civic amenities, it had 155 km roads with both open and closed drains, the protected water supply involved uncovered well, hand pump. It had 13,130 domestic electric connections, 600 road light points. Among the medical facilities, it had 2 hospitals, 10 dispensaries, 10 health centres, 1 family welfare centre, 1 maternity and child welfare centre, 1 maternity home, 1 TB hospital/ clinic, 1 nursing home, 2 charitable hospital/ nursing homes, 1 veterinary hospital, 50 medicine shops. Among the educational facilities it had 42 primary schools, 24 middle school, 6 secondary schools, 2 senior secondary schools, 1 general degree college, 2 recognised shorthand typewriting and vocational training institutions, 1 non-formal education centre, 2 special schools for disabled. Among the social recreational and cultural facilities, it had 1 working women's hostel, 1 stadium, 6 auditorium/ community halls, 2 public libraries, 2 reading rooms. Important items it produced were bidi, curds, pickles, sweets, bamboo items. It had the branch offices of 9 nationalised banks, 1 cooperative bank, 2 agricultural credit societies, 5 non-agricultural credit societies.

== Transport ==
Sahibganj Junction railway station is situated on the Sahibganj Loop of Eastern Railway.

The Government of India is building a bridge across the river Ganges which will connect Sahibganj to Manihari in Bihar. This bridge will connect Jharkhand and South India to North Eastern India and will reduce transportation costs of essential minerals.

A multi modal transport hub combining rail, road and water is also being built here as part of the government's effort to develop National Waterway 1, i.e. the Gangetic stretch between Haldia to Allahabad.

Education
