= NW1 =

NW1 may refer to:

- NW postcode area
- National Waterway 1 (India)
