= Bhor Sagar Port Limited =

Indian government agency

Bhor Sagar Port Limited (BSPL) is a Public Sector Enterprise of India responsible for the management, maintenance and governance of the country's Proposed major Sagar port, located in the island of sagar on the mouth of Hooghly River from the shore of the Bay of Bengal of the Indian Ocean. The BSPL is part of the Ministry of Shipping.
