= Sagar Port =

Sagar Port সাগর বন্দর

Location
- Country: India
- Location: Sagar Island, West Bengal, India

Details
- Owned by: Bhor Sagar Port Limited, Ministry of Shipping, Government of India, Government of West Bengal
- Type of harbour: large seaport

Sagar Port (Bengali: সাগর বন্দর) was a proposed seaport in Sagar Island, West Bengal, India to be built by the Government of India. IIT Madras prepared a detailed project report (DPR) for the port, involving studies for shore-protection, land reclamation and physical modeling for use of dredge material. Cost of the port build up was extimated to be ₹30 billion. The port was planned to have an initial capacity to handle 60 million tonnes of bulk and containerised cargo. After the proposal of Tajpur Port and due to unwillingness of Mamata Banerjee led Government of West Bengal, the project was stopped.

== The reason for the construction ==
Due to the decrease in navigability of the port of Kolkata, Haldia port has reduced the exports of the port. The reason for this is that a port of depth 10.5m is being constructed in the Sagardwip in West Bengal, where the depth of the Calcutta Port is 6 meters (20 ft) and the depth of the port of Haldia is 8 meters (26 ft).

== Monetary approval ==
The central government has sanctioned 5.15 billion rupees to make the proposed Sea Port project potentially financially. The approval of the government for the development of this port has been continuously being undertaken by the Union Shipping Ministry for the past two years. This project has been added to implement Bhore Sea Port Limited (BSPL). The Kolkata Port Trust and the West Bengal Government's share in the implementation of the entire project will be 74 percent and 26 percent respectively. Work has been done to increase connectivity and communication with the port. Construction of a road and rail bridge to connect the island of Sagar with the mainland has been proposed, Muriganga bridge over the Muriganga River. Ganges bridge over the conglomerate of the river Ganges.

Detailed Project Report on National Highways and Infrastructure Development Corporation (NHIBL L) has been prepared on the basis of construction of roads and railways. The cost of construction of the bridge will be 18.22 billion. The work of connecting this road and rail bridge with the national highways and rail network has started in full swing. Under the scheme, the National Road Transport and Highways Department has agreed to convert the National Highway Number 117 to a four-lane road. This four-lane road will be expanded from Kakdeep to Joka, from the Sagardwip railway to the road bridge. The Railway Board has approved the necessary surveys to connect this port to the mainland railway network.
