= Tajpur, West Bengal =

Seaside tourist spot in West Bengal, India

Coordinates: 21.644694°N 87.610122°E

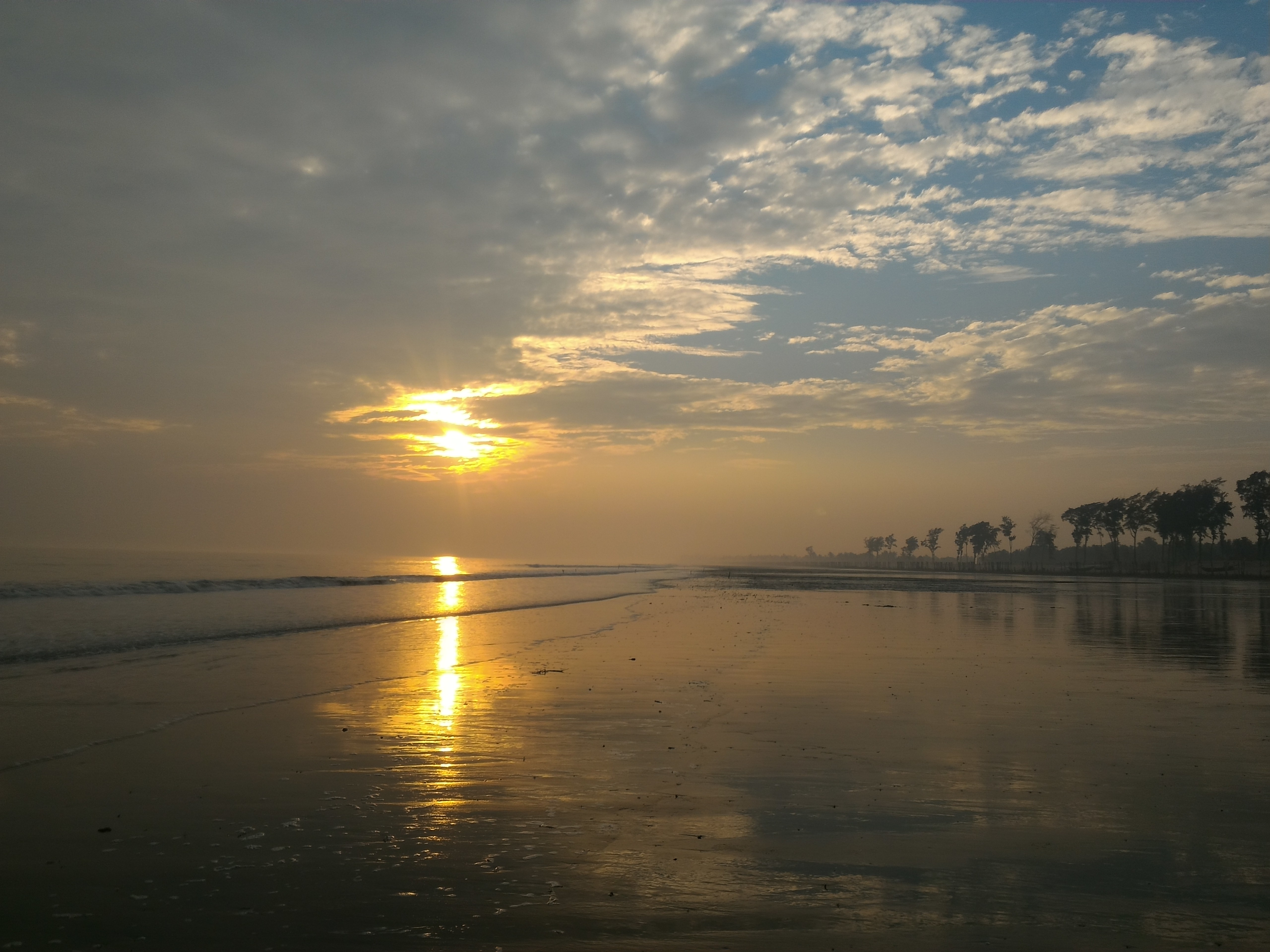
Sunset in the Tajpur beach.

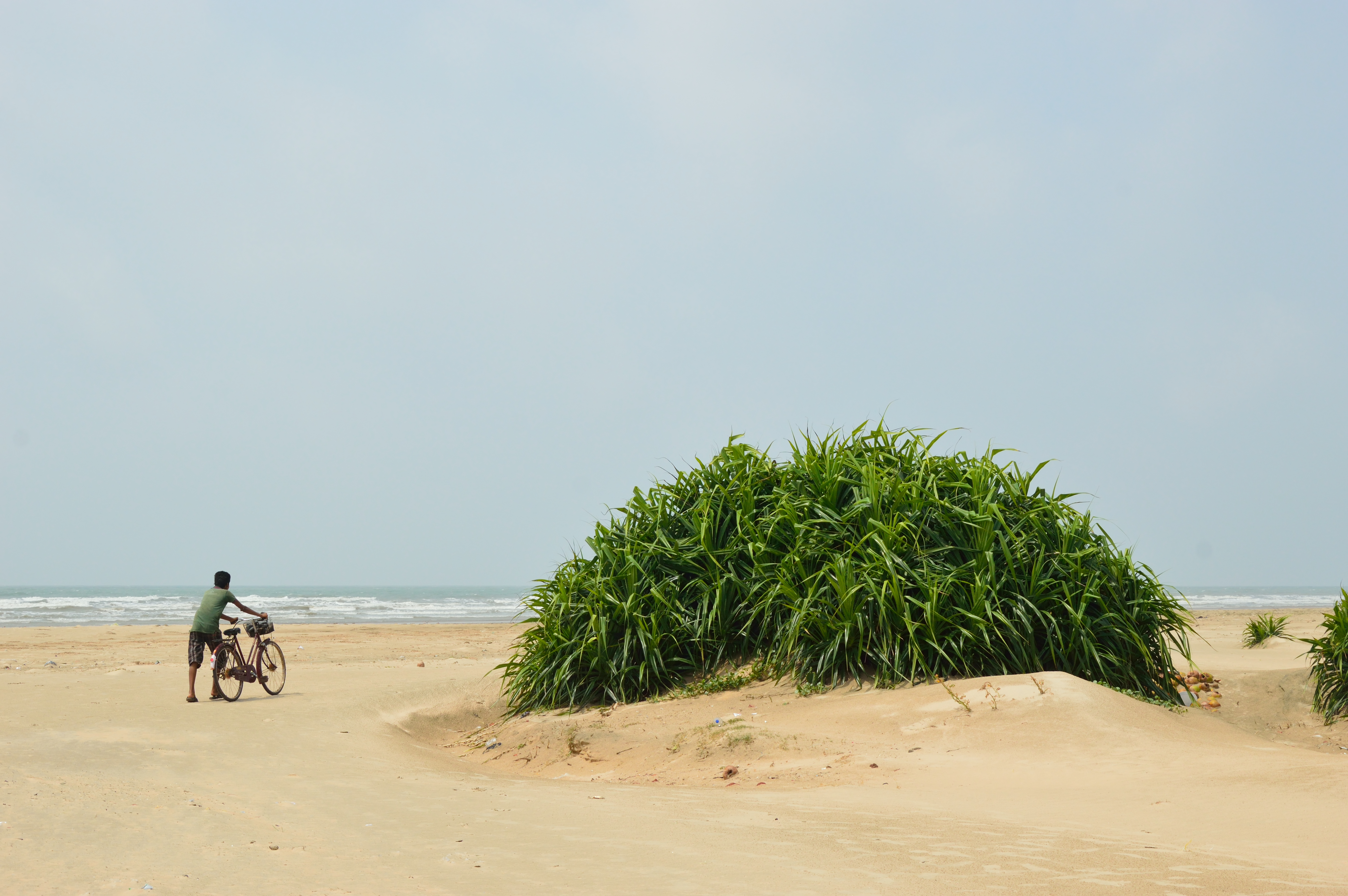
Tajpur beach. May 2015.

Tajpur is located in Purba Medinipur, in the state of West Bengal, India on the shore of the Bay of Bengal (near Digha). Tajpur is set between Mandarmani and Shankarpur. Tajpur is 172.9 km via NH16 and NH116B from the state capital Kolkata. It is located under Contai Sub division area.

Tajpur has also around 1400 acres of land dedicated to Pisciculture. There are a number of bheris or fish-ponds in the area. As a tourist attraction, it is relatively new as there are fewer hotels compared to Digha and Mandarmani. The beach is clean and home to numerous red crabs. The Government of West Bengal and Central Government decided to build the Tajpur Port in the area.

== Transport ==
The nearest railway station is Contai or Ramnagar in Howrah-Digha railways and the nearest airport is Kolkata. There are also multiple buses running towards Digha via Balisai. (Nearer to Tazpur)

=== By Car ===
From Kolkata, after crossing the Vidyasagar Setu, Kona Expressway leads to Mumbai Road. As the total drive takes almost 4 hours from Kolkata via Kolaghat and Nandakumar. From Nandakumar there is a right turn towards Contai. In the said Kolkata - Digha highway there is stoppage named Balisai where a left side village road finally meet the sea side village Tazpur.
