= Inland Vessels Act, 2021 =

Parliament of India
- Long title: An Act to promote economical and safe transportation and trade through inland waters, to bring uniformity in application of law relating to inland waterways and navigation within the country, to provide for safety of navigation, protection of life and cargo, and prevention of pollution that may be caused by the use or navigation of inland vessels, to ensure transparency and accountability of administration of inland water transportation, to strengthen procedures governing the inland vessels, their construction, survey, registration, manning, navigation and such other matters connected therewith or incidental thereto.
- Citation: Act No. 24 of 2021
- Territorial extent: India
- Passed by: Lok Sabha
- Passed: 29 July 2021
- Passed by: Rajya Sabha
- Passed: 2 August 2021
- Assented to by: President
- Assented to: 11 August 2021
- Commenced: 16 February 2022–Section 1 and 106; 7 June 2022–Section 2 to 105 and 107 to 114

Legislative history

Initiating chamber: Lok Sabha
- Bill title: The Inland Vessels Bill, 2021
- Bill citation: Bill No. 99 of 2021
- Introduced by: Sarbananda Sonowal (MoP,S&W)
- Introduced: 22 July 2021
- Passed: 29 July 2021

Revising chamber: Rajya Sabha
- Passed: 2 August 2021

Repeals
- Inland Vessels Act, 1917
- Status: In force

The Inland Vessels Act, 2021 (Act No. 24 of 2021) is an Act of the Parliament of India enacted to replace the colonial-era Inland Vessels Act, 1917. It was enacted for regulating inland water transport.

It establishes a unified framework for the registration, safety, and operation of inland vessels across the country, promoting uniformity, safety, and efficiency in inland water transport.
