= Tajpur Port =

Tajpur Port তাজপুর বন্দর
- Interactive map of Tajpur Port তাজপুর বন্দর
- Location in India West Bengal

Location
- Country: India
- Location: Tajpur, Purba Medinipur, West Bengal
- Coordinates: 21.6446941°N 87.6101216°E

Details
- Owned by: Government of West Bengal
- Type of harbour: Deep-sea port
- Draft depth: 16 metres (52 ft)
- Length of approach channel: 18.8 kilometres (11.7 mi)
- Water depth at harbour basin: 18 metres (59 ft)

Tajpur Port (Bengali: তাজপুর বন্দর) is a proposed greenfield deep-sea port in Tajpur, East Midnapore district, West Bengal. The port will be built on the coast of Bay of Bengal near Tajpur. The construction of the port was awarded to the Adani Ports and Special Economic Zone Limited in September, 2022. Chief Minister Mamata Banerjee handed over Letter of Intent (LoI) to build the port to Karan Adani, son of Adani Group Chairman Gautam Adani, at the "Bijaya Sammelani" organized on 12 October 2022 at Eco Park, New Town, Kolkata. After the construction of the port, it will be the first deep-sea port in West Bengal. It is estimated that the port will be constructed at a cost of ₹25,000 crores ($3.1 billion) .

The port will consist of a harbour protected by Breakwaters, and deep channel. Cargo will be handled through port's container terminal, dry bulk cargo terminal, multipurpose cargo terminal and coal terminal. It will have a maximum depth of 18 meters and will be able to accommodate panamax and capesized vessels. A statement from the state government estimated that the port's net draft with tidal support would be around 16 meters, allowing Capesize vessels with 100,000 DWT (deadweight tonnage) to enter the proposed port.

== Location and meteorology ==
Tajpur Port site is situated on the coast of Bay of Bengal at Tajpur, located in the Indian state of West Bengal. The port is located 170 km (110 mi) from India's third-most populous Megacity, Kolkata. It is located 380 km (240 mi) and 100 km (62 mi) away from industrial city of Asansol and port city of Haldia by road respectively.

Topographically the port site is situated on a flat land, which are sloping gently. Unconsolidated sedimentary deposits of Quaternary period are seen in this area. The area falls under the deltaic plain of Bengal, and the deltaic plain of Bengal is characterized by thick deposits of unconsolidated sediments. The port area falls under class III seismic zone, which indicating a moderate risk of earthquakes. As there are no natural harbour, there are plans to build artificial harbour by Breakwaters, along with port infrastructure on reclaimed land from the sea.

== History ==
=== Background ===
West Bengal's main port is Kolkata Port (including Haldia Port), but because of the shallow depth of the Hooghly river, it is impossible to anchor ocean-going vessels there. As a result, shipping growth is declining. Commodities in Kolkata and Asansol-Durgapur industrial region are instead taken to Paradip port. The future of the state's port industry and the Haldia industrial region is uncertain and, for this reason, the state government decided to act.

=== Planning ===
The proposal to build the port at Tajpur was made by the Government of West Bengal, which was first announced by Mamata Banerjee–the Chief Minister of West Bengal–in 2016. Its main objective was to overcome the navigability problem of the Haldia Dock Complex and Kolkata Dock System belonging to the Port of Kolkata in West Bengal, which created a problem of excess cost in importing and exporting goods. Other benefits include proximity to deep-sea port to West Bengal's industrial hubs and reduced dependence on ports in the neighboring state of Odisha, and improved sea connectivity with the rest of the world.

The Government of West Bengal had initially decided to build this port on a build–operate–transfer (BOT) model through private sector as a single initiative. The Ministry of Ports, Shipping and Waterways of India subsequently expressed interest to join the port project, and demanded a 76 percent stake for the Port of Kolkata (now Syama Prasad Mookerjee Port, Kolkata). However, the Government of West Bengal was willing to give 26 percent stake in the proposed port project. Later, the Government of West Bengal informed that if the Government of India provided financial assistance for the construction of a bridge over the Muri Ganga River to connect Sagar Dwip in South 24 Parganas with the mainland, then 76 percent stake of the Port project would be given to the Port of Kolkata. Even after accepting the state's proposal, the Government of West Bengal took up the plan to build the port by the private sector due to taking no initiative on the bridge construction project.

It was informed by the Government of West Bengal, the total investment for the construction of the port will be approximately ₹25 thousand crores, of which ₹15 thousand crores will be invested by private companies for the construction of port infrastructure, and the West Bengal government itself will invest 10 thousand crores for the construction of road and necessary infrastructure. This port construction project will create about 25,000 jobs directly and more than one lakh jobs indirectly.

=== Development ===
In January 2019, the state decided to develop the port on its own, as the state government alleged that the centre had done "nothing" to start work on the project in the prior three years.

The West Bengal government called for expressions of interest (EoI) from global agencies to set up a deep-sea port in Public-Private Partnership in East Midnapore at Tajpur on 28 December 2020. Mamata Banerjee had announced that around ₹4,200 crore will be the investments by the State government, West Bengal Chief Minister.The project is expected to draw investments to the tune of ₹15,000 crore; There will not be any land acquisition involved as there is adequate land available for the project, she had said.

== Port details ==
=== Harbour ===
The harbour of the Tajpur deep sea port will be an artificial harbour, which protected by Breakwaters. The prescribed water depth for the harbour basin is 18 meters, which will accommodate large ships; the maneuvering basin between the harbour basin and the approach channel will be 16 meters deep. The land required for the construction of infrastructure for cargo handling will be reclaimed from the sea by filling with sediment.

Terminals

Six berths are to be built in the first phase followed by an additional nine berths. By separating it from the coast, beaches are not expected to be impacted. Each terminal will be multipurpose.

=== Approach channel ===
Depth of water in the channel
Depth		Measure (meters)
Condition	Value	Measure (meters)
Natural depth	Seabed (below CD)	3.5–12.5 metres (11–41 ft)
Natural depth	Dredged	12.5 metres (41 ft)
Tidal depth	Maximum (Highest observed water level)	18.90 metres (62.0 ft)
Tidal depth	Minimum (Lowest observed water level)	16.20 metres (53.1 ft)

An 18.8 km (11.7 mi) long approach channel at open sea will be used for the movement of ships to the port's harbour. The approach channel has a depth of 12.5 m (41 ft) below chart datum and 14 metres (46 ft) below Sea level (MSL), and a minimum width of 200 m (660 ft), allowing vessels with a draft of 12 m to arrive and depart the harbour without tidal assistance. However, the highest and lowest tides observed in the harbour area are 4.90 m (16.1 ft) and 2.20 m (7.2 ft) above Sea level (MSL) respectively, which can significantly increase the depth of the approach channel. At high tide the channel will be more than 16 m (52 ft) deep with tidal support; vessels with a maximum draft of 16 meters (52 ft) or more and a minimum draft of 14 meters (46 ft) are able to navigate during this period.

== Connectivity ==
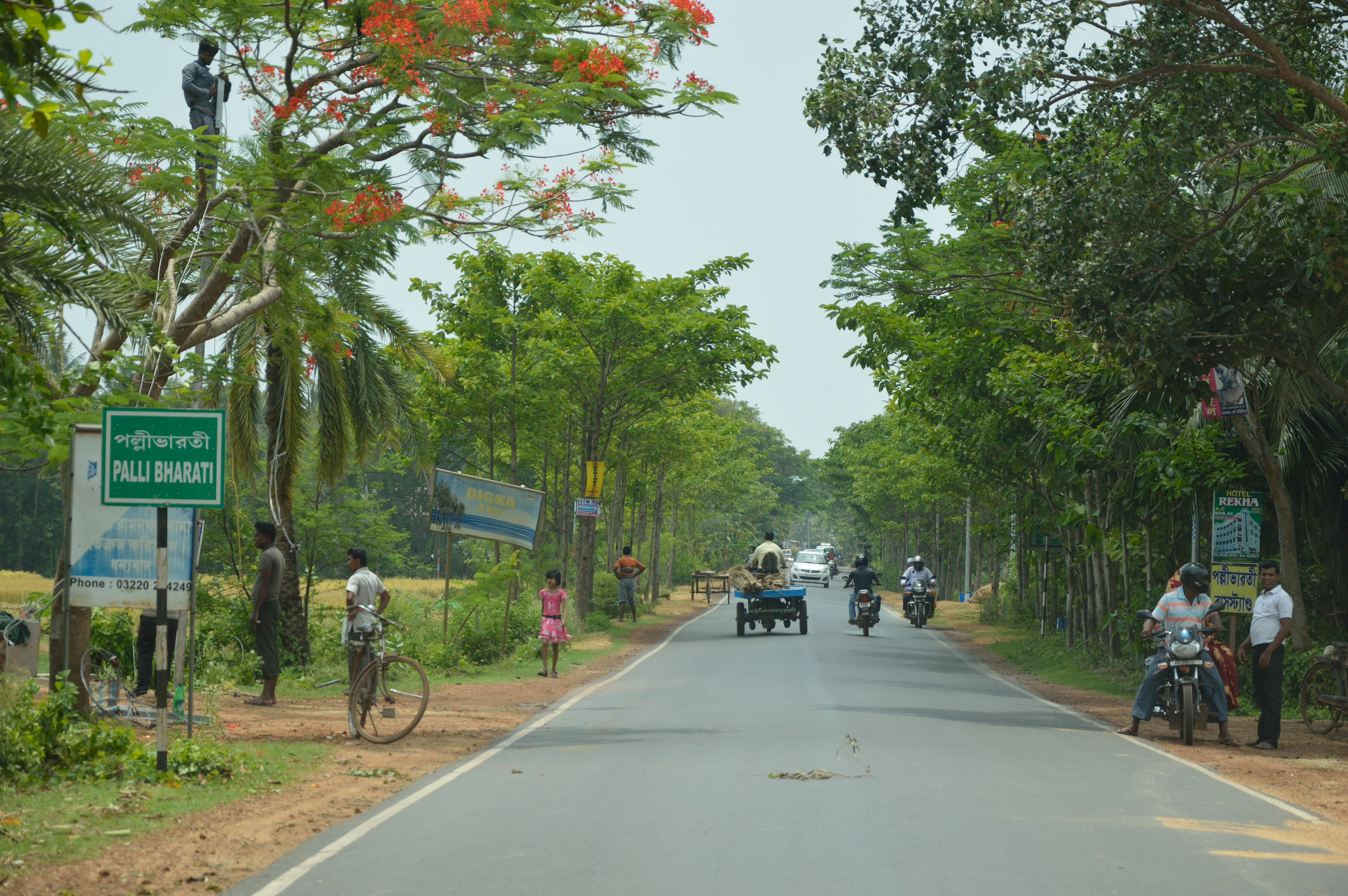
Contai-Digha section of National Highway 116B.

The nearest national highway from the port is National Highway 116B, which is at a distance of 5.5 km. The national highway starts from National Highway 116 at Nandakumar and ends at Digha near Tajpur. A 4-lane road has been planned for seamless connectivity between the port and the national highway.

There are plans to connect the port to the existing Tamluk–Digha branch line. The port is connected to Dankuni, the eastern terminus of the Eastern Dedicated Freight Corridor, and Kharagpur, the eastern terminus of the proposed East-West Dedicated Freight Corridor, through the Tamluk-Digha branch line. By rail, Dankuni is 217 km and Kharagpur is 119 km from Tajpur.
