= Moti Jharna =

- Village
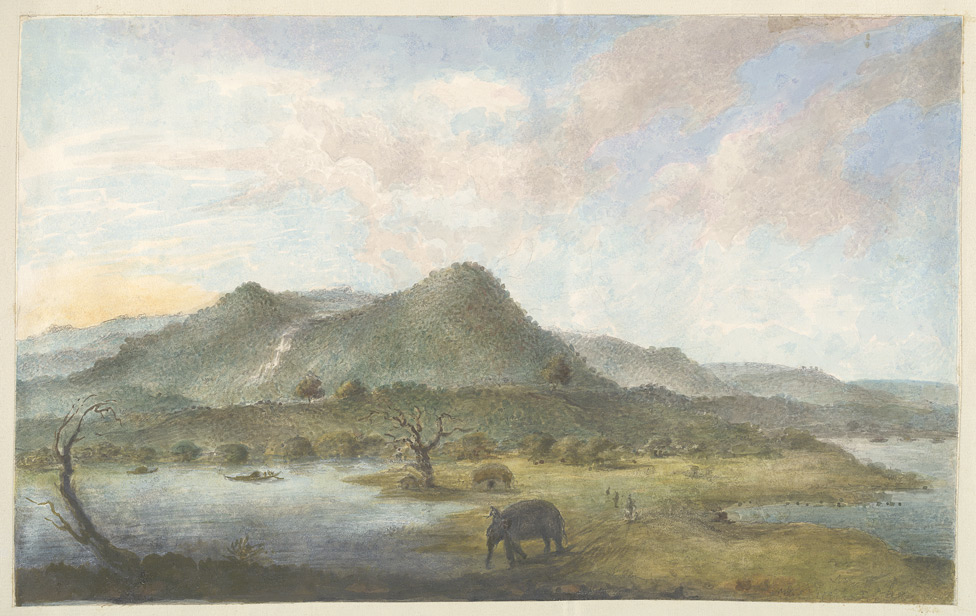
- The Moti Jharna waterfall in the Rajmahal Hills, by Sita Ram in 1820

- Location in Jharkhand, India Moti Jharna (India)
- Coordinates: 25.207144°N 87.726189°E
- Country: India
- State: Jharkhand
- District: Sahibganj

Population (2011)
  - Total: 3,107

Languages (*For language details see Taljhari#Language and religion)
  - Official: Hindi, Urdu
- Time zone: UTC+5:30 (IST)
- PIN: 816109
- Telephone/ STD code: 06426
- Lok Sabha constituency: Rajmahal
- Vidhan Sabha constituency: Borio
- Website: sahibganj.nic.in

Moti Jharna is a village in Taljhari CD block in Rajmahal subdivision of Sahibganj district in the Indian state of Jharkhand.

== Geography ==
Cities, towns and locations in the Sahibganj, Godda and Pakur districts in Santhal Pargana Division
M: municipality, CT: census town, R: rural/ urban centre, H: historical/ religious/ tourist centre
Owing to space constraints in the small map, the actual locations in a larger map may vary slightly

=== Location ===
Moti Jharna is located at 25.207144°N 87.726189°E.

Moti Jharna has an area of 117 hectares (290 acres).

=== Overview ===
The map shows a hilly area with the Rajmahal hills running from the bank of the Ganges in the extreme north to the south, beyond the area covered by the map into Dumka district. ‘Farakka’ is marked on the map and that is where Farakka Barrage is, just inside West Bengal. Rajmahal coalfield is shown in the map. The entire area is overwhelmingly rural with only small pockets of urbanisation.

The place is reachable through road transport facilities like taxis and auto-rickshaws, from Sahibganj and has connectivity to regional road and rail networks of Sahibganj district.

== Demographics ==
According to the 2011 Census of India, Moti Jharna had a total population of 3,107, of which 1,654 (53%) were males and 1,453 (47%) were females. Population in the age range 0–6 years was 649. The total number of literate persons in Moti Jharna was 1,412 (57.45% of the population over 6 years).

== Waterfall ==
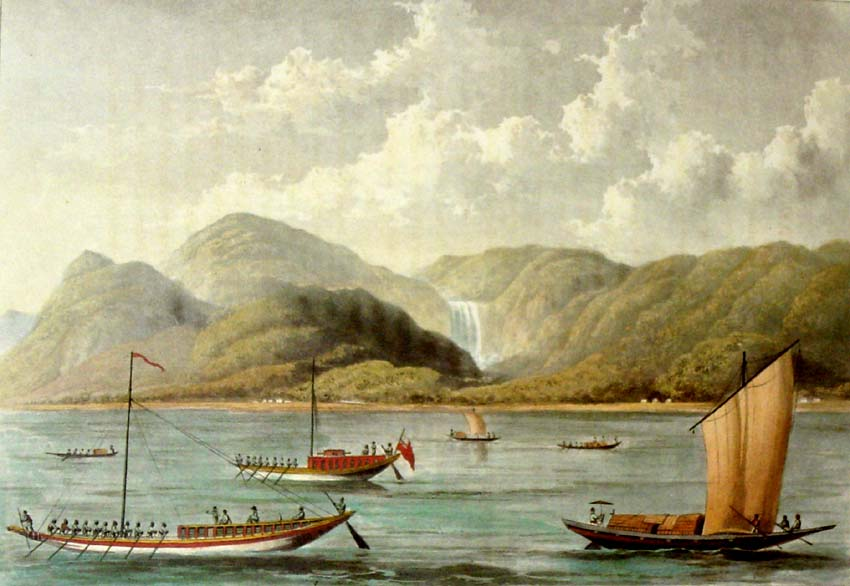
The Motee Girna, or Fall of Pearls, in the Rajemahal Hills, ca. 1824, by an English traveller C. R. Forrest

Moti Jharna (pearl cascade) is the most picturesque waterfall in Sahebganj district, at the head of a picturesque glen of the Rajmahal hills. The water of a small hill stream tumbles over two ledges of rock, each 50 to 60 feet high. It is about 2 miles (3.2 km) from Maharajpur railway station on the Sahibganj loop.
