= National Waterway 1 =

Indian waterway from Uttar Pradesh to West Bengal

National Waterways (NW-1)
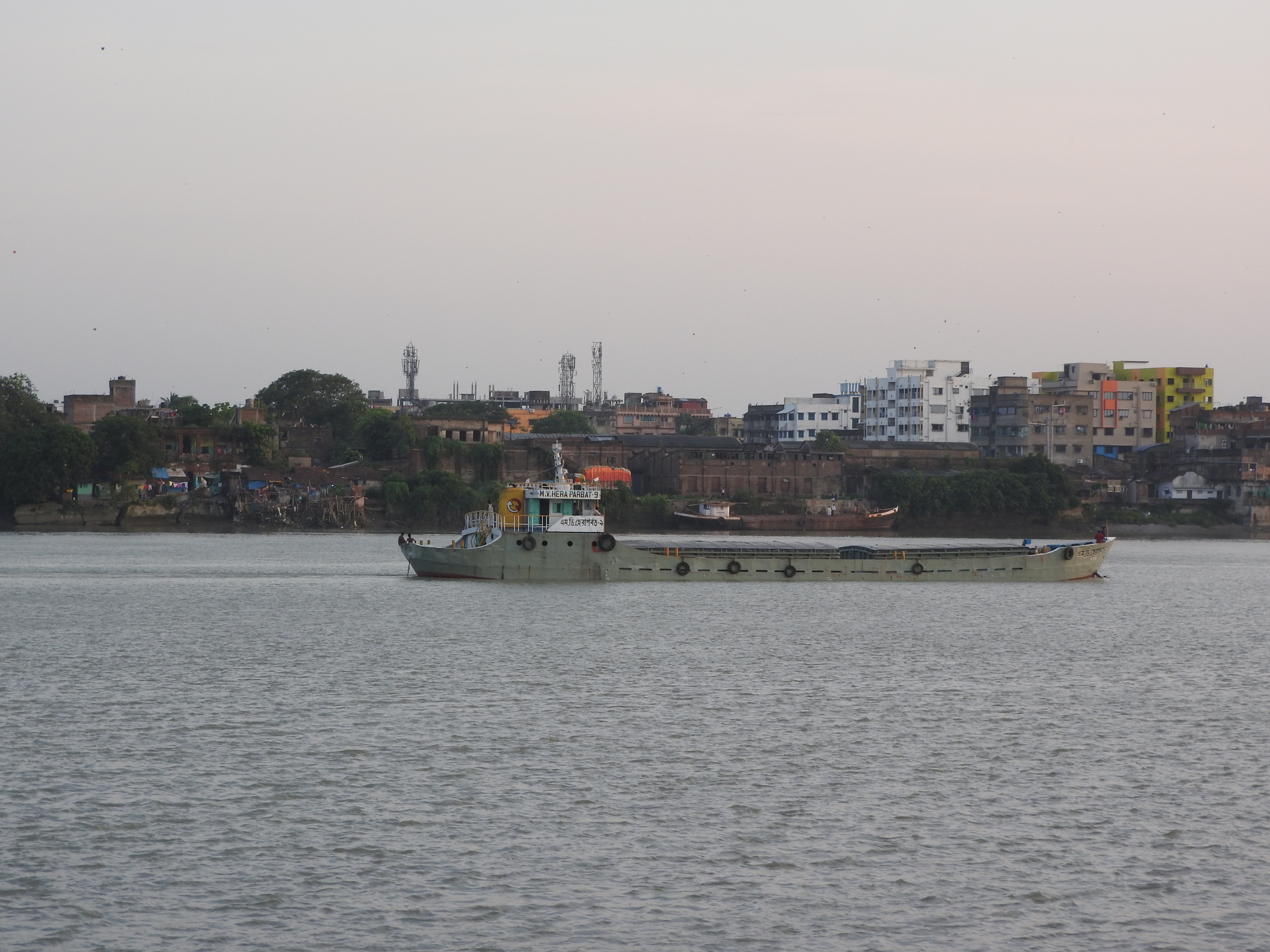
- A ship in National Waterway 1

Details
- Location: India
- Opened: 27 October 1986; 39 years ago
- Length: 1,620 km (1,010 mi)
- No. of terminals: 18 Floating Terminal; 2 Fixed RCC Jetty
- Owner: Inland Waterways Authority of India (IWAI)
- Operator: Central Inland Water Transport Corporation (CIWTC)

The National Waterway 1 (NW-1) or Ganga-Bhagirathi-Hooghly river system is located in India and runs from Prayagraj in Uttar Pradesh to Haldia in West Bengal via Patna and Bhagalpur in Bihar across the Ganges river. It is 1,620 km (1,010 mi) long, making it the longest waterway in India. The NW-1 passes through West Bengal, Jharkhand, Bihar and Uttar Pradesh and serves major cities and their industrial hinterlands like;

- Haldia
- Howrah
- Kolkata
- Saran
- Bhagalpur
- Munger
- Patna
- Ghazipur
- Varanasi
- Prayagraj

It was declared as a waterway in October 1986. It is navigable by mechanical boat up to Patna.

== Development ==
The topography of NW-1 falls within the flat terrain of the Indo-Gangetic plain. The elevation ranges from 1 to 321 m (3 to 1,053 ft) above mean sea level. The land is predominantly agricultural with some of the major cities of India lying in this region. For thousands of years, river Ganga and its tributaries and distributaries have been used for navigation and to transport people and local produce from these agricultural lands.

Land use within the influential area of NW-1
1. Cultivation (78.9%)
2. Water Bodies (7.21%)
3. Settlement (7.18%)
4. Vegetation (3.59%)
5. Dry River Beds (2.82%)
6. Misc (0.30%)

On 12 August 2016 Nitin Gadkari, the Union Minister for Shipping, Road Transport and Highways laid the foundation stone of the waterway terminal at Varanasi, Uttar Pradesh. He flagged off the trial run of two vessels which carried newly manufactured cars of Maruti Suzuki from Varanasi to Haldia, West Bengal.

On 12 November 2018 Prime Minister Narendra Modi inaugurated multi-modal terminal at Varanasi.

The NW-1 is being developed at an estimated cost of ₹4,200 crore (US$440 million), with financial assistance of US$375 million from the World Bank. The 1,620 km (1,010 mi) route of NW-1 will be upgraded to maintain the following least available depth to allow for higher tonnage vessels of 1,500-2,000 tonnage to ply on the route.

Least available depth on NW-1
Stretch	Distance	Least Available Depth
Praygraj to Ghazipur	370 km (230 mi)	1.2 to 1.5 m (3.9 to 4.9 ft)
Ghazipur to Barh	290 km (180 mi)	2 m (6.6 ft)
Barh to Farakka	400 km (250 mi)	2.5 m (8.2 ft)
Farakka to Haldia	560 km (350 mi)	3 m (9.8 ft)

=== Major challenges ===
One of the major changes to the development of NW-1 is braiding and meandering characteristics of river Ganga and the large fluctuation of the water volume during the summer and monsoon months. The major challenges are:

- Braiding and meandering characteristics of river
- Large fluctuation of the water level — from 16.5 m (54 ft) at Prayagraj to 2 m (6.6 ft) at Farakka
- Fluctuation of water velocity — from 4 m/s (14 km/h; 8.9 mph) during flood season to 0.2 m/s (0.72 km/h; 0.45 mph) during dry seasons
- High silt load - Ganges carries around 1,600 million tonnes of silt annually
- Shoal and island formation leading to splitting of main channel
- Changes to navigation line due to the lateral migration of the river
- Existence of power line pylons at various locations
- Existence of pontoon bridges are a significant threat to navigation — about 7 pontoon bridges are present between Buxar and Prayagraj which are in use
- Existence of critical bridges with horizontal clearance less than 70 m (230 ft) and vertical clearance less than 9 m (30 ft)

== Route ==
Sl No	Name of Terminal	Land area	Size of berth	Type of terminal
1	Haldia Multi-Modal Terminal	10,319 m^{2} (111,070 sq ft)	200 m (660 ft)	Floating Terminal
2	Botanical Garden Jetty	996 m^{2} (10,720 sq ft)	50 m (160 ft)	Floating Terminal
3	BISN Jetty	11,606.64 m^{2} (124,932.8 sq ft)	100 m (330 ft)	Floating Terminal
4	Shantipur	8,000 m^{2} (86,000 sq ft)	100 m (330 ft)	Floating Terminal
5	Katwa	Pontoon placed on water front	30 m (98 ft)	Floating Terminal
6	Hazardwari	Pontoon placed on water front	30 m (98 ft)	Floating Terminal
7	Farakka Port	4,800 m^{2} (52,000 sq ft)	80 m (260 ft)	Floating Terminal
8	G.R.Jetty - 2	14,606 m^{2} (157,220 sq ft)	216 m (709 ft)	Fixed RCC Jetty
9	Rajmahal	Pontoon placed on water front	35 m (115 ft)	Floating Terminal
10	Sahebganj Multi-Modal Port	Pontoon placed on water front	35 m (115 ft)	Floating Terminal
11	Bateshwar Sthan, Kahalgaon	Pontoon placed on water front	35 m (115 ft)	Floating Terminal
12	Bhagalpur	1,000 m^{2} (11,000 sq ft)	35 m (115 ft)	Floating Terminal
13	Munger	13,759 m^{2} (148,100 sq ft)	35 m (115 ft)	Floating Terminal
14	Patna	13,112 m^{2} (141,140 sq ft)	46.6 m (153 ft)	Fixed RCC Jetty
15	Barh	-	27 m (89 ft)	Floating Terminal
16	Balughat, Saran	Pontoon placed on water front	-	Floating Terminal
17	Buxar	Pontoon placed on water front	-	Floating Terminal
18	Ghazipur	Pontoon placed on water front	35 m (115 ft)	Floating Terminal
19	Varanasi Multi-Modal Terminal	Pontoon placed on water front	35 m (115 ft)	Floating Terminal
20	Semaria	Pontoon placed on water front	35 m (115 ft)	Floating Terminal
21	Prayagraj	87,590 m^{2} (942,800 sq ft)	35 m (115 ft)	Floating Terminal

== Traffic ==
Even today the stretch of the river assigned as NW-1 is being used to transport cargo — mostly local produce and tourists. The Ministry of Shipping projects that the NW-1 will carry mostly bulk goods. Cargo like cement, iron ore, coal and coal combustion products, crude oil and petroleum products, rock phosphate, timber, stone chips, manganese ore and agricultural produce Finished iron products from the number of steel plants present in this region will also be a major cargo in this route.

Traffic (cargo) forecast on NW-1
Terminal Node	Projected Cargo (million tons per annum)		
Terminal Node	2015	2030	2045
Sahibganj Terminal	2.24	4.39	9.00
Varanasi Terminal	0.54	1.22	1.22
Haldia Terminal	4.07	4.07	4.07

== Controversy ==
The National Waterway 1 was landed in a controversy and protests after Nitin Gadkari, the Union Minister of Shipping in July, 2014 announced that the government will construct barrages every 100 km (62 mi) on river Ganga and will undertake dredging activities in identified stretch to provide a width of 45 m (148 ft) and a depth of 3 m (9.8 ft) to enable transport of passengers and goods between Varanasi and Hooghly on river Ganga in the first stage of its development. The initial proposal is based on a study by Danish Hydrological Institute, which prepared reports on two stretches between Prayagraj and Varanasi and between Varanasi and Buxar. The announcement was made after World Bank agreed to fund the initial US$50 million including technical support without any public consultation. The move was criticized by river activists and professors of Banaras Hindu University.

=== Involvement of World Bank ===
A representation was sent by several experts on the environmental and social impact of reviving the NW-1 to Government of India and World Bank in August, 2014. The representation was led by economist Dr. Bharat Jhunjhunwala along with a group of environmentalists and former bureaucrats. The representation was followed by meetings with World Bank. The World Bank representatives were briefed about the ecological and social implications of the proposal. The adverse impact on river bank communities, the unmitigated displacement of people due to erosion at Farakka, a cost-benefit analysis for all stakeholders involved and whether taxation of the waterway will render it unviable. The World Bank clarified that they were unaware of the plan to construct 16 barrages and no funds had been disbursed till then. However, as per a letter dated 18 June 2014 forwarded by Shipping Minister Mr. Nitin Gadkari to the Finance Minister, Mr. Arun Jaitley, a proposal for financial assistance to four navigational barrages was made.

=== Opposition from Chief Minister of Bihar ===
The Government of Bihar led by Chief Minister Nitish Kumar opposed the initiative to construct barrage on Ganga stating that construction of barrages will convert Ganga into big ponds. He stated that not a single drop of pure water from Ganga reaches Bihar due to similar barrages in upstream of the river. Later, the Inland Waterways Authority of India (IWAI) has clarified that there are at present no plans to construct any new barrage on the 1,620 km (1,010 mi) stretch of the NW-1 on the Ganga.

=== Dredging of Ganga ===
Environmentalist Debadityo Sinha claimed that World Bank has possibly scrapped the plan for construction of barrages for the National Waterway-1 after public opposition from Uttar Pradesh and Bihar. However, significant maintenance dredging of the river Ganga will be undertaken by the government of India to make it navigable. The author also alleged that the Ministry of Environment, Government of India has made an amendment in law in January, 2016 in which dredging activities for maintenance is exempted from the requirement of Environmental Clearance.

=== Threat to Gangetic Dolphin and aquatic fauna ===
Wildlife Biologist Nachicket Kelkar claimed that the noise and disturbance caused by intensive dredging activities is known to have deleterious impacts on aquatic biodiversity, especially the National Aquatic Animal of India, the Ganges River Dolphin which is basically founded in Bhagalpur region of Bihar. In particular, substrate-breeding fish species are negatively affected by dredging and might even become locally extinct following failed breeding. As a bulk of fisheries depends on benthic (bottom-dwelling) fishes in most of India’s larger rivers, this will mean important threat to the sustainable production of fish in these systems as well.

=== Destruction of Self-Purification of Ganga ===
A study done by NEERI, a government of India funded research institution shows that the river Ganga is unique in its sediment content that is more radioactive compared to any other river and lake water sediments. These sediments release Copper and Chromium and have bactericidal properties that multiply coliphages reducing and ultimately eliminating coliforms from water. River activist and economist Dr. Bharat Jhunjhunwala has claimed that the dredging activities undertaken will destroy the self-purification capacity unique to the Ganga.

== See also ==
- Inland Waterways Authority of India
- Amritsar Delhi Kolkata Industrial Corridor
