= Varanasi Multi-Modal Terminal =

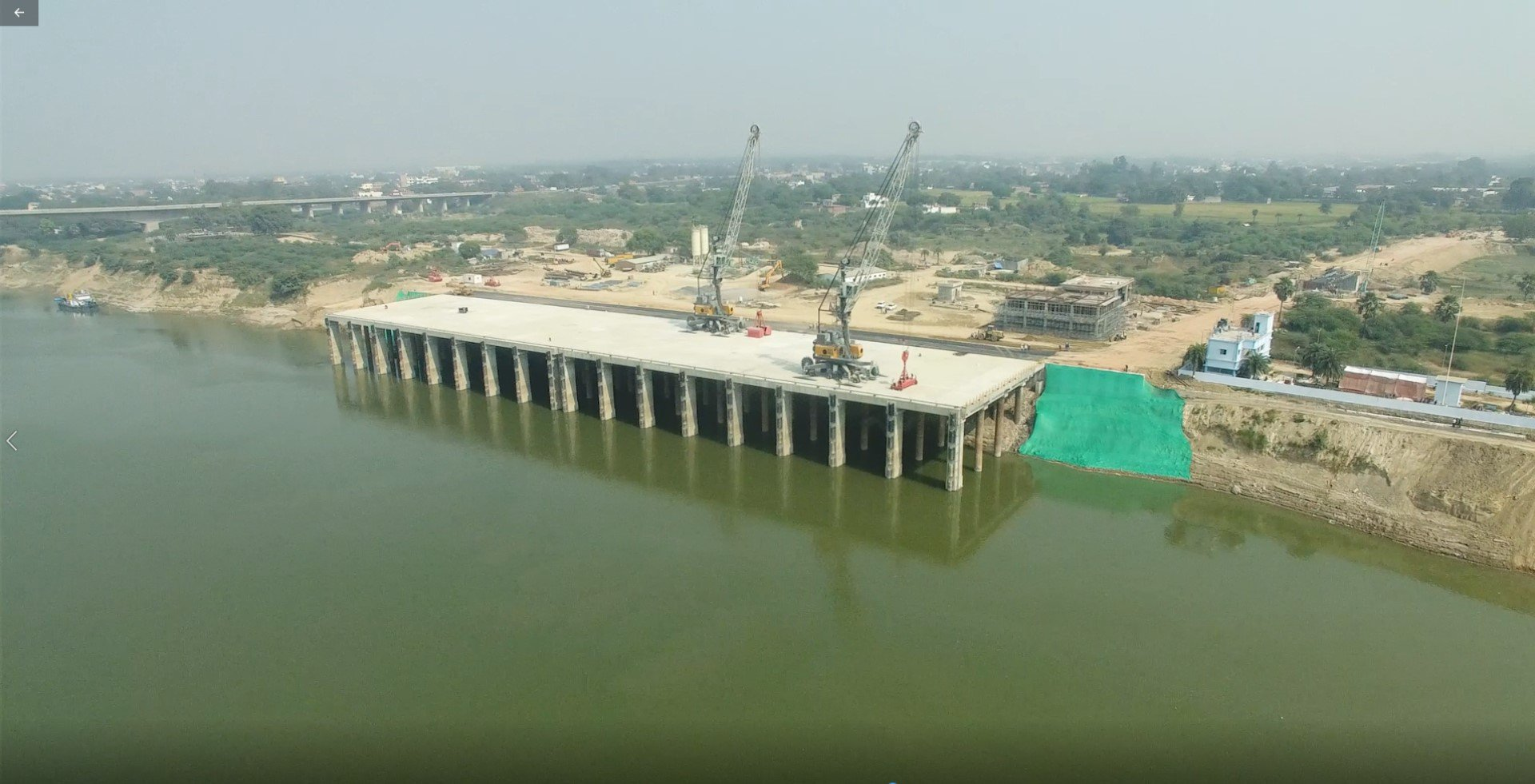
- Click on the map for a fullscreen view

Location
- Country: India
- Location: Khirkiya Ghat, Ramnagar, Varanasi, Uttar Pradesh
- Coordinates: 25.2518616°N 83.027995°E

Details
- Opened: 12 November 2018
- Operated by: Inland Waterways Authority of India
- Owned by: Government of India
- Type of harbour: River port
- No. of berths: 2
- Depth: 2.2 metres (7 ft 3 in)
- Capacity: 1.26 MTPA
- Status: Active

Varanasi Multi-Modal Terminal or Varanasi Port is an Inland river port situated in the city of Varanasi, Uttar Pradesh. The port is located on the Ganges river. This port is built under the government's Jal Marg Vikas project. The port has provided a direct link with the Port of Kolkata and Haldia Port.

The cargo handling capacity of the port or terminal is estimated to be 1.2 million metric tons per year (MTPA). The Port was completed in 2018.

== Facilities ==
The port has the ability to anchor two ships at a time simultaneously. The port also has other facilities which include deposit area, commodity transit shade, parking area etc. It also has floating jetty with terminal for passenger transport.
