= Inland Waterways Authority of India =

Indian government agency

- भारतीय अन्तर्देशीय जलमार्ग प्राधिकरण

Agency overview
- Formed: 27 October 1986; 40 years ago
- Type: Statutory authority
- Headquarters: A-13, Sector-1 Noida, Uttar Pradesh
- Agency executive: Sushil Kumar Lohani, IAS, Chairman
- Parent department: Ministry of Ports, Shipping and Waterways
- Website: http://www.iwai.nic.in/

Inland Waterways Authority of India (IWAI) is the statutory authority in charge of the waterways in India. It was constituted under IWAI Act-1985 by the Parliament of India. Its headquarters is located in Noida, Uttar Pradesh.

India has an extensive network of inland waterways in the form of rivers, canals, backwaters and creeks. The total navigable length is 14,500 km, out of which about 5200 km of the river and 4000 km of canals can be used by mechanised crafts. Freight transportation by waterways is highly under-utilised in India compared to other large countries and geographic areas like the United States, China and the European Union. The total cargo moved (in tonne kilometres) by the inland waterway was just 0.1% of the total inland traffic in India, compared to the 21% figure for the United States. Cargo transportation in an organised manner is confined to a few waterways in Goa, West Bengal, Assam, and Kerala.

It does the function of building the necessary infrastructure in these waterways, surveying the economic feasibility of new projects and also administration. On 31 August 2018, IWAI made 13 standardised state-of-art design public for the transportation of cargo and passengers keeping in mind Ganges complex river morphology, hydraulics, acute bends, currents etc. in National Waterway 1. The first implementation will be between Varanasi-Haldia stretch in assistance and investment from the World Bank.

== History ==
Inland Waterways Authority of India was created by the Government of India on 27 October 1986 for development and regulation of inland waterways for shipping and navigation. The Authority primarily undertakes projects for development and maintenance of Inland Waterway Terminal infrastructure on National Waterways through grant received from the Ministry of Ports, Shipping and Waterways, Road Transport and Highways. The head office is at Noida. The Authority also has its regional offices at Varanasi, Patna, Kolkata, Guwahati Bhubaneswar and Kochi and sub-offices at Prayagraj, Bhagalpur, Sahibganj, Farrakka, Dhubri, Dibrugarh, Vijayawada, Goa and Kollam.

== Classifications and standards ==
| Classification | Tonnage | Length (M) | Breadth (M) | Draught (M) | Air Draft (M) | Barge Composition |
| Class-1 | 100 | 32 | 5 | 1 | 4 | Self Propelled |
| Class-1 | 200 | 80 | 5 | 1 | 4 | 2 Barges + 1 Tug |
| Class-2 | 300 | 45 | 8 | 1.2 | 5 | Self Propelled |
| Class-2 | 600 | 110 | 8 | 1.2 | 5 | 2 Barges + 1 Tug |
| Class-3 | 500 | 58 | 9 | 1.5 | 6 | Self Propelled |
| Class-3 | 1000 | 141 | 9 | 1.5 | 6 | 2 Barges + 1 Tug |
| Class-4 | 1000 | 70 | 12 | 1.8 | 7 | Self Propelled |
| Class-4 | 2000 | 170 | 12 | 1.8 | 7 | 2 Barges + 1 Tug |
| Class-5 | 1000 | 70 | 12 | 1.8 | 10 | Self Propelled |
| Class-5 | 4000 | 170 | 24 | 1.8 | 10 | 2*2 Barges + 1 Tug |
| Class-6 | 2000 | 86 | 14 | 2.5 | 10 | Self Propelled |
| Class-6 | 4000 | 210 | 14 | 2.5 | 10 | 2 Barges + 1 Tug |
| Class-7 | 2000 | 86 | 14 | 2.5 | 10 | Self Propelled |
| Class-7 | 8000 | 210 | 28 | 2.5 | 10 | 2*2 Barges + 1 Tug |

== Budget ==
Till 2010, an amount of ₹1,117 crore (US$120 million) was spent on Inland waterways of India.

== Executives ==
Sushil Kumar Lohani is the current Chairman of the Authority.

== National waterways ==
Based on the data available on navigable waterways, compiled by the ministry of statistics and programme implementation, by 2015–16 a total of 106 water bodies with a minimum length of 25 km (16 mi) were declared as national waterways. These have been classified into 3 categories based on financial viability and location as well as into 8 clusters based on locations. In first phase, 8 national water (NW) of category-1 that are considered most viable will be developed. There are 60 category II NWs in coastal regions with tidal stretches and feasibility reports for 54 of these (6 are in phase-1) will be delivered from May 2016 onwards

=== National Waterway 1 ===
Detail Chart of NW-1

- Prayagraj–Haldia stretch of the Ganges–Bhagirathi–Hooghly river system.
- Estd = October 1986
- Length = 1,620 km (1,010 mi)
- Fixed terminals = Haldia, Kolkata, Sahibganj, Farrakka and Patna.
- Floating terminals = Haldia, Kolkata, Diamond Harbour, Katwa, Tribeni, Baharampur, Jangipur, Bhagalpur, Munger, Semaria, Doriganj, Ballia, Ghazipur, Chunar, Varanasi and Prayagraj
- Cargo Movement = 4 million tonnes

=== National Waterway 2 ===
- Sadiya–Dhubri stretch of Brahmaputra river it provides connectivity with mainland India through the India Bangladesh Protocol Rule
- Estd = September 1988
- Length = 891 km (554 mi)
- Fixed terminals = Pandu.
- Floating terminals = Dhubri, Jogighopa, Tezpur, Silghat, Dibrugarh, Jamuguri, Bogibil, Saikhowa and Sadiya
- Cargo Movement = 2 million tonnes

=== National Waterway 3 ===
- Kozhikode–Kollam stretch of the West Coast Canal, Champakara Canal and Udyogmandal Canal.
- Estd = February 1993
- Length = 205 km (127 mi)
- Fixed terminals = Aluva, Vaikom, Kayamkulam, Kottappuram, Maradu, Cherthala, Thrikkunnapuzha, Kollam and Alappuzha
- Cargo Movement = 1 million tonne

=== National Waterway 4 ===
- Kakinada–Puducherry stretch of canals and the Kaluvelly Tank, Bhadrachalam – Rajahmundry stretch of River Godavari and Wazirabad – Vijayawada stretch of River Krishna
- Estd = November 2008
- Length = 1,095 km (680 mi)

=== National Waterway 5 ===
- Talcher–Dhamra stretch of the Brahmani River, the Geonkhali – Charbatia stretch of the East Coast Canal, the Charbatia–Dhamra stretch of Matai River and the Mangalgadi – Paradip stretch of the Mahanadi River Delta
- Established = November 2008
- Length = 623 km (387 mi)

=== National Waterway 6 ===
NW-6 is a waterway between Lakhipur and Bhanga of the Barak River.

- In Assam, Lakhipur to Bhanga stretch of Barak River.
- Estd = 2016
- Length = 121 km (75 mi)

== See also ==
- Indian Railways
- Inland Vessels Act, 2021
- List of national waterways in India
- National Highways Authority of India (NHAI)
- Transport in India
