= Sahebganj Multi-Modal Port =

The Sahibganj multi-modal port or Sahibganj River Port is a multi-modal port situated at Sahebganj on the Ganga. The project is estimated to cost ₹6,500 crore. It was inaugurated by PM Modi in September 2019. The Inland Waterways Authority of India has awarded the contract for the creation of multipurpose transportation terminals to Larson and Toubro (L & T) (22.2 mMTP handling capacity in the first phase).

A statement issued by the Ministry of Shipping said that "Multi-modal terminals will have facilities for two ship-houses, stockwidth for storage, fixed hopper, class loader, bank protection, road, ramp and parking area and terminal buildings with belt conveyor system."
