= Borio (disambiguation) =

Borio refers to a brand of biscuits local to Egypt

It also refers to:

- Borio (community development block), in Jharkhand, India
- Borio (Vidhan Sabha constituency), an assembly electoral constituency in Jharkhand, India
- Borio, Sahibganj, a census town in Jharkhand, India
