= Battle of Katwa (1763) =

1763 battle part of the Bengal War

- Part of Bengal War
Date	19 July 1763
Location	Katwa, Bengal Subah
Result	British victory

Belligerents
Nawab of Bengal; Mir Qasim	British East India Company; Mir Jafar

Commanders and leaders
Gurgin Khan; Muhammad Taqi Khan	Major Thomas Adams

Strength
Unknown	5,000 est. 1,000 Europeans; 4,000 Indian sepoys

Casualties and losses
Unknown	Unknown

The Battle of Katwa (1763) occurred between the Nawab of Bengal, Mir Qasim and the British East India Company in 1763. Dissatisfied with Nawab Mir Qasim's administration, the English deposed him in favor of his father-in-law Mir Jafar and officially declared war against Mir Qasim on July 7, 1763. The English command was given to Major Thomas Adams, who led a small force, variously estimated as between 3,000 and 5,000 men, of whom, approximately 1,000 were European. The Nawab had a total of approximately 25,000 troops at his disposal, led by the Armenian general Gurgin Khan. Although the Nawab's forces were numerically larger, they were hastily cobbled together and riven by internal strife. The Nawabi force that confronted the English at Katwa was a much smaller contingent under the leadership of the accomplished general Muhammad Taqi Khan, the Faujdar of Birbhum.

On July 17, 1763, the English forces marching from various cantonments in Medinipur and Bardhaman districts, established post at Agradwip, a village 14 km downstream from Katwa. There they were met by the newly re-instated Nawab Mir Jafar. Meanwhile, Mir Qasim's forces had established themselves at Palashi, 20 km upstream from Katwa. On that morning, a band of irregular Nawabi forces, mostly cavalry, engaged Lieutenant Glenn of the English forces, who was escorting a convoy of cattle, grain, and treasure to Agradwip. The battle lasted four hours with the treasure changing hands three times. Ultimately, after heavy casualties on both sides, the Nawabi forces withdrew and Lieutenant Glenn pressed his advantage by marching upon the fort at Katwa. The Nawabi garrison at Katwa surrendered after putting up a feeble resistance.

Meanwhile, Muhammad Taqi Khan had advanced the main body of his forces to Katwa; and on the morning of July 19, 1763, Major Adams advanced to attack him. The battle which followed has been described as "one of the bloodiest and best-contested of the whole war." Ultimately, the British were able to ambush and kill Muhammad Taqi Khan, dealing a double blow to Mir Qasim's cause by winning the immediate battle and depriving Mir Qasim of the expertise and military acumen of one of his best generals in future battles.

== See also ==
- Battle of Buxar
