= Bengal War =

1756–1765 Mughal attempt to recapture Bengal from the British East India Company

- Part of the Anglo-Indian wars
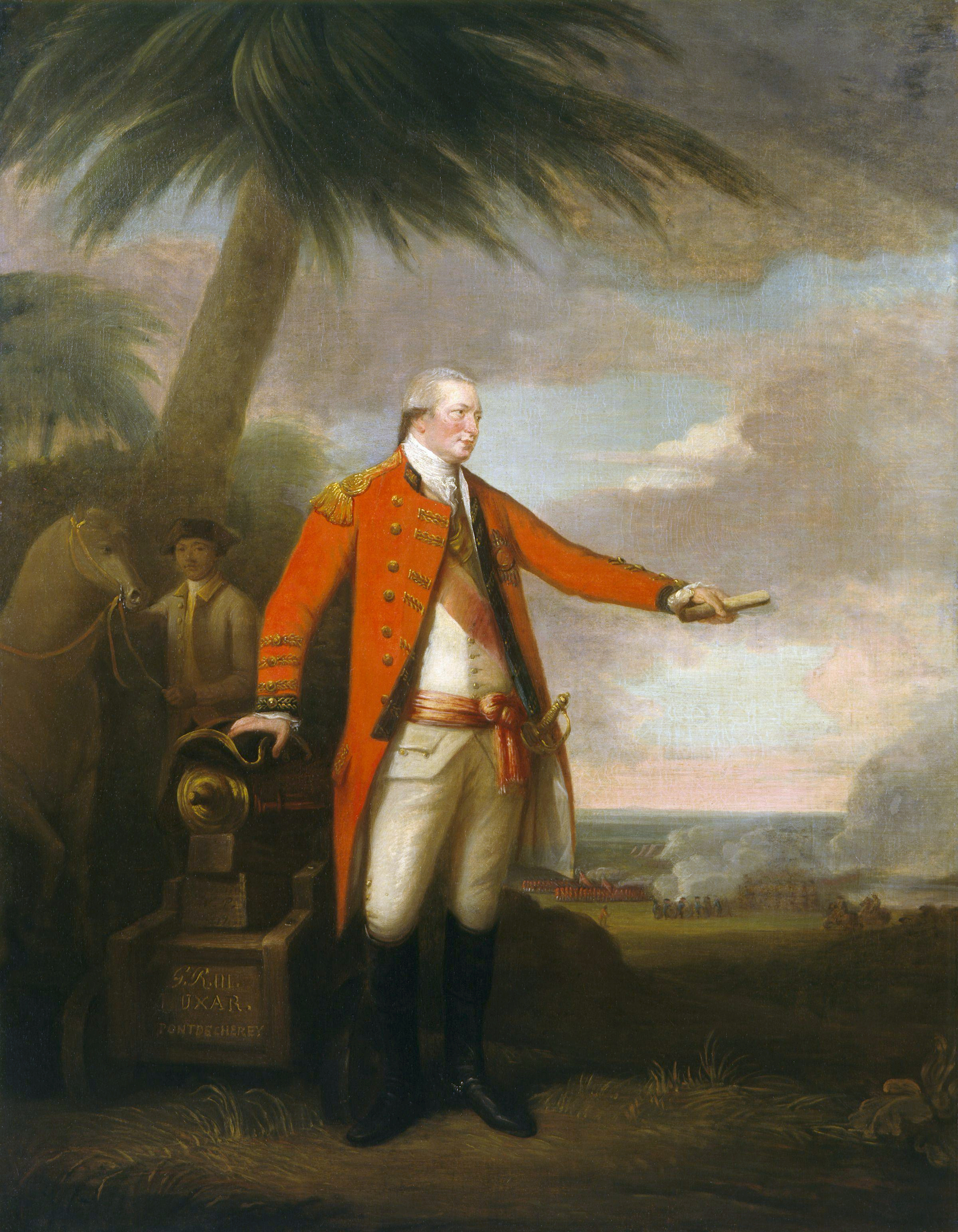
- Portrait of Sir Hector Munro with the Battle of Buxar in the background
Date	25 June 1763 – 16 August 1765 (2 years, 1 month, 3 weeks and 1 day)
Location	Bengal Subah
Result	British victory: Treaty of Allahabad; Formal establishment of Company rule over the region of Bengal in 1772.

Belligerents
Mughal Empire; Awadh Subah; Bengal Subah; Kashi Kingdom	British East India Company

Commanders and leaders
Shah Alam II; Najaf Khan; Shuja-ud-Daula; Mir Qasim; Balwant Singh	Hector Munro; John Caillaud; Thomas Adams; William Ellis (executed)

The Anglo-Bengal War, also called the second Anglo-Mughal war, was a war between a coalition consisting of the Mughal Empire, the Awadh Subah and the Bengal Subah against the British East India Company (EIC) from 1763 to 1765, ending with a British victory and the signing of the Treaty of Allahabad on 16 August 1765.

== Background ==
Under the Mughal Empire, Bengal, which was variously described as the 'Paradise of Nations', had been one of its wealthiest and most prosperous subahs (provinces), accounting for 40% of all Dutch exports from Asia, and was a major exporter of silk and cotton textiles, steel, saltpeter, and agricultural and industrial produce.

The British East India Company (EIC) had been trading in the East Indies ever since the early 17th century, however, following the Amboyna massacre in 1623, which saw an attack on one of their factories in the spice islands by the Dutch, they were compelled to abandon their efforts in Southeast Asia and shift their focus almost entirely to the Indian subcontinent and Bengal specifically. They had first acquired a lease on the banks of the river Hughli in 1658 and later established their chief fort in the region, Fort William, in 1696. Throughout this period their relationship with Mughal authorities was one of imbalance, during this period, they mostly acted as junior partners to Mughal authority and rarely butted heads with them. The only exception to that, where they tried using military force (the Anglo-Mughal war), ended terribly for the company, with them being forced to swear fealty to the Mughals just to get their factories back.

In Bengal up till this point, the provincial government was separated into two major cabinets, the Nizamat (governorship) presided over by a Subahdar who oversaw general administration, justice and defense and the Diwani (Premiership) presided over by a Chief Diwan who oversaw revenue administration, both positions were to ultimately answer to the Emperor.

In 1704, over a bitter rivalry between the incumbent Subahdar, Royal prince Azim-ush-Shan, and his Chief Diwan, Murshid Quli Khan, which led to the former being shifted elsewhere by Aurangzeb, leaving Murshid Quli Khan as the sole de facto governor of all of Bengal Subah, Aurangzeb would die 3 years later. This meant that, aside from the striking of coins in the Mughal Emperor's name and nominal tribute to the court, Bengal became independent under Murshid in all but name, as became the norm in many other Subahs of the Empire following his death and the various succession crises that followed soon after. This was cemented in 1717 in Bengal when Mughal Emperor Farrukhsiyar officially granted the title of Nawab (equivalent to Grand duke) to him.

This allowed for the English to grow their own influence in this anarchy. In 1717, Farrukhsiyar also issued a farman (decree) that granted the EIC the right to trade within Bengal coupled with some exemptions for taxation. While as per Indian custom, this was but honorary, in the eyes of company officials it had granted them an "encompassing devolved sovereignty over Bengal", making them equal to even the newly christened Nawab and sowing the seeds of tension between the two.

=== Initial tensions ===
With the outbreak of the Austrian War of Succession in Europe, the EIC fought numerous wars against the French for control of the south-eastern coast of the subcontinent. Starting in September 1746, when French Navy officer Mahé de La Bourdonnais landed off Madras with a naval squadron and laid siege to the city, which fell after 3 days. Following a failed counterattack by the British and the Nawab of Arcot, Anwaruddin Khan, to retake the city and a failed siege of Pondicherry, the war ended in 1748 with the Treaty of Aix-la-Chapelle, which brought back the Status quo ante bellum.

Between the Company's notion of sovereignty over Bengal and the outbreak of the Carnatic wars with France in the south, tensions with the Nawab were high, with the attitude of Nawab Alivardi Khan (r. 1740 - 1756) towards the Europeans being described as 'strict', causing friction between him and the British who frequently complained of Alivardi's taxing of them to finance defenses against the Marathas during the Maratha invasions of Bengal and not being allowed to enjoy the full privileges granted to them as per Farrukhsiyar's Decree.

When Nawab Siraj ud-Daulah ascended to the throne in April 1756, he was deeply suspicious of the large profits made by the British and troubled by their notion of 'sovereignty' by constructing a fort at Calcutta and so began seeking an alliance with France; despite this he still tried to keep the line of negotiation with the EIC open, however negotiations broke down soon after the outbreak of the Seven Years' War, which while largely taking place in the South on the Indian front, prompted both the French and the British to improve their fortifications in Bengal, which Siraj ud-Daulah opposed, while the French yielded the British did not, sparking war between both parties.

On 1 June 1756, a column of the Nawab's men marched on the Company factory at Cossimbazar and seized it easily before setting off towards the other factory at Calcutta, which was besieged on June 16th and fell 4 days later. When news of this broke in Madras on 16 August, the Company sent a detachment under Colonel Robert Clive to retake Calcutta and restore the Company's previous privileges, the ensuing conflict lasted nearly a full year, culminating at the Battle of Plassey on 23 June 1757. In the aftermath of which, Siraj ud-Daulah was arrested, tried and executed at the behest of the British, and Mir Jafar would be placed on the throne as a puppet of the British up till his removal in 1760, with his son-in-law Mir Qasim taking his place.

Upon his ascension, Qasim awarded the company with lavish gifts, as did Mir Jafar, though just like his predecessor, he too realized the difficulty of appeasing the company with the royal coffers at Murshidabad nearly depleted and ran into multiple issues with the company regarding trade. For example, to enrich themselves, the company had passed an enactment in virtue of which country goods that had European passes should be allowed to descend the Hooghly River, a major artery of trade, without paying the transit duty, while goods unprovided with such passes should pay a heavy tax. Even the English flag flying over a boat or a fleet of boats, or the appearance on board of Bengalis dressed as English sepoys, was sufficient to exempt the boats from the search. This system, initially in place to enrich company officials, so greatly disorganised local trade that entire cities were left impoverished and Bengali merchants were left destitute.

When Qasim retaliated, placing a modest 9% duty on European traders' private goods as against a duty of 40% for Indians, the Company revolted against it, even after he reduced it from 9% to 2.5% on salt, and they further refused to admit the right of the local faujdars or police officers to adjudge disputes. Finally, Qasim abolished all custom duties on internal trade altogether. The Company objected to this, demanding that they be reinstated, to which Qasim refused, charting the path towards war.

== Hostilities ==
Hostilities officially began on 25 June 1763, when Company agent William Ellis, initially sent as part of a delegation to mediate negotiations with the Nawab Mir Qasim, attacked his capital city of Patna with a force of some 300 British infantrymen and 2,500 sepoys and was met with a counterattack of some 10,000 sepoys and rebels loyal to Mir Qasim led by his Armenian mercenary general Gurgin Khan soon after, leading to a British defeat and the capture of Ellis.

After the defeat of British forces at the battle, command was put under the command of Major Thomas Adams, who began the campaign on 2 July. The first major engagement of the campaign was at Katwa. At the onset, Qasim had numerical superiority and superior artillery, led by Gurgin Khan, though it was fraught with internal strife, and the column that engaged Lieutenant Glenn's force near the British camp of Agradwip on the morning of the 17th was considerably smaller and led by a band of cavalry irregulars, who, after hours of fighting, were defeated by the British, who continued to press towards the fort at Katwa, which surrendered with feeble resistance.

Then, on 19 July, Mir Qasim's general, the Faujdar of Birbhum Mohammed Taki Shah, moved the vanguard of his force to Takwa, which saw "one of the bloodiest and best-contested battles of the whole war." Ultimately, Taki Shah was killed, and Qasim was forced to retreat.

Mir Qasim set up his defenses near Jangipur on Sooty on the plain of Giria. British forces under Major Thomas Adams attacked on 2 August 1763 and, after a bloody battle, forced Mir Quasim to retreat to Udaynala.

Mir Qasim was defeated again at Udaynala, where the British, headed by Major Thomas Adams, successfully stormed a well-defended Ganges gorge at Teliagarhi downstream of Rajmahal on 5 September 1763. After inflicting heavy losses at the gorge, Adams captured Monghyr.

After Udaynala, Mir Qasim killed the British soldiers captured in the 1st battle of Patna. Major Thomas Adams besieged Patna and captured the town in the 2nd battle of Patna on 6 November 1763 that saw heavy losses in the Bengal army.

Mir Qasim forged an alliance against the East India Company with Mughal Emperor Shah Alam II and the Awadhi Nawab Shuja-ud-Daula.

On 3 May 1764, British EIC forces under the command of Colonel John Carnac were victorious in a 3rd battle at Patna against the Nawab of Oudh, Shuja-ud-Daula. The British occupied defensive positions outside of Patna and caused heavy losses for the attacking Shuja's forces. After repulsing the attack, Carnac decided against a pursuit, but heavy rains caused Nawab's retreat a month later.

=== Battle of Buxar ===
On 23 October 1764, following the third Patna battle, British forces under the command of Major Hector Munro, despite their numeric inferiority, carried a decisive victory over Indian allies at Buxar, west of Patna.

After the battle of Buxar, Mir Qasim's and Shujah-ud-Daula's forces retreated into the Gangetic Doab with Major John Carnac in pursuit. They managed to join forces with a Marathi army headed by Malhar Rao Holkar. In May 1765 the British successfully defeated them. After the rout that followed, Malhar Rao fled to Kalpi, and Mir Qasim sued for peace.

== Aftermath ==
As a result of the war, the EIC became an indispensable military and fiscal instrument for the Mughal Emperor, who was relying on the Company's military protection and financial means. While becoming effectively an indispensable power in Bengal and Northern India by controlling the Bengal diwani in exchange for a fixed payment, the company was also saddled with a large cost that the EIC was forced to continue carrying due to commercial and political reasons. The document granting the revenues to the EIC was treated as a proto-constitution, a "Magna Carta".

In 1772 (Judicial Plan of 1772), the East India Company took complete control of the former Mughal province of Bengal, and it marked the beginning of British East India Company rule in Bengal.

== See also ==
- Shah Alam II
- Mir Jafar
- Great Bengal famine of 1770

== Sources ==
- Bayly, C. A. (2013). "The British Military–Fiscal State and Indigenous Resistance India 1750–1820". An Imperial State at War: Britain From 1689-1815. Taylor & Francis. pp. 322–354. ISBN 978-1-134-54602-2.
- Clodfelter, M. (2017). "Bengal War: 1763−65". Warfare and Armed Conflicts: A Statistical Encyclopedia of Casualty and Other Figures, 1492-2015, 4th ed. McFarland, Incorporated, Publishers. ISBN 978-1-4766-2585-0.
- Hill, S.C., ed. (1905), Bengal in 1756–1757, Indian Records, vol. 1, London: John Murray, OCLC 469357208
- Jaques, Tony (2006-11-30). Dictionary of Battles and Sieges [3 Volumes]. Westport, Conn: Greenwood. ISBN 978-0-313-33536-5. OCLC 68786744.
- Malleson, G.B. (1885). The Decisive Battles of India: From 1746 to 1849 Inclusive. W.H. Allen & Company.
- Nadeau, Adam (June 2023). Inheriting Empire: Royal proclamations, parliamentary legislation, and imperial integration in British North America and India, 1760-1793 (Doctor of Philosophy thesis). University of New Brunswick.
- Thompson, E.; Garratt, E.T.G.T. (1999). "The Conquistadores". History of British Rule in India. Atlantic Publishers & Distributors (P) Limited. pp. 80–98. ISBN 978-81-7156-803-1.
