= William Fullerton (surgeon) =

British surgeon and politician

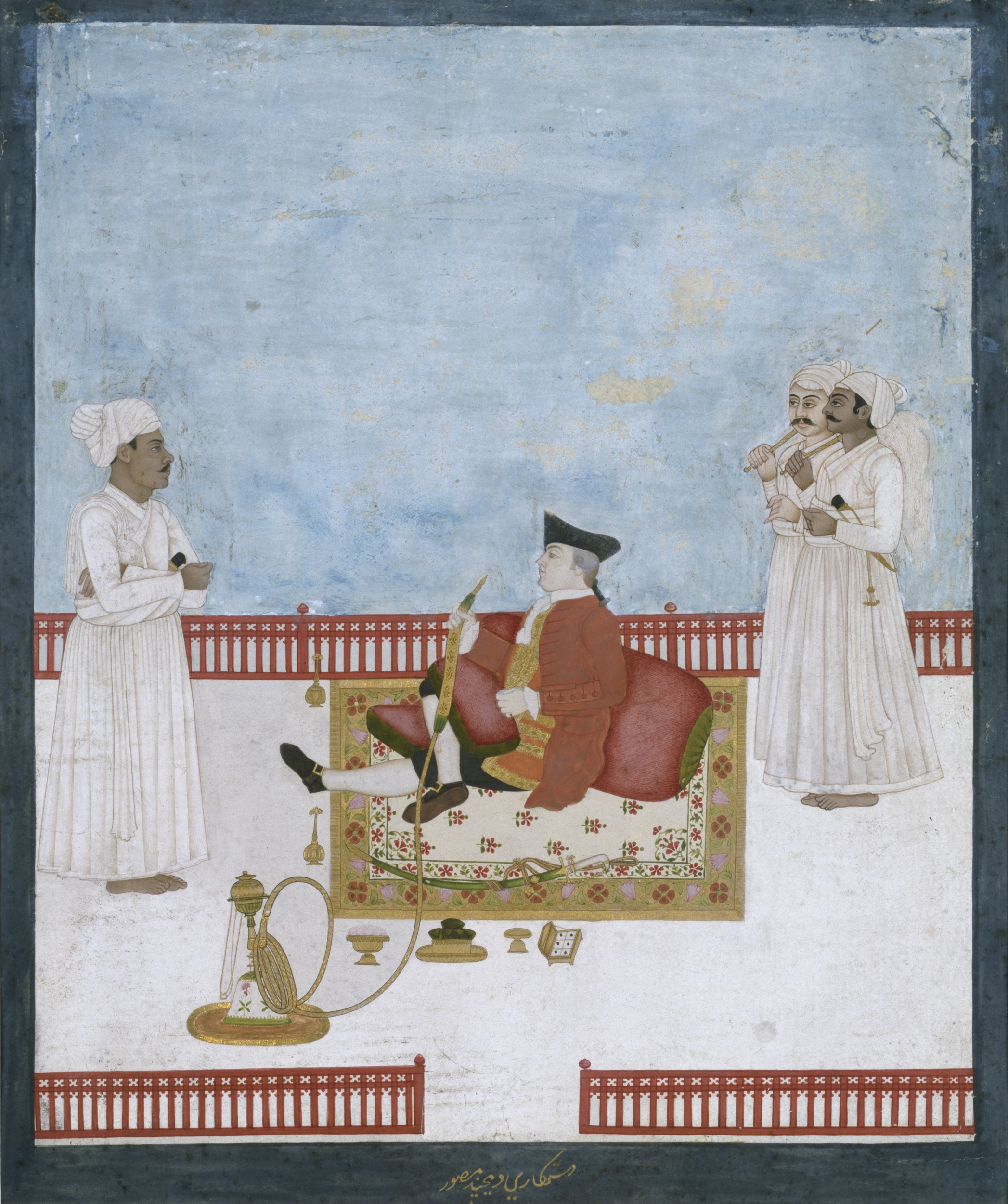
- Possible portrait of Fullerton
- Died: 22 October 1805
- Known for: Surviving Patna massacre of 1763
- Medical career
- Profession: Surgeon
- Institutions: East India Company

William Fullerton (died 22 October 1805) was a British surgeon and politician who served the East India Company in Bengal and Bihar from 1744 to 1766. He is best known for his close ties with local people, their languages and for surviving the 1763 attack by the order of Nawab Mir Qasim of Bengal, against the British.

== Early life ==
William Fullerton was born in Symington, South Ayrshire. His year of birth is unknown.

== Career ==
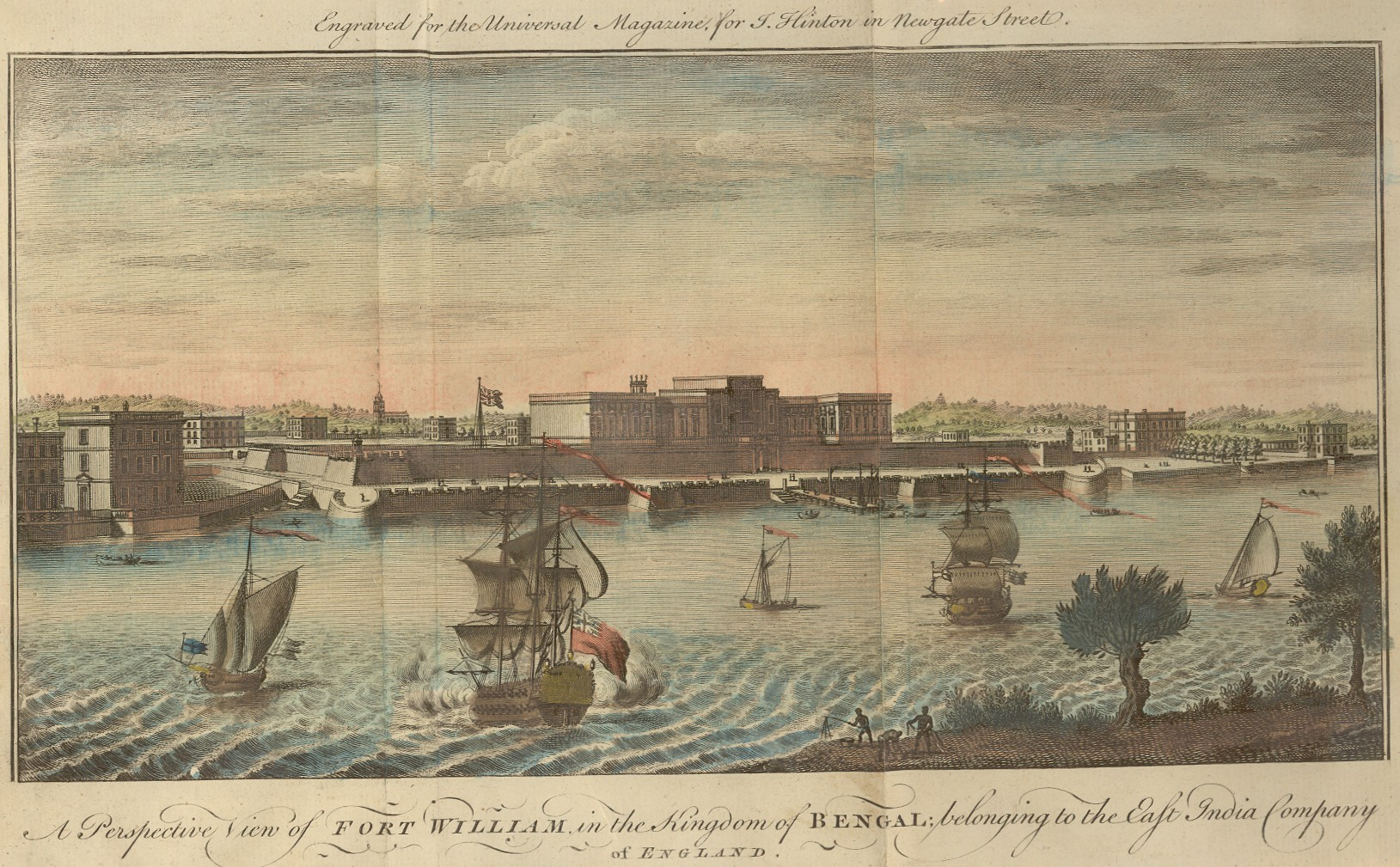
"A Perspective View of Fort William" by Jan Van Ryne, 1754

Fullerton entered the service of the East India Company and went to Bengal in approximately 1744. He was appointed Second Surgeon at Fort William on 3 July 1751 and remained in the post for ten years. He was present at the siege of Calcutta and had escaped down the river, avoiding incarceration in the Black Hole of Calcutta. On 8 December 1757 he was elected Mayor of Calcutta for a year. He was reported to have made good money whilst in Bengal, including an award of £30,000 as compensation for suffering caused in the siege of Calcutta.

In 1760 he transferred to Bihar. Fullerton was a member of a small Company force which was assisting the Nawab of Bengal Mir Qasim in a conflict with Shah Alam. He was present at the Battle of Mohsinpur and was the only surviving European officer. On the death of his fellow officers he assumed command and led a retreat to Patna where he played a significant role in the town's defence. After the conflict, he returned to Bengal and resigned his post. He intended to return to Britain but instead returned to his post as surgeon at Patna in 1763.

Fullerton was part of the Company's force that was captured by Mir Qasim near Manji in 1763. He was held captive at Patna, and present at the Patna massacre of 1763. Through intercession from Sayyid Ghulam Husain Tabatabai who regarded him as an intimate friend, Mir Kasam spared his life. He was the only European to escape unharmed from the massacre. Following his release he was placed under house arrest in Patna, until under the guise of visiting the Dutch factory, he hired a boat to take him across the Ganges river to Hajipur where some Company troops were present. After tensions with Mir Kasam subsided, Fullerton remained in Patna for a further two years. He was later accused of misrepresenting a letter written by Nand Kumar to Raja Balwant Singh of Benares suggesting a plot to overthrow Company rule in Bihar and requesting help. An inquiry was held by the Company council in Calcutta and he was censored for misconduct. In protest Fullerton tendered his resignation on 21 March 1765 and sailed for England on the Ponsborne.

== Death ==
Fullerton died in Scotland on 22 October 1805.
