= Jean Baptiste Joseph Gentil =

French army colonel (1726–1799)

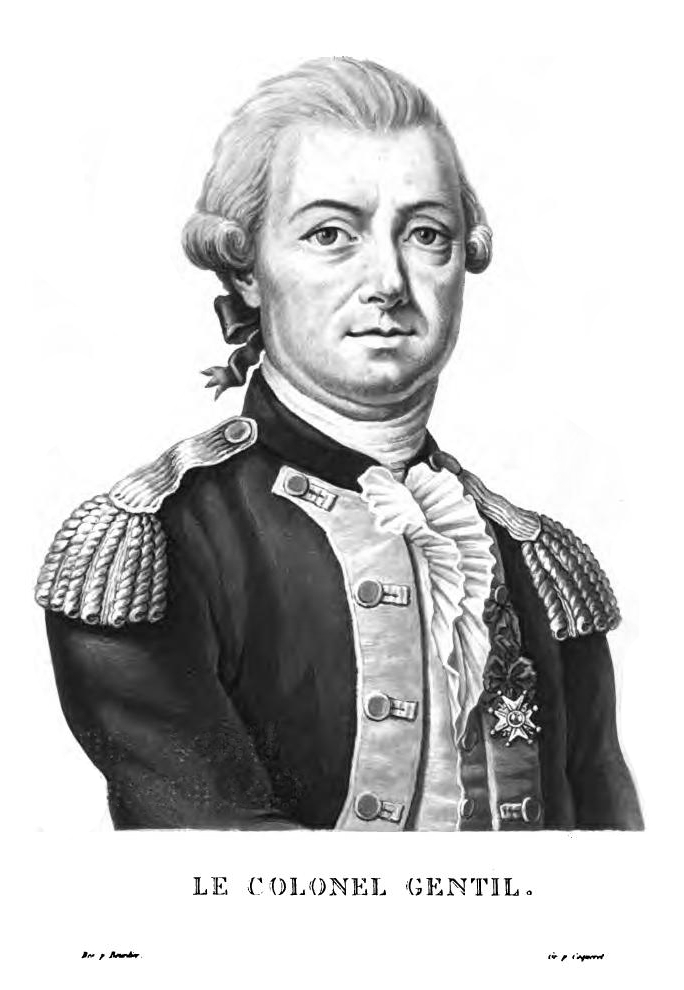

Jean Baptiste Joseph Gentil (1726–1799) was a French Army Colonel, Knight of the Royal and Military Order of Saint-Louis, who worked in India. He is known for the collections he made of historic manuscripts and artifacts from India and for his cartography and documentation of Mughal history.

Gentil was born in Bagnols-sur-Cèze in a noble family on 25 June 1726. He joined Louis XIV's East India Company in 1752 in India and served under Dupleix, Bussy, Law de Lauriston, Comte de Conflans and Lally.

After the English took over Pondicherry in 1761, he served with General Lauriston to block the English advance in Chandernagore in Bengal. The French joined hands with Nawab Mir Qasim and declared war on the English East India Company forces. He became a friend of Khwaja Gregory (Gorgin Khan, Armenian minister and commander-in-chief of the Nawab of Bengal from 1760 to 1763) and was a witness to his assassination following internal conspiracies.

Gentil joined the court of Shuja-ud-Daula at Oudh in 1763, becoming the French Resident there until 1775. He helped set up a battalion of French mercenaries who served Shuja-ud-Daula. The battalion was disbanded after his death. While serving at Oudh, he purchased a large collection of objects of natural history, weapons, medals and manuscripts in many languages. When he returned to France he donated these collections to the royal library and museum. He also produced maps of the region and wrote on the history of the Mughal Empire. He was present at the Battle of Buxar.

Gentil married Theresa Velho at Faizabad in 1772. Theresa was a grand-niece of Juliana Dias da Costa. He retired to France in 1778 and died in Bagnols-sur-Cèze in 1799.
