= Anglo-Chakma War =

War between Chakma Kingdom and British East India Company

| Date | 1777-1787 |
| Location | Chittagong Hill Tracts |
| Result | Stalemate: British influence increased; Chakma kingdom recognised formally |

Belligerents
| Chakma Kingdom; Mizo chiefdoms | British Empire |

Commanders and leaders
| Sher Daulat Khan; Jan Baksh Khan; Ranu Khan | Warren Hastings |

The Anglo-Chakma War was a conflict between the Chakma Kingdom under Sher Daulat Khan and the British Empire following the handover from Mughal Rule in 1760. Various encroachment and taxation issues, as well as land settlements, led to Chakma resistance and offences against British authority. In 1787, the war ended with a peace agreement.

== Background ==
Three years after the Battle of Plassey, Mir Qasim, the new Nawab of Murshidabad, ceded Chittagong, Burdwan and Midnapur to the East India Company. On 5 January 1761, company representative Harry Verelst took charge of Chittagong from Subedar Mohammad Reza Khan. Between the years of 1760 and 1772, the British authorities of Chittagong worked a policy of non-interference in the affairs of the Chakmas. As successors of the Mughals as authorities of Chittagong they inherited various rights to taxation and other privileges. Chowkies or inland transit duties were collected from commodities such as bamboos, chhan and other forest produce. Goorcatty duties were derived from pasturage lands and a tax was enforced on animal grazing for both uncultivated and fallow lands too. Daocatty duties were the taxes for agriculture cultivation known as jhumming. These taxes were initially limited to the Karaldenga-Patiya hill ranges before spreading to the basins of Halda, Bhandarjuri, Dolu etc. However none of the taxes were shared with the hill tribe rulers. Furthermore, the Chakma king Sher Doulat Khan, who was practically independent though nominally paid tribute to the Mughals, did not accept the hegemony of the company and its demand for increased taxes.

Three reasons are argued to have contributed to the conflict between Chakmas and the British. The disputes over the cotton tax, exploitation of Chakma resources in their territory and British encroachment of Chakma territory. The cotton tax was known as kapas mahl. Cotton was a valuable commodity produced in the hill ranges and the industries of Chittagong relied heavily on the cotton supply. East India Company reports state how a large amount of coarse cloth was produced in Chittagong with nearly all cotton procured from the hill tracts especially areas such as Rangunia. With economic growth and trade, the demand for cotton increased and British authorities became inclined to gain control of cotton. Kapas mahl was historically paid to the Mughal authorities as a Chittagong transit privilege. The British continued this tax. Superintendent Hutchinson of the Chittagong Hill Tracts once wrote that raw cotton was the tribute currency before the introduction of money in the communities in regards to the East India Company. However, the main issue in the enforcement of the tax was that historically, the Chakma kings voluntarily contributed kapas mahl to the Mughals as a privilege to trade with the plains dwelling communities. The Mughals historically did not claim hill territories and this was misconstrued by British officials upon succession. The hill ranges also held resources such as tree varieties of various value with Chittagong teak being the most prized. Jarul wood was also important in shipbuilding at the port of Chittagong. Thatched grass was also harvested by Bengalis which were owned by the Chakma king. The harvesting of these resources without the Chakma sovereign's consent was also grounds for violation of Chakma territories. The British government also hunted elephants in Chakma territory without permissions advancing as far up as Barkal for ivory.

The British also encroached on Chakma territory. This was because after the cessionary treaty of 1760, the boundaries of Chittagong were unclearly defined and there was no formal demarcation line with the Chakma territory. The British thus took advantage of the uncertain borders and encouraged Benaglis to settle in Chakma areas such as the Halda Basin area. This land became officially known as Noabad land. With the arrival of Warren Hastings, an expansionist policy was undertaken and this included Rangunia of the Chakma territory. Rangunia which was both flat and hilly contained food crops and cotton and became included into the Regulation District of Chittagong. In 1772, Mr Bentley, the collector of Chittagong contracted with the Chakma Dewan Ranu Khan for 501 annual maunds of cotton via a third party. However in 1772, Bentley without notice to Ranu Khan imposed quinquennial settlement on Rangunia especially the plains regions of Rangunia. Bentley further converted the kapas mahl into a cash paying estate calculated at ₹11,741 per year payable by land proprietors. The basis and rate of this tax was not disclosed. Conversion of cotton payments into cash was a unliteral arrangement imposed on the Chakma king. As a result, Rangunia came under the control of the district collector. The occupied area was classified as a huzuri, where a superior authority of revenue collector were to reside. Mr Bentley also introduced the Chakladari system and divided the region into nine chaklas. Rangunia was placed in among one of the chaklas. A chakladar was appointed and all revenue went through them and with cash only. The first chakladar of Ragunia was Durgaram Chowdhury who was originally chakladar of Deang. The purpose of these policies is argued to weaken the Chakma king's authority and allow British influence to increase. The Chakma King later would be dislodged from Rajanagar, the second headquarters after Rangunia. Bentley was not empowered to make such policy decisions nor directed by superiors to act in such a way. The Rangunia region plaisn were also economically important and held several paddy yielding crops. Many Chakmas left Rangunia and toom shelter in the hills as protection from British troops and had to leave their own historical territory. The evacuated lands were declared belonging to nobody. Other areas such as Raojan and Fetikchhari became classified as waste land and unpossessed. Bengalis were resettled by the British into Rangunia instead. Zamindars were also encouraged to take possession of land in Rangunia. An acount of 1782 lists 43 land holders all of whom were non-Chakma. Bengalis were incentivised with rent free land of a few years until nominal rent would be collected.

== War ==
The Chakma resistance was two fold, one side being preventative of British efforts to annex, and another being offensive by attacking British held territories of the Chakmas. The king himself participated in the resistance. It was led by Raja Sher Daulat Khan and his son Jan Baksh Khan, Dewan Ranu Khan, Dewan Kono Khan, Bulob, Choori and Toothang as the principle leaders of the resistance. The British compiled documents on the resistance leaders. Dewan Ranu Khan was described as the naib of the Chakma King and Dewan of Rangunia. Konno Khan was the Chief Dewan to the Chakma King in Manikchhari near Rangamati. The Chakma fighters themselves were termed palwans (transl. fighting corps). They were activate in Rangunia and other Chakma areas. Their weaponry chiefly consisted of bows, arrows, javelins and swords. The resistance began under Ranu Khan who claimed authority as the sole Dewan of Rangunia. The Wazibul Ariz (also known as the Complaints against Raja Jan Baksh Khan and Dewan Ranu Khan) dated 26 June 1778 describes Chakma activities. The Chakma palwans first forced the Bengali settlers of Rangunia to take lease from them if they wished to remain there. They declared the British pattas as illegal and circulated their own pattas. They assured the settlers of enjoying property without hindrance from outsiders. They further demarcated the boundary of agricultural fields. They took over taxes and made new settlers pay due to the Chakma government. Zamindars raised complaints that Ranu Khan and his fighters subdue their subjects and take their tributes and assets. Woodcutters in the territory were also warned to cease harvesting of wood with one occasion where about ten to fifteen woodcutters were beheaded by the Chakmas. Grain was collected and deposited by the Chakmas from the peasants of Rangunia. Other times, the Chakmas forcibly carried away grains from the warehouses. Settlers with domesticated animals were also forced to pay the pasture taxes which was done without permission of the Chakmas nor paid out the British. Trespassing animals were ceased by the Chakma or fined. Chakma resistance fighters also levied forced labour from new settlers and used in repairing their houses and infrastructure. As a result, the Chakladar could not perform their duty and stopped showing up, nor could zamindars or proprietors. The British noted that Ranu Khan had committed great violence and forced taxes and extortions and an arrest warrant was sought for him by the Chittagong Authorities in 1777. The Chakma King meanwhile sought aid from the Kuki tribes in fighting British troops. Mr Francis Law noted in 1777 that large numbers of Kuki men from the hills were conscripted to the Chakma king's aid. The arrest warrant for Ranu Khan was dispatched by two peons and asked him to show up before the district collector. Ranu Khan however tore up the warrant and insulted the peons instead. In 1776, Francis Law required Captain Edward Ellerker to order an escort of 20 sepoys and a jemadar to assist woodcutters. However, in 1777 fifty sepoys were sent and met with resistance from the Chakmas before pursuing them and burning two to three villages.

However the expedition was not sufficient to curb Ranu Khan. To strengthen the expeditionary force in Rangunia, Captain Ellerker increased the number of sepoys by additional men. As a result 115 men were added in. Local Bengali holders sympathised with Ran Khan and his resistance. They supported the warriors with aid and support in many was. The British as a result punished all families that supported the Chakmas. In 1777, Francis Law requested Captain Ellerker to send for more men to protect the inhabitant from the Kuki incursions. Francis Law later was succeeded by Richard Sumner as district collector on 20 January 1778. Sumner remained in office until 1781 and gave Chakmas between 1778-1780 strength to increase their activities and offenses. In 1781, Sumner increased the extent of military operations in the hills and employed all out offenses against Ranu Khan. However, this expedition was not sufficient to subdue him. The British placed garrisons all over the Chakma hills as a result. The occupied area of Rangunia became too expensive to maintain for the original wealthy revenue generator it used to be. Failure to collect revenue became a major concern to Calcutta authorities. In 1782, Raja Sher Daulat Khan died. He was succeeded by his son, Jan Baksh Khan who continued the resistance ever since joining as a prince in 1776. John Buller was succeeded by Mr Irwin in 1783. A new course was pursued to peacefully settle with the Chakmas. In 1784, the government desired Mr Irwin to report whether the hillmen could not be induced by lenient measures to become peaceful subjects and cultivators in the lowlands and plains. Further military outposts were made, but none could curb the hostility effectively.

== Decline ==
Mr Irwin however preferred for a military confrontation to achieve complete submission. He heavily restricted trade into the hills and made military force against non-compliant people. The Chakmas blocked roads with logs fo woods including obstructing the Karnafuli River to prevent the mobility of British forces. A non-detailed report states that in 1785, Jan Baksh was only reduced by a battalion of sepoys commanded by British officers who pursued him to the fastness but could not be captured. The Chakma King Jan Baksh Khan went into hiding and left his capital to be occupied by British forces. The military operations, however, ended in the total military defeat of the Chakmas. The British attacked the Chakmas on all sides and encouraged them to surrender. Despite the Chakma resistance destroyed, King Jan Baksh Khan refused to accept the authority of the British. The British authorities likewise declared the Chakma throne to be vacant but did not appoint a new ruler. Despite new tax demarcations of Chakma land, the Chakmas refused to pay taxes. Furthermore, no settlement could be reached to the Chakma king. The expeditions despite suppressing the resistance fighters failed to capture the ring leaders. In 1787, at the call of Warren Hastings，Chakma King Jan Baksh Khan went to Calcutta. Both parties agreed to make peace and a treaty was made between the two.

The treaty discussed the provisions that the East India Company recognised Jan Baksh Khan as king of the Chakmas. That revenue collection was a right of the Chakma king. The British government would preserve trial autonomy migration from the plains would be restricted. The Chakma king was obligated to keep peace in his territory. British troops would remain in Chakma territories to protect roads from fierce tribes.

== Sources ==
- Qanungo, Suniti Bhushan (1998). Chakma Resistance to British Domination. Chittagong: Shanti Press.
- Chakraborty, Ratan Lal (21 July 2026). "Chakma Resistance to British Rule". The Daily Star.
