= Berhait Bazar =

- Census Town
- Location in Jharkhand, India Berhait Bazar (India)
- Coordinates: 24.887789°N 87.614242°E
- Country: India
- State: Jharkhand
- District: Sahibganj

Area
  - Total: 0.25 km^{2} (0.097 sq mi)

Population (2011)
  - Total: 4,732
  - Density: 19,000/km^{2} (49,000/sq mi)

Languages (*For language details see Barhait (community development block)#Language and religion)
  - Official: Hindi, Urdu
- Time zone: UTC+5:30 (IST)
- PIN: 816102
- Telephone/ STD code: 06426
- Lok Sabha constituency: Rajmahal
- Vidhan Sabha constituency: Barhait
- Website: sahibganj.nic.in

Berhait Bazar is a census town in the Barhait CD block in the Sahibganj subdivision of the Sahibganj district in the Indian state of Jharkhand.

== Geography ==
Cities, towns and locations in the Sahibganj, Godda and Pakur districts in Santhal Pargana Division
M: municipality, CT: census town, R: rural/ urban centre, H: historical/ religious/ tourist centre
Owing to space constraints in the small map, the actual locations in a larger map may vary slightly

=== Location ===
Berhait Bazar is located at 24.887789°N 87.614242°E.

Berhait Bazar has an area of 0.25 square kilometres (0.097 sq mi).

=== Overview ===
The map shows a hilly area with the Rajmahal hills running from the bank of the Ganges in the extreme north to the south, beyond the area covered by the map into Dumka district. ‘Farakka’ is marked on the map and that is where Farakka Barrage is, just inside West Bengal. Rajmahal coalfield is shown in the map. The area is overwhelmingly rural with only small pockets of urbanisation.

== Demographics ==
According to the 2011 Census of India, Berhait Bazar had a population of 4,732, of which 2,482 (52%) were males and 2,259 (48%) were females. Population in the age range 0–6 years was 623. The total number of literate persons in Berhait Bazar was 3,282 (79.87% of the population over 6 years).

== Infrastructure ==
According to the District Census Handbook 2011, Sahibganj, Berhait Bazar covered an area of 0.25 km^{2}. Among the civic amenities, it had 10 km roads with both open and closed drains, the protected water supply involved hand pump, R/C. It had 334 domestic electric connections, 16 road lighting points. Among the educational facilities it had 2 primary schools, the nearest secondary school (?), senior secondary school at Barharwa 20 km away (?). It had the branch office of 1 nationalised bank.

See also – Berhait Santali#Education
