= Mandro =

- Community development block
- Location in Jharkhand, India Mandro (India)
- Coordinates: 25°8′37″N 87°29′55″E
- Country: India
- State: Jharkhand
- District: Sahibganj

Government
  - Type: Federal democracy

Area
  - Total: 182.24 km^{2} (70.36 sq mi)
- Elevation: 38 m (125 ft)

Population (2011)
  - Total: 75,659
  - Density: 415.16/km^{2} (1,075.3/sq mi)

Languages
  - Official: Hindi, Urdu

Literacy (2011)
  - Total literates: 28,361 (46.03%)
- Time zone: UTC+5:30 (IST)
- Telephone/STD code: 06436
- Vehicle registration: JH 18
- Lok Sabha constituency: Rajmahal
- Vidhan Sabha constituency: Rajmahal
- Website: sahibganj.nic.in

Mandro is a community development block that forms an administrative division in the Sahibganj subdivision of the Sahibganj district, Jharkhand state, India.

== Geography ==
Mandro, the eponymous CD block headquarters, is located at 25°8′37″N 87°29′55″E.

It is located 18 km from Sahibganj, the district headquarters.

Sahebganj district may be divided into three natural divisions – (i) the hilly portion stretching from the Ganges on the north to the borders of West Bengal on the south, (ii) the uplands, undulations, long ridges and depressions, with fertile lands, and (iii) the low fertile alluvial plains lying between the hills and the Ganges, with the Sahibganj loop line passing through the narrow strip. Three rivers flowing through this region – the Ganges, Gumani and Bansloi – make the plains rich and cultivable.

Mandro CD block is bounded by Sahibganj CD block on the north, Borio CD block on the east, Boarijore CD block in Godda district on the south, Thakurgangti CD block in Godda district and Sonhaula and Colgong CD blocks in Bhagalpur district of Bihar on the west.

Mandro CD block has an area of 182.24 km^{2}.Mirzachauki police station serves this block. Headquarters of this CD block is at Mandro village.

Mandro CD block has 228 gram panchayats, 179 inhabited (chiragi) and 49 uninhabited (bechiragi) villages.

== Demographics ==
=== Population ===
According to the 2011 Census of India, Mandro CD block had a total population of 75,659, all of which were rural. There were 38,114 (50%) males and 37,545 (50%) females. Population in the age range 0–6 years was 14,042. Scheduled Castes numbered 3,140 (4.15%) and Scheduled Tribes numbered 41,176 (54.42%).

Mandro Damin Bazar had a population of 1,178 in 2011.

=== Literacy ===
According to the 2011 census, the total number of literate persons in Mandro CD block was 28,361 (46.03% of the population over 6 years) out of which 17,373 (61%) were males and 10,988 (39%) were females. The gender disparity (the difference between female and male literacy rates) was 22%.

See also – List of Jharkhand districts ranked by literacy rate

Literacy in CD Blocks of
Sahibganj district
Sahibganj subdivision
Sahibganj – 56.07%
Mandro – 46.03%
Borio – 42.38%
Barhait – 42.50%
Rajmahal subdivision
Taljhari – 47.74%
Rajmahal – 51.28%
Udhwa – 47.71%
Pathna – 47.71%
Barharwa – 58.54%
Source: 2011 Census: CD Block Wise
Primary Census Abstract Data

=== Language and religion ===
Religions in Mandro Block (2011)
Religion	Percent
Hinduism	57.16%
Islam	20.24%
Christianity	15.73%
Sarna	6.18%
Other or not stated	0.69%

Hindus are the majority community. Muslims and Christians are two minority communities. In 2001, Hindus were 60.68% of the population, Muslims 16.94%, Christians 15.78% and other religions 6.47% of the population.

Languages of Mandro block (2011)
1. Santali (45.7%)
2. Urdu (13.9%)
3. 'Other' Hindi (12.6%)
4. Bhojpuri (7.41%)
5. Hindi (6.85%)
6. Malto (6.79%)
7. Khortha (2.49%)
8. Kurmali (2.21%)
9. Bengali (1.45%)
10. Others (0.61%)

At the time of the 2011 census, 45.68% of the population spoke Santali, 13.88% Urdu, 7.41% Bhojpuri, 6.85% Hindi, 6.79% Malto, 2.49% Khortha, 2.21% Kurmali and 1.45% Bengali as their first language. 12.63% of the population spoke languages classified as 'Others' under Hindi. The dialect of the region is Angika.

== Rural poverty ==
50-60% of the population of Sahibganj district were in the BPL category in 2004–2005, being in the same category as Pakur, Deoghar and Garhwa districts."Based on the number of the total rural households in Census 2011 and BPL Revision Survey of 2010-11 the percentage of BPL households in rural areas is 86.03 percent." Rural poverty in Jharkhand declined from 66% in 1993–94 to 46% in 2004–05. In 2011, it has come down to 39.1%.

== Economy ==
=== Livelihood ===
Livelihood
in Mandro CD block
1. Cultivators (27.2%)
2. Agricultural labourers (36.7%)
3. Household industries (9.30%)
4. Other Workers (26.9%)

In Mandro CD block in 2011, amongst the class of total workers, cultivators numbered 9,427 and formed 27.16%, agricultural labourers numbered 12,732 and formed 36.68%, household industry workers numbered 3,227 and formed 9.30% and other workers numbered 9,324 and formed 26.86%. Total workers numbered 34,710 and formed 45.88% of the total population. Non-workers numbered 40,949 and formed 54.12% of total population.

Note: In the census records a person is considered a cultivator, if the person is engaged in cultivation/ supervision of land owned. When a person who works on another person's land for wages in cash or kind or share, is regarded as an agricultural labourer. Household industry is defined as an industry conducted by one or more members of the family within the household or village, and one that does not qualify for registration as a factory under the Factories Act. Other workers are persons engaged in some economic activity other than cultivators, agricultural labourers and household workers. It includes factory, mining, plantation, transport and office workers, those engaged in business and commerce, teachers and entertainment artistes.

=== Infrastructure ===
There are 184 inhabited villages in Mandro CD block. In 2011, 14 villages had power supply. 13 villages had tap water (treated/ untreated), 167 villages had well water (covered/ uncovered), 55 villages had hand pumps, and all villages had drinking water facility. 3 village had post offices, 5 villages had sub post offices, 4 villages had telephones (land lines), 3 villages had public call offices and 22 villages had mobile phone coverage. 152 villages had pucca (paved) roads, 7 villages had bus service (private/public), 2 villages had auto/ modified auto, 4 villages had taxis/ vans, 38 villages had tractors, 3 villages had navigable waterways. 9 villages had bank branches, 1 village had ATMs, 4 villages had agricultural credit societies, 4 village had cinema/ video hall, 1 village had public library and public reading room. 29 villages had public distribution system, 9 villages had weekly haat (market) and 40 villages had assembly polling stations.

=== Agriculture ===
A large part of Sahibganj district is hilly and most of the thick forests are gone. Some of the plains are cultivable. The livelihood scenario presented above indicates that a large population depends on agriculture. In Mandro CD block 57.46% of the total area is cultivable area and 13.58% of the cultivable area is irrigated area.

=== Backward Regions Grant Fund ===
Sahibganj district is listed as a backward region and receives financial support from the Backward Regions Grant Fund. The fund created by the Government of India is designed to redress regional imbalances in development. As of 2012, 272 districts across the country were listed under this scheme. The list includes 21 districts of Jharkhand.

== Tourism ==
Teliagarhi is a hill pass, with the ruins of a fort, that was known as the gateway of Bengal, and played an important part in history.

== Education ==
Mandro CD block had 58 villages with pre-primary schools, 116 villages with primary schools, 42 villages with middle schools, 4 villages with secondary schools, 67 villages with no educational facility.

== Healthcare ==
Mandro CD block had 7 villages with primary health centres, 23 villages with primary health subcentres, 3 village with maternity and child welfare centre, 1 village with TB clinic, 2 villages with allopathic hospitals, 3 villages with dispensaries, 1 village with veterinary hospital, 3 villages with family welfare centres, 25 villages with medicine shops.
.*Private medical practitioners, alternative medicine etc. not included
