= Teliagarhi =

Teliagarhi Teliagarih
- Village
- Location in Jharkhand, India Teliagarhi (India)
- Coordinates: 25.261021°N 87.538511°E
- Country: India
- State: Jharkhand
- District: Sahibganj

Population (2011)
  - Total: 107

Languages (*For language details see Mandro#Language and religion)
  - Official: Hindi, Urdu
- Time zone: UTC+5:30 (IST)
- Telephone/ STD code: 06436
- Lok Sabha constituency: Rajmahal
- Vidhan Sabha constituency: Rajmahal
- Website: sahibganj.nic.in

Teliagarhi (also written as Teliagarih) is a village in Mandro CD block in Sahibganj subdivision of Sahibganj district in the Indian state of Jharkhand.

== History ==
Teliagarhi became the main gateway for Muslim armies coming from northern India and marching to Bengal from the 13th century. Bakhtiyar Khilji passed through Teliagarhi pass on the way to the conquest of Bengal. In 1538, Sher Shah Suri and Humayun fought a decisive battle near Teliagarhi. The rebellious Prince Khurram fought with Ibrahim Khan at Teliagarhi and Rajmahal for control of Bengal.

Teliagarhi fort was built by a Teli zamindar Raja Dario Ji Sahu.The Teli Jamindar was the devotee of Maa Raksistha And built a Maa Raksisthan temple was built near the fort in 1819.

== Geography ==
Cities, towns and locations in the Sahibganj, Godda and Pakur districts in Santhal Pargana Division
M: municipality, CT: census town, R: rural/ urban centre, H: historical/ religious/ tourist centre
Owing to space constraints in the small map, the actual locations in a larger map may vary slightly

=== Location ===
Teliagarhi is located at 25.261021°N 87.53861°E.

Teliagarih has an area of 31 hectares (77 acres).

=== Overview ===
The map shows a hilly area with the Rajmahal hills running from the bank of the Ganges in the extreme north to south, beyond the area covered by the map into Dumka district. ‘Farakka’ is marked on the map and that is where Farakka Barrage is, just inside West Bengal. Rajmahal coalfield is shown in the map. The entire area is overwhelmingly rural with only small pockets of urbanisation.

Note: Full-screen map has additional features. All places marked on the map are linked, and you can easily move on to the page of your choice.

== Demographics ==
According to the 2011 Census of India, Teliagarih had a total population of 107, of which 58 (54%) were males and 49 (46%) were females. Population in the age range 0–6 years was 19. The total number of literate persons in Teliagarih was 46 (52.27% of the population over 6 years).

== Transport ==
Karamtola railway station, located nearby, situated on the Sahibganj Loop, 9 km from Sahibganj.
