= Mirzachauki =

- Village
- Location in Jharkhand, India Mirzachauki (India)
- Coordinates: 25.253911°N 87.495411°E
- Country: India
- State: Jharkhand
- District: Sahibganj

Population (2011)
  - Total: 248

Languages (*For language details see Mandro#Language and religion)
  - Official: Hindi, Urdu
- Time zone: UTC+5:30 (IST)
- PIN: 813208 (Mandro)
- Telephone/ STD code: 06436
- Lok Sabha constituency: Rajmahal
- Vidhan Sabha constituency: Rajmahal
- Website: sahibganj.nic.in

Mirzachauki is a village in the Mandro CD block in the Sahibganj subdivision of the Sahibganj district in the Indian state of Jharkhand.

== Geography ==
Cities, towns and locations in the Sahibganj, Godda and Pakur districts in Santhal Pargana Division
M: municipality, CT: census town, R: rural/ urban centre, H: historical/ religious/ tourist centre
Owing to space constraints in the small map, the actual locations in a larger map may vary slightly

=== Location ===
Mirzachauki is located at 25.263911°N 87.495411°E.

Mirzachauki has an area of 72 hectares (180 acres).

=== Overview ===
The map shows a hilly area with the Rajmahal hills running from the bank of the Ganges in the extreme north to the south, beyond the area covered by the map into Dumka district. ‘Farakka’ is marked on the map and that is where Farakka Barrage is, just inside West Bengal. Rajmahal coalfield is shown in the map. The area is overwhelmingly rural with only small pockets of urbanisation.

== Demographics ==
According to the 2011 Census of India, Mirzachauki had a total population of 248, of which 121 (49%) were males and 127 (51%) were females. Population in the age range 0–6 years was 42. The total number of literate persons in Mirzachauki was 79 (38.35% of the population over 6 years of age).

== Civic administration ==
=== Police station ===
Mirzachauki police station serves the Mandro CD block.

== Transport ==
There is a station at Mirzachauki on the Sahibganj Loop.

== Education ==
Government High School Mirzachowki is a Hindi-medium coeducational institution established in 1954. It has facilities for teaching from class I to class X.

Gandhi Adarsh High School Mirzachowki is a Hindi-medium coeducational institution established in 1985. It has facilities for teaching from class VI to class X.
