= Sahibganj (community development block) =

- Community development block
- Location in Jharkhand, India Sahibganj (India)
- Coordinates: 25°14′25″N 87°38′4″E
- Country: India
- State: Jharkhand
- District: Sahibganj

Government
  - Type: Federal democracy

Area
  - Total: 168.16 km^{2} (64.93 sq mi)
- Elevation: 38 m (125 ft)

Population (2011)
  - Total: 162,120
  - Density: 964.08/km^{2} (2,497.0/sq mi)

Languages
  - Official: Hindi, Urdu

Literacy (2011)
  - Total literates: 32,379 (56.07%)
- Time zone: UTC+5:30 (IST)
- PIN: 816109 (Sahibganj)
- Telephone/STD code: 06436
- Vehicle registration: JH 18
- Lok Sabha constituency: Rajmahal
- Vidhan Sabha constituency: Rajmahal
- Website: sahibganj.nic.in

Sahibganj is a community development block that forms an administrative division in the Sahibganj subdivision of the Sahibganj district, Jharkhand state, India.

== Geography ==
Sahibganj, the eponymous CD block headquarters, is located at 25°14′25″N 87°38′4″E.

Sahebganj district may be divided into three natural divisions – (i) the hilly portion stretching from the Ganges on the north to the borders of West Bengal on the south, (ii) the uplands, undulations, long ridges and depressions, with fertile lands, and (iii) the low fertile alluvial plains lying between the hills and the Ganges, with the Sahibganj loop line passing through the narrow strip. Three rivers flowing through this region – the Ganges, Gumani and Bansloi - make the plains rich and cultivable.

Sahibganj CD block is bounded by Manihari and Amdabad CD blocks in Katihar district of Bihar, across the Ganges, on the north, Rajmahal CD block on the east, Taljhari, Borio and Mandro CD blocks on the south, and Pirpainti CD block in Bhagalpur district of Bihar on the west.

Sahibganj CD block has an area of 168.16 km^{2}.Sahibganj Town and Sahibganj Mufasil police stations serve this block. Headquarters of this CD block is at Sahebganj town.

Sahibganj CD block has 32 gram panchayats, 23 inhabited (chiragi) and 9 uninhabited (bechiragi) villages.

== Demographics ==
=== Population ===
According to the 2011 Census of India, Sahibganj CD block had a total population of 162,120, of which 73,906 (45.59%) were rural and 88,214 (54.41%) urban. There were 85,724 (52.88%) males and 76,396 (47.12%) females. Population in the age range 0–6 years was 28,416. Scheduled Castes numbered 16,426 (10.13%) and Scheduled Tribes numbered 14,058 (8.67%).

Sahibganj CD block had several villages with a high population (2011 census population figures in brackets): Sakrigali River Block (3,733), Ganga Parshad (28,844), Makhmalpur (10,517), Hajipur (9,023) and Harparshad Ogariah (4,676).

=== Literacy ===
According to the 2011 census, the total number of literate persons in the Sahibganj CD block was 32,379 (56.07% of the population over 6 years) out of which 19,981 (62%) were males and 12,398 (38%) were females. The gender disparity (the difference between female and male literacy rates) was 24%.

See also – List of Jharkhand districts ranked by literacy rate

Literacy in CD Blocks of
Sahibganj district
Sahibganj subdivision
Sahibganj – 56.07%
Mandro – 46.03%
Borio – 42.38%
Barhait – 42.50%
Rajmahal subdivision
Taljhari – 47.74%
Rajmahal – 51.28%
Udhwa – 47.71%
Pathna – 47.71%
Barharwa – 58.54%
Source: 2011 Census: CD Block Wise
Primary Census Abstract Data

=== Language and religion ===
Religions in Sahibganj Block (2011)
Religion	Percent
Hinduism	75.01%
Islam	23.90%
Christianity	0.66%
Other or not stated	0.43%

Hindus are the majority community, forming 75.01% of the population. Muslims are a significant minority with 23.90%. In 2001, Hindus were 75.90% and Muslims 23.26% of the population respectively.

Languages of Sahibganj CD block (2011)
1. Hindi (30.9%)
2. Bhojpuri (23.0%)
3. 'Other' Hindi (17.2%)
4. Urdu (17.0%)
5. Bengali (5.46%)
6. Khortha (3.02%)
7. Others (3.36%)

At the time of the 2011 census, 30.87% of the population spoke Hindi, 23.00% Bhojpuri, 17.04% Urdu, 5.46% Bengali and 3.02% Khortha as their first language. 17.25% of the population spoke languages recorded as 'Other' under Hindi. The local dialect is Angika.

== Rural poverty ==
50-60% of the population of Sahibganj district were in the BPL category in 2004–2005, being in the same category as Pakur, Deoghar and Garhwa districts. "Based on the number of the total rural households in Census 2011 and BPL Revision Survey of 2010-11 the percentage of BPL households in rural areas is 86.03 percent." Rural poverty in Jharkhand declined from 66% in 1993–94 to 46% in 2004–05. In 2011, it has come down to 39.1%.

== Economy ==
=== Livelihood ===
Livelihood
in Sahibganj CD block
1. Cultivators (13.9%)
2. Agricultural labourers (51.7%)
3. Household industries (2.74%)
4. Other Workers (31.6%)

In Sahibganj CD block in 2011, amongst the class of total workers, cultivators numbered 3,414 and formed 13.90%, agricultural labourers numbered 12,705 and formed 51.74%, household industry workers numbered 672 and formed 2.74% and other workers numbered 7,763 and formed 31.62%. Total workers numbered 24,554 and formed 33.32% of the total population. Non-workers numbered 49,352 and formed 68.78% of total population.

Note: In the census records a person is considered a cultivator, if the person is engaged in cultivation/ supervision of land owned. When a person who works on another person's land for wages in cash or kind or share, is regarded as an agricultural labourer. Household industry is defined as an industry conducted by one or more members of the family within the household or village, and one that does not qualify for registration as a factory under the Factories Act. Other workers are persons engaged in some economic activity other than cultivators, agricultural labourers and household workers. It includes factory, mining, plantation, transport and office workers, those engaged in business and commerce, teachers and entertainment artistes.

=== Infrastructure ===
There are 21 inhabited villages in Sahibganj CD block. In 2011, 10 villages had power supply. 20 villages had hand pumps, and all villages had drinking water facility. 1 village had post office, 4 villages had sub post offices, 3 villages had telephones (land lines), 3 villages had public call offices and 12 villages had mobile phone coverage. 18 villages had pucca (paved) roads, 2 villages had bus service (private/public), 1 village had auto/ modified auto, 3 villages had taxis/ vans, 11 villages had tractors, 6 villages had navigable waterways. 2 villages had bank branches, 1 village had ATMs. 8 villages had public distribution system, 3 villages had weekly haat (market) and 4 villages had assembly polling stations.

=== Agriculture ===
A large part of Sahibganj district is hilly and most of the thick forests are gone. Some of the plains are cultivable. The livelihood scenario presented above indicates that a large population depends on agriculture. In Sahibganj CD block 56.32% of the total area is cultivable area and 13.54% of the cultivable area is irrigated area.

=== Backward Regions Grant Fund ===
Sahibganj district is listed as a backward region and receives financial support from the Backward Regions Grant Fund. The fund created by the Government of India is designed to redress regional imbalances in development. As of 2012, 272 districts across the country were listed under this scheme. The list includes 21 districts of Jharkhand.

== Transport ==
The Khana Junction-Rajmahal section of the Sahibganj Loop was complete in October 1859 and the first train ran from Howrah to Rajmahal via Khana on 4 July 1860.

== Education ==
Sahibganj CD block had 10 villages with pre-primary schools, 14 villages with primary schools, 9 villages with middle schools, 1 village with secondary school, 1 village with senior secondary school, 5 villages with no educational facility.
*Senior secondary schools are also known as Inter colleges in Jharkhand

== Healthcare ==
Sahibganj CD block had 2 villages with primary health centres, 2 villages with primary health subcentres, 1 village with family welfare centre, 1 village with medicine shop.
.*Private medical practitioners, alternative medicine etc. not included
