= Patna massacre of 1763 =

Massacre in India

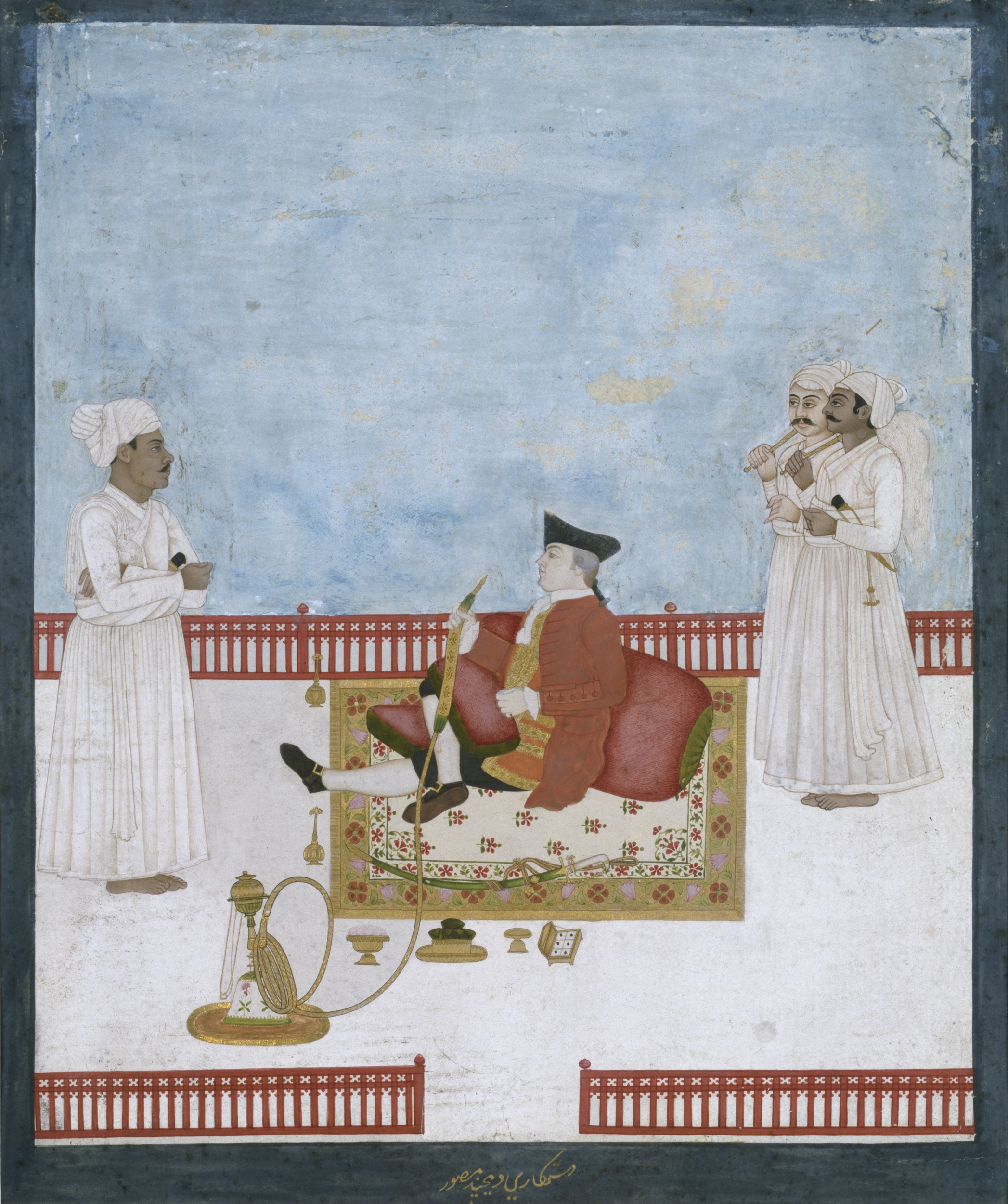
A possible portrait of William Fullerton, who survived the massacre

The Patna massacre of 1763 was the mass killing of 45 mainly British employees of the East India Company on 6 October 1763, in Patna, India, on the order of Nawab Mir Qasim. These men had been imprisoned by Mir Qasim since William Ellis' failed attempt to seize Patna for the East India Company on 25 June the same year. Following Mir Qasim's defeat, a pillar was erected over the site of the well into which their bodies were thrown and over the houses where the massacre was committed, but nowadays a hospital stands where the monument used to be.

200 Indian sepoys, previously in the pay of the East India Company, and also imprisoned after the failed seizure of Patna and its aftermath, were also killed for refusing to join the ranks of Mir Qasim, though they are not traditionally included in the massacre narrative. William Fullerton, a Scottish surgeon of the East India Company, survived the Patna Massacre due to the intercession of Ghulam Hussain Khan,
