= Barhait (community development block) =

- Community development block
- Location in Jharkhand Barhait (India)
- Coordinates: 24°53′20″N 87°36′26″E
- Country: India
- State: Jharkhand
- District: Sahibganj

Government
  - Type: Federal democracy

Area
  - Total: 370.98 km^{2} (143.24 sq mi)
- Elevation: 38 m (125 ft)

Population (2011)
  - Total: 130,227
  - Density: 351.04/km^{2} (909.18/sq mi)

Languages
  - Official: Hindi, Urdu

Literacy (2011)
  - Total literates: 45,188 (42.50%)
- Time zone: UTC+5:30 (IST)
- PIN: 816102 (Barhait)
- Telephone/STD code: 06426
- Vehicle registration: JH 18
- Lok Sabha constituency: Rajmahal
- Vidhan Sabha constituency: Barhait
- Website: sahibganj.nic.in

Barhait is a community development block that forms an administrative division in the Sahibganj subdivision of the Sahibganj district, Jharkhand state, India.

== Geography ==
Barhait, the eponymous CD block headquarters, is located at 24°53′20″N 87°36′26″E.

It is located 45 km from Sahibganj, the district headquarters.

Sahebganj district may be divided into three natural divisions – (i) the hilly portion stretching from the Ganges on the north to the borders of West Bengal on the south, (ii) the uplands, undulations, long ridges and depressions, with fertile lands, and (iii) the low fertile alluvial plains lying between the hills and the Ganges, with the Sahibganj loop line passing through the narrow strip. Three rivers flowing through this region – the Ganges, Gumani and Bansloi – make the plains rich and cultivable.

The Santhal Pargana division has about 5,120 square kilometres (1,980 sq mi) hilly tract, out of which about 3,471 square kilometres (1,340 sq mi) is in Damin-i-koh, which is spread across Sahibganj, Godda and Dumka districts, a major portion being in Sahibganj district. The Borio, Barhait, Taljhari and Pathana CD blocks of Sahibganj district are in the Damin-i-koh tract. Dense forests once covering the hills slopes have thinned out. Paddy is produced in the valleys. Barbatti and maize are grown in the hill area. Paharias, Mal Paharias and Santals generally inhabit the area.

Barhait CD block is bounded by Borio and Taljhari CD blocks on the north, Pathna CD block on the east, Littipara block in Pakur district on the south, and Sunderpahari and Boarijore CD blocks in Godda district on the west.

Barhait CD block has an area of 370.98 km^{2}.Barhait police station serves this block. Headquarters of this CD block is at Barhait village.

Barhait CD block has 190 inhabited (chiragi) and 85 uninhabited (bechiragi) villages.

== Demographics ==
=== Population ===
According to the 2011 Census of India, Barhait CD block had a total population of 130,227, of which 115,742 were rural and 14,485 were urban. There were 66,401 (51%) males and 63,826 (49%) females. Population in the age range 0–6 years was 23,895. Scheduled Castes numbered 5,525 (4.24%) and Scheduled Tribes numbered 70,233 (53.93%).

In the 2011 census, two census towns were shown in Barhait CD block (2011 census population in brackets): Berhait Santali (9,753) and Berhait Bazar (4,732).

=== Literacy ===
According to the 2011 census, the total number of literates persons in Barhait CD block was 45,188 (42.50% of the population over 6 years) out of which 28,413 (63%) were males and 16,775 (37%) were females. The gender disparity (the difference between female and male literacy rates) was 26%.

See also – List of Jharkhand districts ranked by literacy rate

Literacy in CD Blocks of
Sahibganj district
Sahibganj subdivision
Sahibganj – 56.07%
Mandro – 46.03%
Borio – 42.38%
Barhait – 42.50%
Rajmahal subdivision
Taljhari – 47.74%
Rajmahal – 51.28%
Udhwa – 47.71%
Pathna – 47.71%
Barharwa – 58.54%
Source: 2011 Census: CD Block Wise
Primary Census Abstract Data

=== Language and religion ===
Religions in Barhait Block (2011)
| Religion | Percent |
| Hinduism | 57.72% |
| Islam | 20.20% |
| Christianity | 15.14% |
| Sarna | 6.60% |
| Other or not stated | 0.33% |

Hindus are the majority community. Muslims and Christians and Sarna are each a minority community. In 2001, Hindus were 55.81%, Muslims 18.38%, Christians 11.42% and Sarna followers 14.19% of the population respectively.

Languages of Barhait block (2011)
1. Santali (45.4%)
2. Khortha (29.1%)
3. Malto (8.33%)
4. Bengali (5.30%)
5. Urdu (4.64%)
6. Hindi (2.90%)
7. Bhojpuri (2.22%)
8. Kurmali (1.35%)
9. Others (0.78%)

At the time of the 2011 census, 45.43% of the population spoke Santali, 29.05% Khortha, 8.33% Malto, 5.30% Bengali, 4.64% Urdu, 2.90% Hindi, 2.22% Bhojpuri and 1.35% Kurmali as their first language.

== Rural poverty ==
50-60% of the population of Sahibganj district were in the BPL category in 2004–2005, being in the same category as Pakur, Deoghar and Garhwa districts."Based on the number of the total rural households in Census 2011 and BPL Revision Survey of 2010-11 the percentage of BPL households in rural areas is 86.03 percent." Rural poverty in Jharkhand declined from 66% in 1993–94 to 46% in 2004–05. In 2011, it has come down to 39.1%.

== Economy ==
=== Livelihood ===
Livelihood
in Barhait CD block
1. Cultivators (37.9%)
2. Agricultural labourers (51.6%)
3. Household industries (1.79%)
4. Other Workers (8.71%)

In Barhait CD block in 2011, amongst the class of total workers, cultivators numbered 23,000 and formed 37.88%, agricultural labourers numbered 31,348 and formed 51.62%, household industry workers numbered 1,086 and formed 1.79% and other workers numbered 5,292 and formed 8.71%. Total workers numbered 65,024 and formed 49.93% of the total population. Non-workers numbered 65,203 and formed 50.07% of total population.

Note: In the census records a person is considered a cultivator, if the person is engaged in cultivation/ supervision of land owned. When a person who works on another person's land for wages in cash or kind or share, is regarded as an agricultural labourer. Household industry is defined as an industry conducted by one or more members of the family within the household or village, and one that does not qualify for registration as a factory under the Factories Act. Other workers are persons engaged in some economic activity other than cultivators, agricultural labourers and household workers. It includes factory, mining, plantation, transport and office workers, those engaged in business and commerce, teachers and entertainment artistes.

=== Infrastructure ===
There are 199 inhabited villages in Barhait CD block. In 2011, 3 villages had power supply. 5 villages had tap water (treated/ untreated), 194 villages had well water (covered/ uncovered), 136 villages had hand pumps, and all villages had drinking water facility. 12 village had post offices, 10 villages had sub post offices, 1 village had telephones (land lines), 3 villages had public call offices and 96 villages had mobile phone coverage. 157 villages had pucca (paved) roads, 27 villages had bus service (private/public), 4 villages had auto/ modified auto, 5 villages had taxis/ vans, 13 villages had tractors, 4 villages had navigable waterways. 7 villages had bank branches, 3 villages had ATMs, 9 villages had agricultural credit societies, 2 villages had cinema/ video hall, 2 villages had public library and public reading room. 75 villages had public distribution system, 11 villages had weekly haat (market) and 56 villages had assembly polling stations.

=== Agriculture ===
A large part of Sahibganj district is hilly and most of the thick forests are gone. Some of the plains are cultivable. The livelihood scenario presented above indicates that a large population depends on agriculture. In Barhait CD block 19.62% of the total area is cultivable area and 3.53% of the cultivable area is irrigated area.

=== Backward Regions Grant Fund ===
Sahibganj district is listed as a backward region and receives financial support from the Backward Regions Grant Fund. The fund created by the Government of India is designed to redress regional imbalances in development. As of 2012, 272 districts across the country were listed under this scheme. The list includes 21 districts of Jharkhand.

== Education ==
Barhait CD block had 12 villages with pre-primary schools, 129 villages with primary schools, 33 villages with middle schools, 2 villages with secondary schools, 67 villages with no educational facility.

== Healthcare ==
Barhait CD block had 1 village with primary health centre, 4 villages with primary health subcentres, 1 village with maternity and child welfare centre, 113 villages with medicine shops.
.*Private medical practitioners, alternative medicine etc. not included
