= Ganga Parshad =

Village in Jharkhand, India

- Village
- Location within Jharkhand Location within India
- Coordinates: 25°15′15″N 87°35′26″E
- Country: India
- State: Jharkhand
- District: Sahibganj
- Block: Sahibganj

Government
  - Type: Village Panchayat

Area
  - Total: 25.58 km^{2} (9.88 sq mi)
- Elevation: 74 m (243 ft)

Population (2011)
  - Total: 24,844
  - Density: 971.2/km^{2} (2,515/sq mi)

Languages
  - Official: Hindi
- Time zone: UTC+5:30 (IST)
- PIN: 816109
- STD code: 06436
- Vehicle registration: JH-18

Ganga Parshad is a village in the suburb of Sahibganj, Sahibganj District, Jharkhand, India. It is located near the state border with Bihar, about 6 kilometres west of the urban center of Sahebganj. In 2011, it had a population of 24,844.

== Geography ==
Ganga Parshad is located on the south of Ganges River. The National Highway 33 passes through the town. The average elevation of the town is 74 metres above the sea level.

== Demographics ==
According to the 2011 Census of India, there are 4,580 households within Ganga Parshad. Among the 24,844 inhabitants, 13,280 are male and 11,564 are female. The total literacy rate is 45.58%, with 7,053 of the male residents and 4,271 of the female residents being literate. The town's census location code is 357937.
