= Sahibganj subdivision =

- Subdivision
- Location in Jharkhand, India Sahibganj subdivision (India)
- Coordinates: 25.25°N 87.65°E
- Country: India
- State: Jharkhand
- District: Sahibganj
- Headquarters: Sahebganj

Area
  - Total: 1,117.39 km^{2} (431.43 sq mi)

Population
  - Total: 465,851
  - Density: 416.910/km^{2} (1,079.79/sq mi)

Languages
  - Official: Hindi, Urdu
- Time zone: UTC+5:30 (IST)
- Website: sahibganj.nic.in

Sahibganj subdivision is an administrative subdivision of the Sahibganj district in the Santhal Pargana division in the state of Jharkhand, India.

== History ==
As a result of the Santhal rebellion, Act XXXVII of 1855 was passed by the British Raj, and a separate district called Santhal Pargana was carved out of parts of Birbhum and Bhagalpur districts. Santhal Pargana had four sub-districts – Dumka, Godda, Deoghar and Rajmahal. Subsequently, Santal Pargana district comprised Dumka, Deoghar, Sahibganj, Godda, Pakur and Jamtara sub-divisions. In 1983 Deoghar, Sahibganj and Godda subdivisions were given district status.

== Administrative set up ==
Sahibganj district has two subdivisions: Sahibganj and Rajmahal. Sahibganj, Mandro, Borio and Barheit community development blocks and Sahebganj town are in Sahibganj subdivision.

Sahibganj district has two subdivisions:

Subdivision	Headquarters	Area km^{2}	Population (2011)	Rural population % (2011)	Urban population % (2011)
Sahibganj	Sahebganj	1,117.39	465,851	76.46	23.54
Rajmahal	Rajmahal	994.84	684,716	92.70	7.30

Cities, towns and locations in the Sahibganj, Godda and Pakur districts in Santhal Pargana Division
M: municipality, CT: census town, R: rural/ urban centre, H: historical/ religious/ tourist centre
Owing to space constraints in the small map, the actual locations in a larger map may vary slightly

== Demographics ==
According to the 2011 Census of India data, Sahibganj subdivision, in Sahibganj district, had a total population of 465,851. There were 239,473 (51%) males and 226,378 (49%) females. Scheduled castes numbered 27,567 (5.92%) and scheduled tribes numbered 185,199 (39.75%). Literacy rate was 42.93%.

See also – List of Jharkhand districts ranked by literacy rate

== Police stations ==
Police stations in Sahibganj subdivision are at:

1. Town
2. Muffasil
3. Mirzachauki
4. Barhait
5. Borio

== Blocks ==
Community development blocks in Sahibganj subdivision are:

CD Block	Headquarters	Area km^{2}	Population (2011)	SC %	ST %	Literacy rate %	CT
Sahibganj	Sahebganj	168.16	73,906	7.20	11.84	56.07	-
Mandro	Mandro	182.24	75,659	4.15	54.42	46.03	-
Borio	Borio	391.76	97,845	2.53	61.05	42.38	Borio
Barhait	Barhait	370.98	130,227	4.24	53.93	42.50	Berhait Santali, Berhait Bazar

== Education ==
In 2011, in the CD blocks of Sahibganj subdivision out of a total 672 inhabited villages there were 116 villages with pre-primary schools, 431 villages with primary schools, 150 villages with middle schools, 15 villages with secondary schools, 5 villages with senior secondary schools, 1 village with vocational training school/ ITI, 233 villages with no educational facility.
.*Senior secondary schools are also known as Inter colleges in Jharkhand

=== Educational facilities ===
(Information about degree colleges with proper reference may be added here)

== Healthcare ==
In 2011, in the CD blocks of Sahibganj subdivision there were 12 villages with primary health centres, 40 villages with primary health subcentres, 6 villages with maternity and child welfare centres, 7 villages with allopathic hospitals, 7 villages with dispensaries, 1 village with veterinary hospital, 8 villages with family welfare centres, 160 villages with medicine shops.
.*Private medical practitioners, alternative medicine etc. not included

=== Medical facilities ===
(Anybody having referenced information about location of government/ private medical facilities may please add it here)
