= Gurgin Khan (Bengal) =

Armenian merchant and military leader (died 1763)

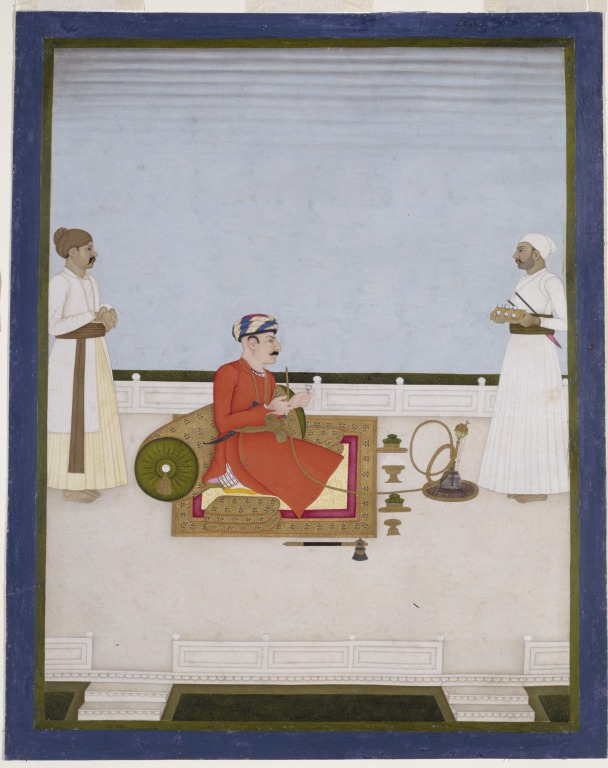
- An eighteenth-century painting of an officer, probably Gurgin Khan (seated)
- Native name: Grigor Harutiunian
- Died: 1763 Bengal Subah
- Allegiance: Bengal Subah (Mughal Empire)
- Service years: 18th century
- Rank: General
- Commands: Bengal army under Mir Qasim
- Conflicts: Battle of Udhwa Nala; Conflicts with the British East India Company

Khoja Gregory (Note: Grigor Harutiunian (Armenian: Գրիգոր Հարությունյան) in Armenian. Khoja is an honorific title which was used by Armenian merchants.) (died August 1763), better known as Gurgin Khan, was an Armenian merchant and military leader who served Mir Qasim, the Nawab of Bengal from 1760 to 1764, as minister of war and commander-in-chief. He was responsible for reforming the nawab's army along European lines. He was assassinated under unclear circumstances—possibly on Mir Qasim's orders—during the nawab's conflict with the British.

== Biography ==
Khoja Gregory was born in the Erivan quarter of New Julfa, an Armenian suburb of Isfahan and the center of an extensive merchant network. He had two brothers, Khoja Petrus and Khoja Barsick Arathoon, who were both also merchants in Bengal. Gregory is said to have worked as a cloth merchant in Hooghly. He is described by Raymond, a French Creole who met him, as having "a remarkable physiognomy. His height was above the average. He had fair complexion, large and black fiery eyes, arched eyebrows that were joined in the middle and an aquiline nose with a ridge in the middle of its length." He may have come to know Mir Qasim through his brother Petrus, who was involved in politics in Bengal. According to Mesrovb Jacob Seth, he was already close to Mir Qasim before the latter became Nawab of Bengal in 1760. He was appointed commander-in-chief of the nawab's army and renamed Gurgin Khan after Mir Qasim's enthronement. Many contemporaries were surprised by the appointment of an Armenian merchant to the post of commander-in-chief.

One of Mir Qasim's main goals was to reform his military in order to increase his independence and check the growing power of the British East India Company. Gurgin Khan organized these reforms, gradually replacing the nawab's old standing army with new troops recruited according to higher standards. He personally took charge of the artillery and organized the artillery and musketeers along European lines. A factory was set up at Monghyr for the production of guns and muskets; munitions imported by Europeans were also available for purchase. It appears that Gurgin Khan personally arranged the acquisition of European munitions with the help of his brother Petrus, who was closely connected with the British.

According to contemporary sources, Gurgin Khan was an intelligent, prudent, and loyal advisor to Mir Qasim who tempered the nawab's eagerness to start a war with the British, urging him to wait until the time was ripe. The nawab is said to have greatly relied on his advice. In 1763, Gurgin Khan led his forces on a campaign against Nepal in order to test the effectiveness of the newly reformed troops and artillery. After an initial victory, his troops were routed by a Nepalese nighttime attack. According to the hostile account of Ghulam Hussain Khan Tabatabai, Gurgin was greatly shocked and ashamed after this defeat and had to be persuaded by another officer of Mir Qasim to return to the camp of the nawab. After the British seizure of Patna later in 1763, Gurgin Khan sent troops to assist the local governor. Patna was successfully recaptured. However, this was followed by a string of defeats for the nawab's generals. Gurgin Khan declined to personally take charge of the defense of Udhuanala, stating that he could not leave the nawab in this chaotic situation; in fact, neither Gurgin Khan nor Mir Qasim were present at any of the battles fought with the British. Bhaswati Bhattacharya suggests that Gurgin Khan may have wanted to avoid facing defeat against the British, having seen in Nepal that the nawab's army was not ready for such a confrontation. While he is described as a "military genius" by all contemporary sources except Ghulam Hussain, he lacked experience. The lack of a commander-in-chief in the field, as well as the divisions within the nawab's army, prevented the Mughal forces from acting in unison.

In August 1763, Gurgin Khan was assassinated outside his tent in the nawab's camp while traveling from Monghyr to Patna after the Battle of Udhuanala. According to Ghulam Hussain's eyewitness account, he was killed by two or three Mughal horsemen who approached him on the pretense of asking about their pay. Jean Baptiste Joseph Gentil, a French officer in the nawab's service and a friend of Gurgin, writes that the Armenian general had been killed because of "jealousy and slander." He believed that Mir Qasim had ordered Gurgin Khan's assassination, suspecting him of conspiring with the British. It appears that the nawab, in his desperation, ordered Gurgin's killing after receiving reports that he had been plotting with the British, when in fact Gurgin Khan had rejected a British offer to abandon the nawab to save the life of his brother, Petrus, then a prisoner of the British. However, this is not the only version of the events. According to a report by Louis Taillefert, the director of the Dutch East India Company, the Seth brothers Mahatab Rai and Swarupchand, hoping to ingratiate themselves with the British, had paid some Mughal soldiers to kill Gurgin Khan. According to Ghulam Hussain, a servant of the Seth brothers named Shahab al-Daula had earlier accused Gurgin of conspiring against Mir Qasim. In Bhattacharya's view, it is possible that the Seth brothers had organized the assassination of Gurgin Khan with British support.

== Cultural depictions ==
An eighteenth-century painting made in Murshidabad by Dip Chand probably depicts Gurgin Khan. The painting depicts an officer seated on a terrace, smoking a hookah, with two servants standing by. It is now held at the Victoria and Albert Museum in London. Gurgin Khan is a character in the historical novel Chandrasekhar by the famous nineteenth-century Bengali author Bankim Chandra Chatterjee. In the book, the Armenian general is depicted as an opportunist seeking to take the throne of Bengal for himself.
