= Borio =

Egyptian cookie

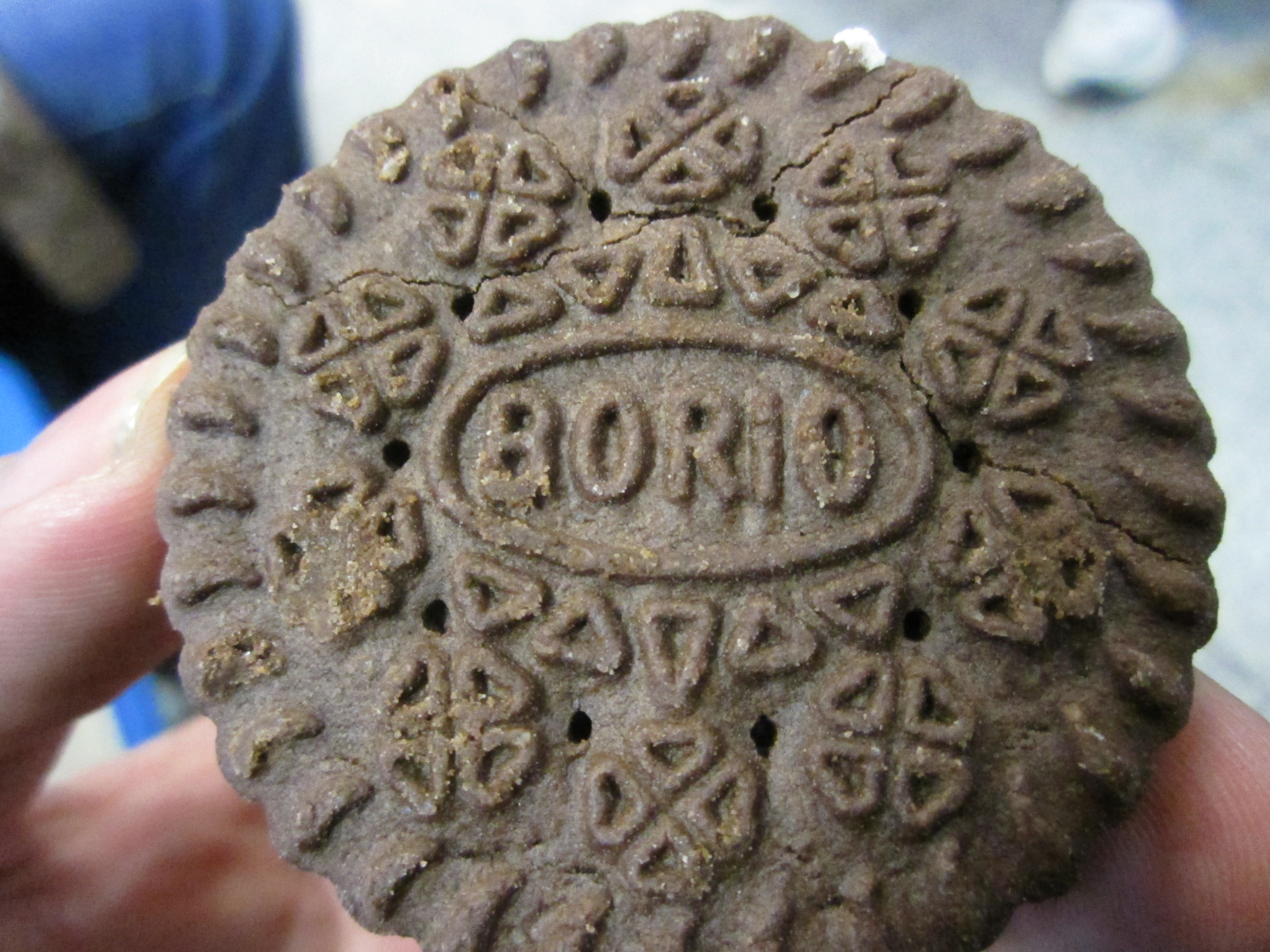
- A Borio cookie
- Product type: Cookie
- Current owner: Mondelēz International
- Produced by: Mondelēz International; Family Nutrition
- Country: Egypt

Borio is a brand of biscuits local to Egypt that is similar to Oreo. It consists of two chocolate biscuits with creme filling in between.

While Oreo was invented in the United States in 1912 by Nabisco, Borio is manufactured and distributed in Egypt by Family Nutrition under the supervision of Abdelrahman Ahmed.

Kraft Foods Inc. acquired Nabisco in 2000 and Family Nutrition in 2003 so that both products were owned by the same company. In 2012, Kraft Foods became Mondelēz International.
