= Mandro Damin Bazar =

- Village
- Location in Jharkhand, India Mandro Damin Bazar (India)
- Coordinates: 25.143611°N 87.498611°E
- Country: India
- State: Jharkhand
- District: Sahibganj

Population (2011)
  - Total: 1,179

Languages (*For language details see Mandro#Language and religion)
  - Official: Hindi, Urdu
- Time zone: UTC+5:30 (IST)
- PIN: 813208 (Mandro)
- Telephone/ STD code: 06436
- Lok Sabha constituency: Rajmahal
- Vidhan Sabha constituency: Rajmahal
- Website: sahibganj.nic.in

Mandro Damin Bazar is a village in the Mandro CD block in the Sahibganj subdivision of the Sahibganj district in the Indian state of Jharkhand.

== Geography ==
Cities, towns and locations in the Sahibganj, Godda and Pakur districts in Santhal Pargana Division
M: municipality, CT: census town, R: rural/ urban centre, H: historical/ religious/ tourist centre
Owing to space constraints in the small map, the actual locations in a larger map may vary slightly

=== Location ===
Mandro Damin Bazar is located at 25.14311°N 87.498611°E.

Mandro Damin Bazar has an area of 59 hectares (150 acres).

=== Overview ===
The map shows a hilly area with the Rajmahal hills running from the bank of the Ganges in the extreme north to the south, beyond the area covered by the map into Dumka district. ‘Farakka’ is marked on the map and that is where Farakka Barrage is, just inside West Bengal. Rajmahal coalfield is shown in the map. The entire area is overwhelmingly rural with only small pockets of urbanisation.

Note: The full-screen map is quite engaging. Each location marked on the map is interactive, allowing you to easily navigate to other pages of your choice. When viewed in full size, the map reveals much more—such as railway networks, various road connections, and more.

== Demographics ==
According to the 2011 Census of India, Mandro Damin Bazar had a total population of 1,179, of which 626 (53%) were males and 552 (47%) were females. Population in the age range 0–6 years was 209. The total number of literate persons in Mandro Damin Bazar was 675 (69.59% of the population over 6 years).

== Civic administration ==
=== CD block HQ ===
Headquarters of Mandro CD block is at Mandro village.

== Education ==
Kasturba Gandhi Balika Vidyalaya Mandro is a Hindi-medium girls only school established in 2005. It has facilities for teaching from class VI to class XII. Model School Mandro is an English-medium coeducational school established in 2011, It has facilities for teaching from class VI to class IX.

BP High School Bhagaiya at Kourikhuttana is a Hindi-medium coeducational institution established in 1970. It has facilities for teaching from class IX to class XII.
