= Berhait Santali =

- Census Town
- Location in Jharkhand, India Berhait Santali (India)
- Coordinates: 24.896789°N 87.599242°E
- Country: India
- State: Jharkhand
- District: Sahibganj

Area
  - Total: 3.66 km^{2} (1.41 sq mi)

Population (2011)
  - Total: 9,753
  - Density: 2,660/km^{2} (6,900/sq mi)

Languages (*For language details see Barhait (community development block)#Language and religion)
  - Official: Hindi, Urdu
- Time zone: UTC+5:30 (IST)
- PIN: 816102
- Telephone/ STD code: 06426
- Lok Sabha constituency: Rajmahal
- Vidhan Sabha constituency: Barhait
- Website: sahibganj.nic.in

Berhait Santali is a census town in the Barhait CD block in the Sahibganj subdivision of the Sahibganj district in the Indian state of Jharkhand.

== Geography ==
Cities, towns and locations in the Sahibganj, Godda and Pakur districts in Santhal Pargana Division
M: municipality, CT: census town, R: rural/ urban centre, H: historical/ religious/ tourist centre
Owing to space constraints in the small map, the actual locations in a larger map may vary slightly

=== Location ===
Berhait Santali is located at 24.896789°N 87.599242°E.

Berhait Santali has an area of 3.66 square kilometres (1.41 sq mi).

=== Overview ===
The map shows a hilly area with the Rajmahal hills running from the bank of the Ganges in the extreme north to the south, beyond the area covered by the map into Dumka district. ‘Farakka’ is marked on the map and that is where Farakka Barrage is, just inside West Bengal. Rajmahal coalfield is shown in the map. The entire area is overwhelmingly rural with only small pockets of urbanisation.

== Demographics ==
According to the 2011 Census of India, Berhait Santali had a total population of 9,753, of which 4,997 (51%) were males and 4,756 (49%) were females. Population in the age range 0–6 years was 1,979. The total number of literate persons in Berhait Santali was 4,168 (53.61% of the population over 6 years).

== Infrastructure ==
According to the District Census Handbook 2011, Sahibganj, Berhait Santali covered an area of 3.66 km^{2}. Among the civic amenities, it had 0.5 km roads with both open and closed drains, the protected water supply involved uncovered well, hand pump. It had 151 domestic electric connections, 18 road lighting points. Among the educational facilities it had 2 primary schools, 2 middle schools, the nearest secondary, senior secondary schools at Barharwa 20 km away, 1 non-formal education centre (Sarva Sikhsa Abhiyan). It had the branch offices of 1 nationalised bank, 1 private commercial bank, 1 agricultural credit society.

== Police station ==
Barhait police station serves this block.

== CD block HQ ==
Headquarters of Barhait CD block is at Barhait village.

== Education ==
SSD High School is a Hindi-medium coeducational institution established in 1949. It has facilities for teaching from class IX to class XII.

Kasturba Gandhi Balika Vidyalaya is a Hindi-medium girls only institution established in 2008. It has facilities for teaching from class VI to class XII.

Government High School Barhait is a Hindi-medium coeducational institution established in 1986. It has facilities for teaching in classes IX and X.

UPG Government Adarsh High School Berhait is a Hindi-medium coeducational institution established in 1912. It has facilities for teaching from class I to class X.
