= Borio, Sahibganj =

Borio
- Census Town
- Location in Jharkhand, India Borio (India)
- Coordinates: 25.034889°N 87.593194°E
- Country: India
- State: Jharkhand
- District: Sahibganj

Area
  - Total: 0.24 km^{2} (0.093 sq mi)

Population (2011)
  - Total: 6,964
  - Density: 29,000/km^{2} (75,000/sq mi)

Languages (*For language details see Borio (community development block)#Language and religion)
  - Official: Hindi, Urdu
- Time zone: UTC+5:30 (IST)
- PIN: 816120
- Telephone/ STD code: 06436
- Lok Sabha constituency: Rajmahal
- Vidhan Sabha constituency: Borio
- Website: sahibganj.nic.in

Borio is a census town in the Borio CD block in the Sahibganj subdivision of the Sahibganj district in the Indian state of Jharkhand.

== Geography ==
Cities, towns and locations in the Sahibganj, Godda and Pakur districts in Santhal Pargana Division
M: municipality, CT: census town, R: rural/ urban centre, H: historical/ religious/ tourist centre
Owing to space constraints in the small map, the actual locations in a larger map may vary slightly

=== Location ===
Borio is located at 25.034889°N 87.593194°E.

Borio has an area of 0.24 square kilometres (0.093 sq mi).

=== Overview ===
The map shows a hilly area with the Rajmahal hills running from the bank of the Ganges in the extreme north to the south, beyond the area covered by the map into Dumka district. ‘Farakka’ is marked on the map and that is where Farakka Barrage is, just inside West Bengal. Rajmahal coalfield is shown in the map. The entire area is overwhelmingly rural with only small pockets of urbanisation.

Note: On the full screen map all places marked on the map are linked and you can easily move on to another page of your choice. Enlarge the map to see what else is there – one gets railway links, many more road links and so on.

== Demographics ==
According to the 2011 Census of India, Borio had a total population of 6,964, of which 3,612 (52%) were males and 3,352 (48%) were females. Population in the age range 0–6 years was 1,174. The total number of literate persons in Borio was 3,903 (67.41% of the population over 6 years).

== Infrastructure ==
According to the District Census Handbook 2011, Sahibganj, Borio covered an area of 0.24 km^{2}. Among the civic amenities, it had 14 km roads with open drains, the protected water supply involved uncovered well, hand pump. It had 281 domestic electric connections. Among the medical facilities, it had 1 hospital, 3 dispensaries, 3 health centres, 1 family welfare centre, 1 maternity and child welfare centre, 1 TB hospital/ clinic, 5 medicine shops. Among the educational facilities it had 2 primary schools, 1 middle school, 1 secondary school, the nearest senior secondary school at Sahebganj 20 km away, 1 non-formal education centre (Sarba Sikhsha Abhiyan). It had the branch offices of 1 nationalised bank, 1 agricultural credit society.

== Civic administration ==
=== Police station ===
Borio police station serves Borio CD block.

=== CD block HQ ===
The headquarters of the Borio CD block is at Borio village.

== Education ==
Shibu Soren Janjatiya Degree College, affiliated with Sido Kanhu Murmu University, was established at Borio.

Rajkikrit High School is a Hindi-medium boys only institution established in 1953. It has facilities for education from class IX to class XII.

Project KN Girls High School Borio is a Hindi-medium girls only institution established in 1981. It has facilities for teaching from class VIII to class X.

Madrasa Nurul Hoda Borio is an Urdu-medium coeducational institution established in 1957. It has facilities for teaching from class I to class X.
