= Thomas Adams (British Army officer) =

Major Thomas Adams
- Born: c. 1730
- Died: January 1764; Calcutta, Bengal
- Military career
- Allegiance: Great Britain
- Branch: British Army
- Service years: 1747–1764
- Rank: Major
- Units: 37th Regiment of Foot; 84th Regiment of Foot
- Conflicts: War of the Austrian Succession; Third Carnatic War

Thomas Adams (1730 – January 1764), was a British Army major, posthumously promoted to Brigadier-general based on account of his defence of the British position in Bengal in 1763.

== Biography ==
Adams began military service in 1747 as a volunteer under the command of the Duke of Cumberland in the Netherlands. On 25 June that year he obtained a commission as ensign in the 37th Foot, and rose to the rank of captain nine years later. Transferred to the 84th Foot, and serving as a major in India, in 1762, he was appointed to the command of the united forces of the crown and of the East India Company in Bengal.

After the Battle of Plassey, British power was by no means complete. Mir Qasim, the minister and son-in-law of Mir Jafar, had displaced his master and had been invested as Nawab of Bengal at Patna. The Calcutta council was unscrupulous, the Nawab was deprived of revenue, and the reputation of the British had suffered.

Disputes on the subject of transit duties and an unjustifiable attack made by Mr. Ellis, one of the members of the council, upon the city of Patna, followed by the death of Mr. Amyatt, who had been sent as an envoy to the nawáb, and who was killed by the troops of the latter when resisting an attempt to make him prisoner, brought on war between the company and the nawáb. The forces of the latter numbered 40,000 men, including 25,000 infantry trained and disciplined on the European system, and a regiment of excellent artillerymen well supplied with guns. To oppose this force, Major Adams had under his command a small body of troops, variously estimated from 2,300 to 3,000, of whom only 850 were Europeans. His artillery also was inferior to that of the enemy. The campaign commenced on 2 July 1763, and lasted for four months, in the course of which Adams fought four actions, took two considerable forts and nearly 500 pieces of cannon, and defeated the most powerful Bengali army that up to that time had confronted the British in India.

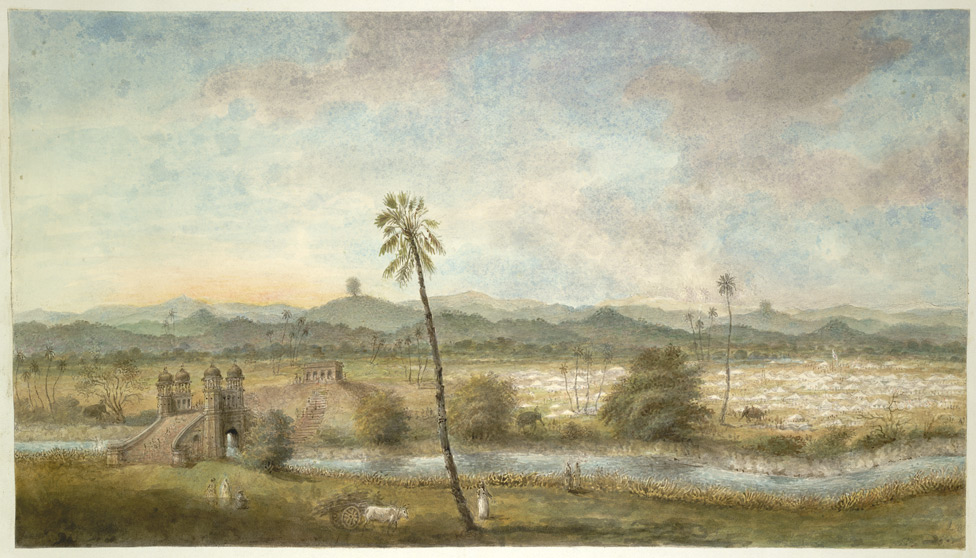
The bridge at Udhua Nullah, with an encampment beyond and the foothills of the Rajmahal Hills in the distance, Udhua Nullah, located in Bihar, was the site of the defeat of Nawab Mir Kasim of Bengal by Major Adams in 1763

Key engagements included the Battle of Gheriah in August 1763. This lasted for four hours; the issue was at one time doubtful, the nawab's troops breaking through a portion of the English line and capturing two guns, but the superior discipline of the company's sepoys compelled the enemy to retreat with the loss of all their guns and stores. Another engagement was the Battle of Udhanala in September 1763: Adams pursued Qasim's troops to the gates of Monghyr and then besieged Patna where he was victorious but not before Qasim had killed some 60 British prisoners. Adams followed Qasim's remaining sepoys for a few more days and then returned to Calcutta having conquered the whole of Bengal in just a few months.

At the close of the campaign, Major Adams was compelled by ill-health to resign his command and died at Calcutta in January 1764. As soon as the intelligence of the campaign reached England, Adams was advanced to the rank of brigadier-general, but he had already been dead for some months when his commission was issued.

== Notes ==
Military offices
| Preceded by Eyre Coote | Commander-in-Chief, India; 1763–1764 | Succeeded by John Carnac |
