= Borio (community development block) =

- Community development block
- Location in Jharkhand Borio (India)
- Coordinates: 25°1′44″N 87°35′31.9″E
- Country: India
- State: Jharkhand
- District: Sahibganj

Government
  - Type: Federal democracy

Area
  - Total: 391.76 km^{2} (151.26 sq mi)
- Elevation: 45 m (148 ft)

Population (2011)
  - Total: 97,845
  - Density: 249.76/km^{2} (646.87/sq mi)

Languages
  - Official: Hindi, Urdu

Literacy (2011)
  - Total literates: 33,916 (42.38%)
- Time zone: UTC+5:30 (IST)
- PIN: 816120 (Borio)
- Telephone/STD code: 06436
- Vehicle registration: JH 18
- Lok Sabha constituency: Rajmahal
- Vidhan Sabha constituency: Borio
- Website: sahibganj.nic.in

Borio is a community development block that forms an administrative division in the Sahibganj subdivision of the Sahibganj district, Jharkhand state, India.

== Geography ==
Borio, the eponymous CD block headquarters, is located at 25°1′44″N 87°35′31.9″E.

It is located 27 km from Sahibganj, the district headquarters.

Sahebganj district may be divided into three natural divisions – (i) the hilly portion stretching from the Ganges on the north to the borders of West Bengal on the south, (ii) the uplands, undulations, long ridges and depressions, with fertile lands, and (iii) the low fertile alluvial plains lying between the hills and the Ganges, with the Sahibganj loop line passing through the narrow strip. Three rivers flowing through this region – the Ganges, Gumani and Bansloi – make the plains rich and cultivable.

The Santhal Pargana division has about 5,120 square kilometres (1,980 sq mi) hilly tract, out of which about 3,471 square kilometres (1,340 sq mi) is in Damin-i-koh, which is spread across Sahibganj, Godda and Dumka districts, a major portion being in Sahibganj district. The Borio, Barhait, Taljhari and Pathana CD blocks of Sahibganj district are in the Damin-i-koh tract. Dense forests once covering the hills slopes have thinned out. Paddy is produced in the valleys. Barbatti and maize are grown in the hill area. Paharias, Mal Paharias and Santals generally inhabit the area.

Borio CD block is bounded by Sahibganj CD block on the north, Taljhari CD block on the east, Barhait CD block on the south, and Boarijore CD block in Godda district on the west.

Borio CD block has an area of 391.76 km^{2}.Borio police station serves this block. Headquarters of this CD block is at Borio village.

Borio CD block has 344 gram panchayats, 264 inhabited (chiragi) and 80 uninhabited (bechiragi) villages.

== Demographics ==
=== Population ===
According to the 2011 Census of India, Borio CD block had a total population of 97,845, of which 90,881 were rural and 6,964 were urban. There were 49,234 (50%) males and 48,611 (50%) females. Population in the age range 0–6 years was 17,825. Scheduled Castes numbered 2,479 (2.53%) and Scheduled Tribes numbered 59,732 (61.05%).

Borio, with a population of 6,964 in 2011 census, is a census town.

=== Literacy ===
According to the 2011 census, the total number of literate persons in Borio CD block was 33,916 (42.38% of the population over 6 years) out of which 21,045 (62%) were males and 12,871 (38%) were females. The gender disparity (the difference between female and male literacy rates) was 24%.

See also – List of Jharkhand districts ranked by literacy rate

Literacy in CD Blocks of
Sahibganj district
Sahibganj subdivision
Sahibganj – 56.07%
Mandro – 46.03%
Borio – 42.38%
Barhait – 42.50%
Rajmahal subdivision
Taljhari – 47.74%
Rajmahal – 51.28%
Udhwa – 47.71%
Pathna – 47.71%
Barharwa – 58.54%
Source: 2011 Census: CD Block Wise
Primary Census Abstract Data

=== Language and religion ===
Religions in Borio Block (2011)
Religion	Percent
Hinduism	68.68%
Islam	13.59%
Christianity	12.22%
Sarna	5.32%
Other or not stated	0.19%

Hindus are the majority community. Muslims and Christians are two minority communities. In 2001, Hindus were 62.25%, Muslims 11.91%, Christians 10.77% and Sarna followers 14.71% of the population respectively.

Languages of Borio block (2011)
1. Santali (51.5%)
2. Hindi (11.0%)
3. Urdu (9.97%)
4. Khortha (8.17%)
5. Malto (8.06%)
6. 'Other' Hindi (4.17%)
7. Bengali (2.49%)
8. Mundari (1.45%)
9. Bhojpuri (1.34%)
10. Others (1.84%)

At the time of the 2011 census, 51.52% of the population spoke Santali, 10.99% Hindi, 9.97% Urdu, 8.17% Khortha, 8.06% Malto, 2.63% Bengali, 1.45% Mundari and 1.34% Bhojpuri as their first language. 4.17% of the population spoke languages classified as 'Others' under Hindi. The dialect of the region is Angika.

== Rural poverty ==
50-60% of the population of Sahibganj district were in the BPL category in 2004–2005, being in the same category as Pakur, Deoghar and Garhwa districts."Based on the number of the total rural households in Census 2011 and BPL Revision Survey of 2010-11 the percentage of BPL households in rural areas is 86.03 percent." Rural poverty in Jharkhand declined from 66% in 1993–94 to 46% in 2004–05. In 2011, it has come down to 39.1%.

== Economy ==
=== Livelihood ===
Livelihood
in Borio CD block
1. Cultivators (40.4%)
2. Agricultural labourers (43.9%)
3. Household industries (2.73%)
4. Other Workers (13.0%)

In Borio CD block in 2011, amongst the class of total workers, cultivators numbered 18,915 and formed 40.37%, agricultural labourers numbered 20,570 and formed 43.90%, household industry workers numbered 1,277 and formed 2.73% and other workers numbered 6,097 and formed 13.01%. Total workers numbered 49,193 and formed 50.28% of the total population. Non-workers numbered 48,652 and formed 49.72% of total population.

Note: In the census records a person is considered a cultivator, if the person is engaged in cultivation/ supervision of land owned. When a person who works on another person's land for wages in cash or kind or share, is regarded as an agricultural labourer. Household industry is defined as an industry conducted by one or more members of the family within the household or village, and one that does not qualify for registration as a factory under the Factories Act. Other workers are persons engaged in some economic activity other than cultivators, agricultural labourers and household workers. It includes factory, mining, plantation, transport and office workers, those engaged in business and commerce, teachers and entertainment artistes.

=== Infrastructure ===
There are 268 inhabited villages in Borio CD block. In 2011, 23 villages had power supply. 31 villages had tap water (treated/ untreated), 250 villages had well water (covered/ uncovered), 143 villages had hand pumps, and 1 village did not have drinking water facility. 15 village had post offices, 11 villages had sub post offices, 9 villages had telephones (land lines), 17 villages had public call offices and 80 villages had mobile phone coverage. 225 villages had pucca (paved) roads, 28 villages had bus service (private/public), 10 villages had auto/ modified auto, 19 villages had taxis/ vans, 74 villages had tractors, 12 villages had navigable waterways. 7 villages had bank branches, 3 villages had ATMs, 9 villages had agricultural credit societies, 6 village had cinema/ video hall, 1 village had public library and public reading room. 58 villages had public distribution system, 10 villages had weekly haat (market) and 73 villages had assembly polling stations.

=== Agriculture ===
A large part of Sahibganj district is hilly and most of the thick forests are gone. Some of the plains are cultivable. The livelihood scenario presented above indicates that a large population depends on agriculture. In Borio CD block 19.93% of the total area is cultivable area and 6.23% of the cultivable area is irrigated area.

=== Backward Regions Grant Fund ===
Sahibganj district is listed as a backward region and receives financial support from the Backward Regions Grant Fund. The fund created by the Government of India is designed to redress regional imbalances in development. As of 2012, 272 districts across the country were listed under this scheme. The list includes 21 districts of Jharkhand.

== Education ==
Borio CD block had 36 villages with pre-primary schools, 172 villages with primary schools, 66 villages with middle schools, 8 villages with secondary schools, 4 villages with senior secondary schools, 94 villages with no educational facility.
*Senior secondary schools are also known as Inter colleges in Jharkhand

Shibu Soren Janjatiya Degree College, affiliated with Sido Kanhu Murmu University, was established at Borio.

== Healthcare ==
Borio CD block had 2 villages with primary health centres, 11 villages with primary health subcentres, 2 villages with maternity and child welfare centres, 3 villages with TB clinics, 6 villages with allopathic hospitals, 3 villages with dispensaries, 4 villages with family welfare centres, 21 villages with medicine shops.
.*Private medical practitioners, alternative medicine etc. not included
