= Mir Qasim =

Nawab of Bengal from 1760 to 1763

Mīr Qasim
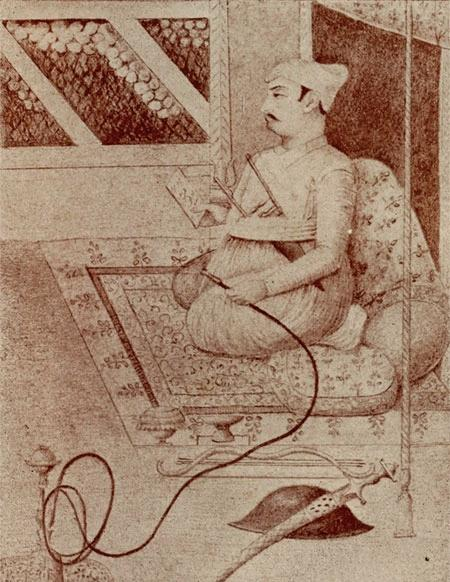

Nawab Nazim of Bengal and Bihar
- Reign: 20 October 1760 – 7 July 1763
- Predecessor: Mir Jafar
- Successor: Mir Jafar
- Full name: Mir Muhammad Qasim Ali Khan
- Died: 8 May 1777; Kotwal
- Noble family: Najafi
- Spouses: Nawab Fatima Begum Sahiba, daughter of Mir Jafar and Shah Khanum
- Issue: Mirza Ghulam Uraiz Ja'afari; Mirza Muhammad Baqir ul-Husain; Nawab Muhammad Aziz Khan Bahadur; Nawab Badr ud-din Ali Khan Bahadur
- Father: Mir Razi Khan
- Military career
- Allegiance: Mughal Empire
- Branch: Nawab of Bengal
- Rank: Nawab; Faujdar (formerly)
- Conflicts: Bengal War; Battle of Buxar

Mir Qasim (d. 8 May 1777) was the Nawab of Bengal from 1760 to 1763. He was installed as Nawab with the support of the British East India Company, replacing Mir Jafar, his father-in-law, who had himself been supported earlier by the East India Company after his role in winning the Battle of Plassey for the British. However, Mir Jafar eventually ran into disputes with the East India Company and attempted to form an alliance with the Dutch East India Company instead. The British eventually defeated the Dutch at Chinsura and overthrew Mir Jafar, replacing him with Mir Qasim. Qasim too later fell out with the British and fought against them at Buxar. His defeat has been suggested as a key reason in the British becoming the dominant power in large parts of North and East India.

== Early life and family ==
Mir Syed Qasim was the son of Mir Muhammad Razi Khan, and claimed descent from Ali al-Ridha. His paternal grandfather, Sayyid Husayn Ridhwi, entered the Mughal Empire during the reign of Aurangzeb, who married him to the daughter of Mir Hadi (Sheikh Sulayman Fazail). Ridhwi was conferred the title of Imtiaz Khan, and made the Waqia-navis (Intelligence Minister) and subsequently the Dewan of Bihar. Qasim's grandfather also wrote Persian poetry under the pen name of Khalis, and a lengthy diwan is attributed to him.

Qasim was married to Fatima Begum, a daughter of Mir Jafar and Shah Khanum, and a granddaughter of Nawab Alivardi Khan of Bengal. Prior to becoming the Nawab of Bengal, he served as the Faujdar of Rangpur for roughly two decades.

== Life ==
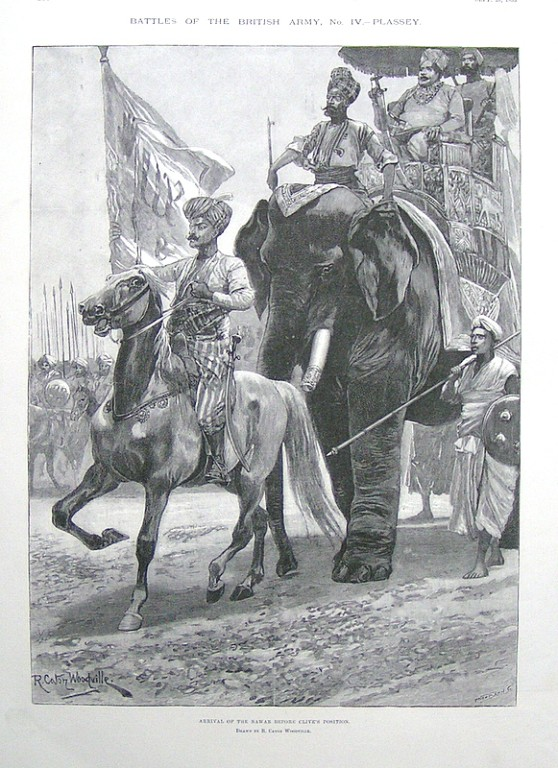
The Nawab's arrival before Clive's position.

Upon ascending the throne, Mir Qasim rewarded the East India Company with lavish gifts.He also granted it the right to collect revenue of the districts of Burdwan, Midnapore and Chittagong. However, Qasim soon ran into disputes with the Company over trade issues, as they objected to Qasim's attempt to levy import and export tariffs on their goods. In particular, they objected to a 9% duty imposed of all foreign traders. The relationship between Qasim and the company slowly deteriorated, and he shifted his capital from Murshidabad to Munger in present-day Bihar where he raised an army, financing his new troops by streamlining tax collection.

Qasim vigorously opposed the East India Company's position that their Mughal license (a dastak) meant that they could trade without paying taxes (other local merchants with dastaks were required to pay up to 40% of their revenue as tax). Frustrated at the British refusal to pay these taxes, Mir Qasim abolished taxes on the local traders as well. This upset the advantage that the European traders had been enjoying so far, and hostilities built up. Mir Qasim invaded the Company offices in Patna in 1763, massacring 45 Europeans, including the Resident. Mir Qasim allied with Shuja-ud-Daula of Avadh and Shah Alam II, the incumbent Mughal emperor against the British. However, their combined forces were defeated in the Battle of Buxar in 1764. Qasim also launched a brief invasion of Hindu Kingdom of Nepal in 1763 during the reign of Maharajadhiraja Prithvi Narayan Shah, the first King of Nepal. Kanak Singh Baaniya, Chief Minister of Makwanpur, had requested Qasim's intervention against Shah after he had taken Bikram Sen, the king of Makwanpur, hostage. Qasim dispatched a military force under the command of his general Gurgin Khan to invade Nepal. Gurgin was swiftly defeated by Shah's army, and retreated.

Unlike Siraj-ud-Daulah before him, Mir Qasim was an effective and popular ruler. His defeat at Buxar established the East India Company as a powerful force in the province of Bengal in a much more real sense than at Plassey seven years earlier and at Bedara five years earlier. By 1793 the East India company had abolished the Nizamat (referring to the Mughal suzerainty) and became completely in charge of the former Mughal province.

== Death ==
Having lost all his men and influence after his defeat at Buxar, Qasim was expelled from his camp by Shuja-ud-Daula on 23 October 1764; fleeing to Rohilkhand, Allahabad, Gohad and Jodhpur, and eventually settling at Kotwal, near Delhi ca. 1774.

Mir Qasim died in obscurity and abject poverty possibly from dropsy, at Kotwal, near Delhi on 8 May 1777.

== See also ==
- Mughal Empire
- Shia Islam in India

Mir Qasim Born: (Unknown) Died: 8 May 1777
Preceded by Saulat Jang	Faujdar of Rangpur; 1740 – 20 October 1760	Succeeded by Abid Ali Khan
Preceded by Mir Jafar	Nawab of Bengal; 20 October 1760 – 7 July 1763	Succeeded by Mir Jafar
