= Dumka Sadar subdivision =

- Subdivision
- Location in Jharkhand, India Dumka Sadar subdivision (India)
- Coordinates: 24.27°N 87.25°E
- Country: India
- State: Jharkhand
- District: Dumka
- Headquarters: Dumka

Area
  - Total: 3,761 km^{2} (1,452 sq mi)

Population
  - Total: 1,321,442
  - Density: 351.4/km^{2} (910.0/sq mi)

Languages
  - Official: Hindi, Urdu
- Time zone: IST
- Website: dumka.nic.in

Dumka Sadar subdivision is the only administrative subdivision of the Dumka district in the Santhal Pargana division in the state of Jharkhand, India.

== Overview ==
Dumka Sadar subdivision is a plateau region. It is divided into four micro subregions. The Dumka-Godda Uplands covers Saraiyahat, Jarmundi, Jama, Ranishwar, Shikaripara and parts of Ramgarh, Dumka and Masalia CD blocks. Scattered hillocks with forests are spread over the region with elevation above mean sea level varying from 274 to 753 metres (899 to 2,470 ft). The Deoghar Uplands covers only parts of Masalia CD block. The area has large number of hillocks covered with forests. The Rajmahal Hills, spread over the north-eastern part of the subdivision, covers Ramgarh, Dumka, Kathikund and Gopikandar CD blocks. The Pakur Uplands, in the eastern part of the district, with a height of 31 metres (102 ft) above mean sea level, covers parts of Gopikandar and Kathikund CD blocks. The two blocks, named last, also fall under the Damin-i-koh region of Santhal Parganas.

== History ==
Dumka subdivision was formed in 1855 as a part of Santhal Parganas district with its headquarters at Dumka. Santhal Parganas district comprises Dumka, Deoghar, Sahibganj, Godda, Pakur and Jamtara subdivisions. In 1983, Deoghar, Sahibganj and Godda subdivisions were given the status of a district, and a result Dumka subdivision remained in Dumka district.

== Subdivisions ==
Dumka district has only one administrative subdivision:

Subdivision	Headquarters	Area km^{2}	Population (2011)	Rural population % (2011)	Urban population % (2011)
Dumka Sadar	Dumka	3,761	1,321,442	93.18	6.82

== Administrative units ==
Dumka subdivision has 10 community development blocks, 2,925 total villages, 2,688 inhabited villages, 2 statutory towns and 3 census town. The statutory towns are at Dumka and Basukinath. The census towns are: Rasikpur, Dudhani and Purana Dumka. The subdivision has its headquarters at Dumka.

Cities, towns and locations in the Deoghar, Dumka and Jamtara districts in Santhal Pargana Division
M: Municipality, CT: census town, R: Rural/ Urban centre, D: Dam,
Owing to space constraints in the small map, the actual locations in a larger map may vary slightly

== Demographics ==
As per the 2011 Census of India data Dumka Sadar subdivision, in Dumka district in 2011, had a total population of 1,321,442. There were 668,514 (51%) males and 652,928 (49%) females. Scheduled castes numbered 79,614 (6.02%) and scheduled tribes numbered 571,077 (43.22%). Density of population was 351 persons per square km. Literacy rate was 61.02%, male literacy rate was 72.96%, female literacy rate was 48.82%.

See also – List of Jharkhand districts ranked by literacy rate

== Police stations ==
Police stations in Dumka Sadar subdivision are at:

1. Gopikandar
2. Hansdiha
3. Jama
4. Jarmundi
5. Kathikund
6. Masalia
7. Mufassil
8. Ramgarh
9. Ranishwar
10. Shikaripara
11. Saraiyahat
12. Taljhari
13. Tongra
14. Town

== Blocks ==
Community development blocks in Jamtara Sadar subdivision are:

CD Block	Headquarters	Area km^{2}	Population (2011)	SC %	ST %	Literacy rate %	NP, CT
Dumka	Dumka	375.45	163.201	6.73	42.84	70.08	3
Gopikandar	Gopikandar	220.67	42,063	1.58	84.58	50.12	-
Jama	Jama	391.46	137,963	5.12	49.30	61.88	-
Jarmundi	Jarmundi	393.57	168,163	6.95	26.64	58.06	-
Kathikund	Kathikund	306.20	71,458	2.45	63.54	54.09	-
Masalia	Masalia	459.97	124,554	5.10	58.53	61.66	-
Ramgarh	Ramgarh	481.49	159,911	4.77	47.85	55.45	-
Ranishwar	Ranishwar	346.74	101,667	7.85	45.14	47.54	-
Saraiyahat	Saraiyahat	300.44	156,291	9.08	17.95	58.64	-
Shikaripara	Shikaripara	438.25	131,464	3.83	60.49	57.10	-

== Education ==
In 2011, Dumka Sadar subdivision out of a total 2,688 inhabited villages there were 377 villages with pre-primary schools, 2,118 villages with primary schools, 701 villages with middle schools, 77 villages with secondary schools, 25 villages with senior secondary schools, 5 villages with general degree colleges, 542 villages with no educational facility.
.*Senior secondary schools are also known as Inter colleges in Jharkhand

=== Educational institutions ===
The following institutions are located in Dumka Sadar subdivision:

- Sido Kanhu Murmu University was established in 1992 at Dumka.
- Government Engineering College Dumka was established as an institution under PPP model between the Government of Jharkhand and Techno India Group at Dumka.
- Phulo Jhano Murmu Medical College and Hospital was established in 2019 at Dumka.
- St. Xavier's College, Dumka was established in 2011 at Maharo, Dumka.
- Santal Pargana College was established in 1955 at Dumka.
- Santal Pargana Mahila College was established in 1974 at Dumka.
- A.N. College was established at Dumka.
- Shikaripara College was established at Shikaripara.
- Mayurakshi Gramin College was established at Ranishwar.
- Phulo-Jhano Murmu College of Dairy Technology at Hansdiha, is Jharkhand's first Dairy Technology college established in 2019.

== Healthcare ==
In 2011, Dumka Sadar subdivision there were 70 villages with primary health centres, 228 villages with primary health subcentres, 95 villages with maternity and child welfare centres, 37 villages with allopathic hospitals, 45 villages with dispensaries, 16 villages with veterinary hospitals, 31 villages with family welfare centres, 75 villages with medicine shops.
.*Private medical practitioners, alternative medicine etc. not included

=== Medical facilities ===
(Anybody having referenced information about location of government/ private medical facilities may please add it here)
