= Jama =

JAMA is a peer-reviewed medical journal published by the American Medical Association.

Jama or JAMA may also refer to:

== Places ==
- Jama (woreda), Amhara Region, Ethiopia
- Jama, Dumka, Jharkhand state, India
  - Jama, Dumka (village)
  - Jama (Vidhan Sabha constituency)
- Jama Canton
  - Jama, Ecuador
  - Jama River
- Jama, Iran
- Jama, Kranj, Slovenia
- Jama, Novo Mesto, Slovenia
- Djamaa, or Jama'a, Algeria
- Paso de Jama, a mountain pass between Argentina and Chile
- Kingisepp, formerly Jama, in the Leningrad Oblast, Russia
- Jama (Martian crater)
- Jama Formation, a geologic formation in Ecuador

== Other uses ==
- Jama (geology)
- Jama (coat), a garment of South Asia
- Jama (name), a common Somali male name, including a list of people with the name
- JAMA (numerical linear algebra library), a software library
- JAMA (political party), a former Iranian political party
- JAMA (Journal of the American Medical Association), a medical journal
- Japan Automobile Manufacturers Association, a trade association
- Journal of Asian Martial Arts, a martial arts journal
- Jama (film), Indian Tamil-language drama film written and directed by Pari Elavazhagan

== See also ==
- Jama masjid, a type of mosque
- Japan Amusement Machine and Marketing Association (JAMMA)
