= Dumka (community development block) =

- Community development block
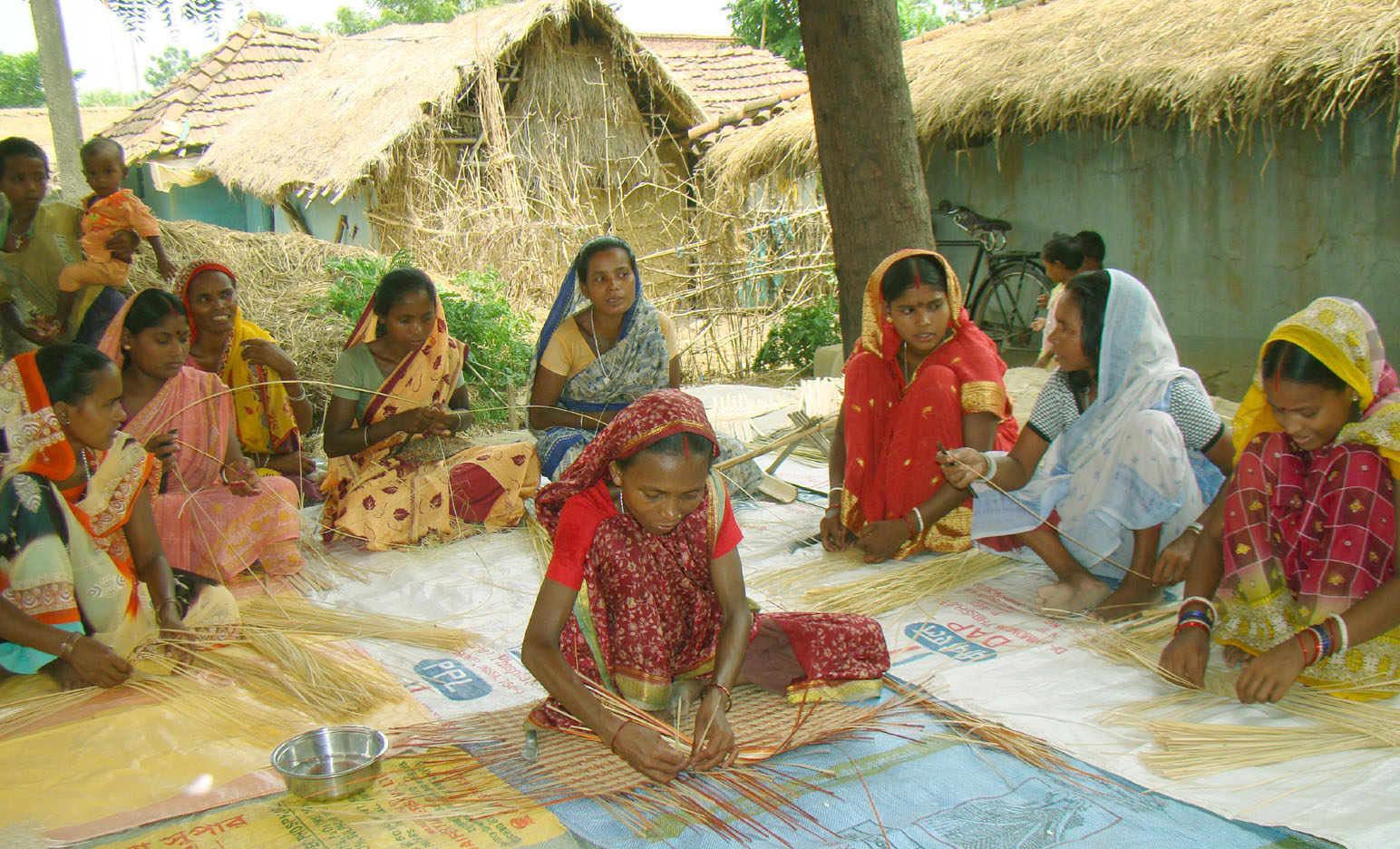
- Dumka Bamboo product making and Rabbit's Toilet

- Coordinates: 24°16′54″N 87°15′55″E
- Country: India
- State: Jharkhand
- District: Dumka

Government
  - Type: Federal democracy

Area
  - Total: 375.45 km^{2} (144.96 sq mi)
- Elevation: 137 m (449 ft)

Population (2011)
  - Total: 163,201
  - Density: 434.68/km^{2} (1,125.8/sq mi)

Languages
  - Official: Santali, Hindi, Urdu

Literacy (2011)
  - Total literates: 96,719 (70.08%)
- Time zone: UTC+5:30 (IST)
- PIN: 814101 (Dumka)
- Telephone/STD code: 06434
- Vehicle registration: JH 04
- Lok Sabha constituency: Dumka
- Vidhan Sabha constituency: Dumka
- Website: dumka.nic.in

Dumka is a community development block that forms an administrative division in the Dumka Sadar subdivision of the Dumka district, Jharkhand state, India.

== Geography ==
Dumka, the eponymous CD block headquarters, is located at 24°16′54″N 87°15′55″E.

Dumka district is a plateau region. It is divided into four micro subregions. The Dumka-Godda Uplands covers Saraiyahat, Jarmundi, Jama, Ranishwar, Shikaripara and parts of Ramgarh, Dumka and Masalia CD blocks. Scattered hillocks with forests are spread over the region with elevation above mean sea level varying from 274 to 753 metres (899 to 2,470 ft). The Deoghar Uplands covers only parts of Masalia CD block. The area has large number of hillocks covered with forests. The Rajmahal Hills, spread over the north-eastern part of the district, covers Ramgarh, Dumka, Kathikund and Gopikandar CD blocks. The Pakur Uplands, in the eastern part of the district, with a height of 31 metres (102 ft) above mean sea level, covers parts of Gopikandar and Kathikund CD blocks. The two blocks, named last, also fall under the Damin-i-koh region of Santhal Parganas.

Dumka CD block is bounded by Ramgarh CD block on the north, Kathikund and Shikaripara CD blocks on the east, Ranishwar and Masalia CD blocks on the south, and Jama CD block on the west.

Dumka CD block has an area of 375.45 km^{2}. Dumka Mufassil police station serves this block. Headquarters of this CD block is at Dumka.

== Demographics ==
=== Population ===
As per the 2011 Census of India Dumka CD block had a total population of 163,201, of which 137,730 were rural and 25,471 were urban. There were 82,585 (51%) males and 80,616 (49%) females. Population below 6 years was 25,197. Scheduled Castes numbered 10,986 (6.73%) and Scheduled Tribes numbered 69,912 (42.84%).

Dumka CD block has three census towns (2011 population figure in brackets): Rasikpur (8,320), Dudhani (7,117) and Purana Dumka (10,034).

=== Literacy ===
As per 2011 census the total number of literates in Dumka CD block was 96,719 (70.08% of the population over 6 years) out of which 55,839 (58%) were males and 40,880 (42%) were females. The gender disparity (the difference between female and male literacy rates) was 16%.

See also – List of Jharkhand districts ranked by literacy rate

Literacy in CD Blocks of
Dumka district
Saraiyahat – 58.64%
Jarmundi – 58.06%
Kathikund - 54.09%
Ramgarh – 55.45%
Gopikandar – 50.12%
Shikaripara – 57.10%
Ranishwar – 60.06%
Dumka – 70.08%
Jama – 61.88%
Masalia – 61.66%
Source: 2011 Census: CD Block Wise
Primary Census Abstract Data

=== Language and religion ===
Religions in Dumka block (2011)
Religion	Percent
Hinduism	76.16%
Islam	10.83%
Christianity	9.14%
Sarna	3.40%
Other or not stated	0.48%

Languages of Dumka block (2011)
1. Santali (31.8%)
2. Hindi (20.5%)
3. Khortha (19.9%)
4. Bengali (11.5%)
5. Urdu (5.86%)
6. 'Other' Hindi (3.12%)
7. Bhojpuri (3.07%)
8. Malto (2.03%)
9. Others (2.19%)

At the time of the 2011 census, 31.80% of the population spoke Santali, 20.50% Hindi, 19.89% Khortha, 11.54% Bengali, 5.86% Urdu, 3.07% Bhojpuri and 2.03% Malto as their first language. 3.12% of the population spoke 'Others' under Hindi.

== Rural poverty ==
60-70% of the population of Dumka district were in the BPL category in 2004–2005, being in the same category as Ranchi and Jamtara districts. Rural poverty in Jharkhand declined from 66% in 1993–94 to 46% in 2004–05. In 2011, it has come down to 39.1%.

== Economy ==
=== Livelihood ===
Livelihood
in Dumka CD block
1. Cultivators (22.6%)
2. Agricultural labourers (47.8%)
3. Household industries (4.37%)
4. Other Workers (25.3%)

In Dumka CD block in 2011, amongst the class of total workers, cultivators numbered 13,672 and formed 22.57%, agricultural labourers numbered 28,949 and formed 47.79%, household industry workers numbered 2,648 and formed 4.37% and other workers numbered 15,312 and formed 25.28%. Total workers numbered 81,791 and formed 38.80% of the total population. Non-workers numbered 128,994 and formed 61.20% of total population.

Note: In the census records a person is considered a cultivator, if the person is engaged in cultivation/ supervision of land owned. When a person who works on another person's land for wages in cash or kind or share, is regarded as an agricultural labourer. Household industry is defined as an industry conducted by one or more members of the family within the household or village, and one that does not qualify for registration as a factory under the Factories Act. Other workers are persons engaged in some economic activity other than cultivators, agricultural labourers and household workers. It includes factory, mining, plantation, transport and office workers, those engaged in business and commerce, teachers and entertainment artistes.

=== Infrastructure ===
There are 256 inhabited villages in Dumka CD block. In 2011, 85 villages had power supply. 3 villages had tap water (treated/ untreated), 256 villages had well water (covered/ uncovered), 246 villages had hand pumps, and all villages had drinking water facility. 24 villages had post offices, 8 villages had sub post offices, 11 villages had telephones (land lines), 22 villages had public call offices and 101 villages had mobile phone coverage. 254 villages had pucca (paved) village roads, 47 villages had bus service (public/ private), 5 villages had railway stations, 9 villages had autos/ modified autos, and 41 villages had tractors. 10 villages had bank branches, 5 villages had agricultural credit societies, 2 villages had cinema/ video halls. 51 villages had public distribution system, 5 villages had weekly haat (market) and 21 villages had assembly polling stations.

=== Agriculture ===
Dumka district is a rural dominated area with a large population residing in the villages. "Agriculture practices are the main source of income for the rural people of the district." It is a hilly district receiving considerably high rainfall (1088mm to 1244mm annual average), resulting in a considerable vegetative cover. Ruthless exploitation of forests has reduced them to bushes without any big trees. Only 6.42% of the agricultural lands are irrigated by wells and tanks. Major crops in the district are paddy, maize and wheat. The availability of land has been a major problem. "The Santals have played an important part in the reclamation of land." The District Gazetteer of the Santal Parganas (1938) writes, "In the olden areas, from which he (the Santal) moved on at an earlier date, he seems to have done the first clearing of the jungle, and the first rough sloping of shapes and levels. The more civilised Bengali, Bihari and upcountry immigrant came at his heels, pushed him off the land by force, cajolery, trickery, seized upon his improvements by the application of larger capital or steadier labour developed the embryo bandhs and tanks into works of considerable size,"

In Dumka CD block, 36.14% of the total area was cultivable area and 18.77% of the cultivated area was irrigated area.

=== Backward Regions Grant Fund ===
Dumka district is listed as a backward region and receives financial support from the Backward Regions Grant Fund. The fund created by the Government of India is designed to redress regional imbalances in development. As of 2012, 272 districts across the country were listed under this scheme. The list includes 21 districts of Jharkhand.

== Transport ==
The Jasidih–Dumka–Rampurhat railway line is fully operational from June 2015. On the Dumka-Bhagalpur route while trains are running between Dumka and Barapalsi from June 2014 and between Bhagalpur and Hansdih from 2012, the stretch from Hansdiha to Barapalsi is yet to be completed (as in January 2016) .

== Education ==
Dumka CD block had 34 villages with pre-primary schools, 210 villages with primary schools, 60 villages with middle schools, 7 villages with secondary schools, 1 village with senior secondary school, 1 village with general degree college, 45 villages with no educational facility.
.*Senior secondary schools are also known as Inter colleges in Jharkhand

== Healthcare ==
Dumka CD block had 5 villages with primary health centres, 16 villages with primary health subcentres.
.*Private medical practitioners, alternative medicine etc. not included
