= Kathikund =

- Community development block
- Kathikund Wilderness area

- Coordinates: 24°21′32″N 87°25′11″E
- Country: India
- State: Jharkhand
- District: Dumka

Government
  - Type: Federal democracy

Area
  - Total: 306.20 km^{2} (118.22 sq mi)
- Elevation: 146 m (479 ft)

Population (2011)
  - Total: 71,458
  - Density: 233.37/km^{2} (604.43/sq mi)

Languages
  - Official: Hindi, Urdu

Literacy (2011)
  - Total literates: 31,703 (54.09%)
- Time zone: UTC+5:30 (IST)
- PIN: 814103 (Kathikund)
- Telephone/STD code: 06427
- Vehicle registration: JH 04
- Lok Sabha constituency: Dumka
- Vidhan Sabha constituency: Sikaripara
- Website: dumka.nic.in

Kathikund is a community development block that forms one of the administrative units in the Dumka Sadar subdivision of the Dumka district, Jharkhand state, India.

== Geography ==
Kathikund, the eponymous CD block headquarters, is located at 24°21′32″N 87°25′11″E.

It is located 23 km from Dumka, the district headquarters.

Dumka district is a plateau region. It is divided into four micro subregions. The Dumka-Godda Uplands covers Saraiyahat, Jarmundi, Jama, Ranishwar, Shikaripara and parts of Ramgarh, Dumka and Masalia CD blocks. Scattered hillocks with forests are spread over the region with elevation above mean sea level varying from 274 to 753 metres (899 to 2,470 ft). The Deoghar Uplands covers only parts of Masalia CD block. The area has large number of hillocks covered with forests. The Rajmahal Hills, spread over the north-eastern part of the district, covers Ramgarh, Dumka, Kathikund and Gopikandar CD blocks. The Pakur Uplands, in the eastern part of the district, with a height of 31 metres (102 ft) above mean sea level, covers parts of Gopikandar and Kathikund CD blocks. The two blocks, named last, also fall under the Damin-i-koh region of Santhal Parganas.

Kathikund CD block is bounded by Gopikandar CD block on the north, Pakuria CD block in Pakur district on the east, Shikaripara CD block on the south, Dumka and Ramgarh, Dumka CD blocks on the west.

Kathikund CD block has an area of 306.20 km^{2}.Kathikund police station serves this block. Headquarters of this CD block is at Kathikund.

== Demographics ==
=== Population ===
As per the 2011 Census of India Kathikund CD block had a total population of 71,458, all of which were rural. There were 35,598 (50%) males and 35,860 (50%) females. Population below 6 years was 12,841. Scheduled Castes numbered 1,753 (2.45%) and Scheduled Tribes numbered 45,4006 (63.54%).

=== Literacy ===
As per 2011 census the total number of literates in Kathikund CD Block was 31,703 (54.09% of the population over 6 years) out of which 19,074 (61%) were males and 12,629 (39%) were females. The gender disparity (the difference between female and male literacy rates) was 22%.

See also – List of Jharkhand districts ranked by literacy rate

Literacy in CD Blocks of
Dumka district
Saraiyahat – 58.64%
Jarmundi – 58.06%
Kathikund - 54.09%
Ramgarh – 55.45%
Gopikandar – 50.12%
Shikaripara – 57.10%
Ranishwar – 60.06%
Dumka – 70.08%
Jama – 61.88%
Masalia – 61.66%
Source: 2011 Census: CD Block Wise
Primary Census Abstract Data

=== Language and religion ===
Religions in Kathikund block (2011)
Religion	Percent
Hinduism	59.96%
Christianity	16.92%
Islam	14.15%
Sarna	8.58%
Other or not stated	0.48%

Languages of Kathikund block (2011)
1. Santali (55.5%)
2. Khortha (22.4%)
3. Malto (7.74%)
4. Urdu (6.03%)
5. Bengali (4.50%)
6. Hindi (1.67%)
7. Bhojpuri (1.13%)
8. Others (1.06%)

At the time of the 2011 census, 55.45% of the population spoke Santali, 22.42% Khortha, 7.74% Malto, 6.03% Urdu, 4.50% Bengali, 1.67% Hindi and 1.13% Bhojpuri as their first language. 9.15% of the population spoke 'Others' under Hindi.

== Rural poverty ==
60-70% of the population of Dumka district were in the BPL category in 2004–2005, being in the same category as Ranchi and Jamtara districts. Rural poverty in Jharkhand declined from 66% in 1993–94 to 46% in 2004–05. In 2011, it has come down to 39.1%.

== Economy ==
=== Livelihood ===
Livelihood
in Kathikund CD block
1. Cultivators (36.1%)
2. Agricultural labourers (51.1%)
3. Household industries (3.64%)
4. Other Workers (9.14%)

In Kathikund CD block in 2011, amongst the class of total workers, cultivators numbered 12,591 and formed 36.13%, agricultural labourers numbered 17,802 and formed 51.09%, household industry workers numbered 1,269 and formed 3.64% and other workers numbered 3,184 and formed 9.14%. Total workers numbered 34,846 and formed 48.76% of the total population. Non-workers numbered 36,612 and formed 51.24% of total population.

Note: In the census records a person is considered a cultivator, if the person is engaged in cultivation/ supervision of land owned. When a person who works on another person's land for wages in cash or kind or share, is regarded as an agricultural labourer. Household industry is defined as an industry conducted by one or more members of the family within the household or village, and one that does not qualify for registration as a factory under the Factories Act. Other workers are persons engaged in some economic activity other than cultivators, agricultural labourers and household workers. It includes factory, mining, plantation, transport and office workers, those engaged in business and commerce, teachers and entertainment artistes.

=== Infrastructure ===
There are 193 inhabited villages in Kathikund CD block. In 2011, 30 villages had power supply. 2 villages had tap water (treated/ untreated), 192 villages had well water (covered/ uncovered), 183 villages had hand pumps, and all villages had drinking water facility. 18 villages had post offices, 8 villages had sub post offices, 5 villages had telephones (land lines), 47 villages had public call offices and 88 villages had mobile phone coverage. 188 villages had pucca (paved) village roads, 17 villages had bus service (public/ private), 4 villages had railway stations, 1 village had autos/ modified autos, and 14 villages had tractors. 8 villages had bank branches, 7 villages had agricultural credit societies, 1 village had cinema/ video halls. 49 villages had public distribution system, 19 villages had weekly haat (market) and 46 villages had assembly polling stations.

=== Agriculture ===
Dumka district is a rural dominated area with a large population residing in the villages. It is a hilly district receiving considerably high rainfall (1088mm to 1244mm annual average), resulting in a considerable vegetative cover. Ruthless exploitation of forests has reduced them to bushes without any big trees. Only 6.42% of the agricultural lands are irrigated by wells and tanks. Major crops in the district are paddy, maize and wheat. The availability of land has been a major problem. "The Santals have played an important part in the reclamation of land." The District Gazetteer of the Santal Parganas (1938) writes, "In the olden areas, from which he (the Santal) moved on at an earlier date, he seems to have done the first clearing of the jungle, and the first rough sloping of shapes and levels. The more civilised Bengali, Bihari and upcountry immigrant came at his heels, pushed him off the land by force, cajolery, trickery, seized upon his improvements by the application of larger capital or steadier labour developed the embryo bandhs and tanks into works of considerable size,"

In Kathikund CD block, 28.52% of the total area was cultivable area and 8.00% of the cultivated area was irrigated area.

=== Backward Regions Grant Fund ===
Dumka district is listed as a backward region and receives financial support from the Backward Regions Grant Fund. The fund created by the Government of India is designed to redress regional imbalances in development. As of 2012, 272 districts across the country were listed under this scheme. The list includes 21 districts of Jharkhand.

== Non Governmental Organizations ==
SANMAT : A Chennai Based NGO/Civil Society named Sanmat working on public health issues & community health. Sanmat is also taking care of MESO Hospital, Kathikund by providing operation & management support to ITDA. Another program which is being run by Sanmat is to train different SHG and villagers to turn them to economically empowered by creating village level entrepreneurs. Sanmat is also supporting Jharkhand Skill Development Mission as Training Partner.

Nav Bharat Jagriti Kendra has been working in Khathikund since 2010 on disability related issue. Four blocks of Dumka have been covered under this program. There are basically four result areas are there in which NBJK is engaged in Kathikund block. This organization is working for the awareness regarding the causes and prevention of disability along with govt schemes related to disabled people. These aware generation activities are being done for disabled and non disabled people. This organization is working for livelihood of disabled people and their families. The organization is promoting to Person with disability who are doing their self small business. Micro credit program is also being implemented by the organization to insure the livelihood of person with disability. NBJK is working with disabled, Female and Male who are non disabled. Disabled specific groups, women groups and men groups are being formed. Many of the disabled people have joined to their federation which has been formed on block level and district level.

The Kathikund block has also had many other NGO's working in the area like the FPB, World Vision, Enriching Lives Inspiring Minds Foundation etc... Another NGO/Civil Society named Sanmat working on public health issues. Sanmat is also taking care of MESO Hospital, Kathikund by providing operation & management of Hospital.Another program which is being run by Sanmat is to train different SHG and villagers to turn them to social entrepreneurs.

== Education ==
Kathikund CD block had 60 villages with pre-primary schools, 168 villages with primary schools, 40 villages with middle schools, 4 villages with secondary schools, 23 villages with no educational facility.
.*Senior secondary schools are also known as Inter colleges in Jharkhand

== Healthcare ==
Kathikund CD block had 7 villages with primary health centres, 13 villages with primary health subcentres, 4 villages with maternity and child welfare centres, x village with TB clinic, 1 village with allopathic hospital, 3 villages with dispensaries, 2 villages with family welfare centres, 7 villages with medicine shops.
.*Private medical practitioners, alternative medicine etc. not included
