= Ranishwar =

Ranishwar Raneshwar
- Community development block
- Coordinates: 24°1′52″N 87°25′11″E
- Country: India
- State: Jharkhand
- District: Dumka district

Government
  - Type: Federal democracy

Area
  - Total: 346.24 km^{2} (133.68 sq mi)
- Elevation: 80 m (260 ft)

Population (2011)
  - Total: 101,667
  - Density: 293.63/km^{2} (760.50/sq mi)

Languages
  - Official: Hindi, Urdu
- Time zone: UTC+5:30 (IST)
- PIN: 814148
- Telephone code: 06434
- Vehicle registration: JH XX
- Sex ratio: 969 ♂/♀
- Literacy: 47.54%%
- Climate: warm-temperate (Köppen)
- Lok Sabha constituency: Dumka
- Vidhan Sabha constituency: Sikaripara
- Website: dumka.nic.in

Ranishwar is a community development block that forms an administrative division in the Dumka Sadar subdivision of the Dumka district in Jharkhand, India.

== Geography ==
Ranishwar is located at 24°1′52″N 87°25′11″E.

Ranishwar is 43 km from Dumka, the district headquarters.

Dumka district is a plateau region. It is divided into four micro subregions. The Dumka-Godda Uplands covers Saraiyahat, Jarmundi, Jama, Ranishwar, Shikaripara and parts of Ramgarh, Dumka and Masalia CD blocks. Scattered hillocks with forests are spread over the region with elevation above mean sea level varying from 274 to 753 metres (899 to 2,470 ft). The Deoghar Uplands covers only parts of Masalia CD block. The area has large number of hillocks covered with forests. The Rajmahal Hills, spread over the north-eastern part of the district, covers Ramgarh, Dumka, Kathikund and Gopikandar CD blocks. The Pakur Uplands, in the eastern part of the district, with a height of 31 metres (102 ft) above mean sea level, covers parts of Gopikandar and Kathikund CD blocks. The two blocks, named last, also fall under the Damin-i-koh region of Santhal Parganas.

Ranishwar CD block is bounded by Shikaripara CD block on the north, Mohammad Bazar CD block in Birbhum district, West Bengal, on the east, Suri I and Rajnagar CD blocks in Birbhum district on the south, and Masalia and Dumka on the west.

Ranishwar CD block has an area of 346.74 km^{2}.Ranishwar and Tongra police stations serve this block. Headquarters of this CD block is at Ranishwar village.

== Demographics ==
=== Population ===
As per the 2011 Census of India Ranishwar CD block had a total population of 101,667, all of which were rural. There were 51,115 (50%) males and 50,552 (50%) females. Population below 6 years was 15,478. Scheduled Castes numbered 7,978 (7.85%) and Scheduled Tribes numbered 45,890 (45.14%).

=== Literacy ===
Ranishwar has an average literacy rate of 47.54, lower than the national average of 74.4%: male literacy is 59.54% and, female literacy is 35.12%. In Dumka, 18% of the population is under 6 years of age. The gender disparity (the difference between female and male literacy rates) was 19.42%.

See also – List of Jharkhand districts ranked by literacy rate

Literacy in CD Blocks of
Dumka district
Saraiyahat – 58.64%
Jarmundi – 58.06%
Kathikund - 54.09%
Ramgarh – 55.45%
Gopikandar – 50.12%
Shikaripara – 57.10%
Ranishwar – 60.06%
Dumka – 70.08%
Jama – 61.88%
Masalia – 61.66%
Source: 2011 Census: CD Block Wise
Primary Census Abstract Data

=== Language and religion ===
Religions in Ranishwar block (2011)
Religion	Percent
Hinduism	75.34%
Islam	10.99%
Sarna	7.24%
Christianity	6.25%
Other or not stated	0.18%

Languages of Ranishwar block (2011)
1. Santali (41.6%)
2. Bengali (40.1%)
3. Khortha (9.99%)
4. Hindi (5.06%)
5. Malto (1.67%)
6. Others (1.50%)

At the time of the 2011 census, 41.63% of the population spoke Santali, 40.15% Bengali, 9.99% Khortha, 5.06% Hindi and 1.67% Malto as their first language.

== Rural poverty ==
60-70% of the population of Dumka district were in the BPL category in 2004–2005, being in the same category as Ranchi and Jamtara districts. Rural poverty in Jharkhand declined from 66% in 1993–94 to 46% in 2004–05. In 2011, it has come down to 39.1%.

== Economy ==
=== Livelihood ===
Livelihood
in Ranishwar CD block
1. Cultivators (21.8%)
2. Agricultural labourers (62.1%)
3. Household industries (3.18%)
4. Other Workers (12.9%)

In Raniswar CD block in 2011, amongst the class of total workers, cultivators numbered 9,829 and formed 21.84%, agricultural labourers numbered 27,928 and formed 62.07%, household industry workers numbered 1,430 and formed 3.18% and other workers numbered 5,809 and formed 12.91%. Total workers numbered 49,996 and formed 44.26% of the total population. Non-workers numbered 56,671 and formed 55.74% of total population.

Note: In the census records a person is considered a cultivator, if the person is engaged in cultivation/ supervision of land owned. When a person who works on another person's land for wages in cash or kind or share, is regarded as an agricultural labourer. Household industry is defined as an industry conducted by one or more members of the family within the household or village, and one that does not qualify for registration as a factory under the Factories Act. Other workers are persons engaged in some economic activity other than cultivators, agricultural labourers and household workers. It includes factory, mining, plantation, transport and office workers, those engaged in business and commerce, teachers and entertainment artistes.

=== Infrastructure ===
There are 191 inhabited villages in Ranishwar CD block. In 2011, 78 villages had power supply. 32 villages had tap water (treated/ untreated), 186 villages had well water (covered/ uncovered), 183 villages had hand pumps, and all villages had drinking water facility. 28 villages had post offices, 3 villages had sub post offices, 25 villages had telephones (land lines), 16 villages had public call offices and 81 villages had mobile phone coverage. 181 villages had pucca (paved) village roads, 42 villages had bus service (public/ private), 1 village had railway station, 1 village had autos/ modified autos, and 51 villages had tractors. 9 villages had bank branches, 4 villages had agricultural credit societies, 5 villages had cinema/ video halls, 5 villages had public library and public reading rooms. 60 villages had public distribution system, 11 villages had weekly haat (market) and 66 villages had assembly polling stations.

=== Agriculture ===
Dumka district is a rural dominated area with a large population residing in the villages. "Agriculture practices are the main source of income for the rural people of the district." It is a hilly district receiving considerably high rainfall (1088mm to 1244mm annual average), resulting in a considerable vegetative cover. Ruthless exploitation of forests has reduced them to bushes without any big trees. Only 6.42% of the agricultural lands are irrigated by wells and tanks. Major crops in the district are paddy, maize and wheat. The availability of land has been a major problem. "The Santals have played an important part in the reclamation of land." The District Gazetteer of the Santal Parganas (1938) writes, "In the olden areas, from which he (the Santal) moved on at an earlier date, he seems to have done the first clearing of the jungle, and the first rough sloping of shapes and levels. The more civilised Bengali, Bihari and upcountry immigrant came at his heels, pushed him off the land by force, cajolery, trickery, seized upon his improvements by the application of larger capital or steadier labour developed the embryo bandhs and tanks into works of considerable size,"

In Ranishwar CD block, 58.47% of the total area was cultivable area and 31.51% of the cultivated area was irrigated area.

=== Backward Regions Grant Fund ===
Dumka district is listed as a backward region and receives financial support from the Backward Regions Grant Fund. The fund created by the Government of India is designed to redress regional imbalances in development. As of 2012, 272 districts across the country were listed under this scheme. The list includes 21 districts of Jharkhand.

== Education ==
Ranishwar CD block had 14 villages with pre-primary schools, 167 villages with primary schools, 61 villages with middle schools, 6 villages with secondary schools, 3 villages with senior secondary schools, 1 village with general degree college, 23 villages with no educational facility.
.*Senior secondary schools are also known as Inter colleges in Jharkhand

Mayurakshi Gramin College, affiliated with Sido Kanhu Murmu University, was established at Ranishwar.

== Healthcare ==
Ranishwar CD block had 3 villages with primary health centres, 31 villages with primary health subcentres, 1 village with maternity and child welfare centre, x village with TB clinic, 2 villages with allopathic hospitals, 1 village with dispensary, 1 village with veterinary hospital, 1 villages with family welfare centre, 8 villages with medicine shops.
.*Private medical practitioners, alternative medicine etc. not included
