= Jarmundi =

- Community development block
- Jarmundi village area

- Coordinates: 24°23′31″N 87°3′23″E
- Country: India
- State: Jharkhand
- District: Dumka

Government
  - Type: Federal democracy

Area
  - Total: 393.57 km^{2} (151.96 sq mi)
- Elevation: 145 m (476 ft)

Population (2011)
  - Total: 168,163
  - Density: 427.28/km^{2} (1,106.6/sq mi)

Languages
  - Official: Hindi, Urdu

Literacy (2011)
  - Total literates: 80,283 (58.06%)
- Time zone: UTC+5:30 (IST)
- PIN: 814141 (Jarmundi)
- Telephone/STD code: 06431
- Vehicle registration: JH 04
- Lok Sabha constituency: Godda
- Vidhan Sabha constituency: Jarmundi
- Website: dumka.nic.in

Jarmundi is a community development block that forms an administrative division in the Dumka Sadar subdivision of the Dumka district, Jharkhand state, India.

== Geography ==
Jarmundi, the eponymous CD block headquarters, is located at 24°23′31″N 87°3′23″E.

It is located 27 km (17 mi) from Dumka, the district headquarters.

Dumka district is a plateau region. It is divided into four micro subregions. The Dumka-Godda Uplands covers Saraiyahat, Jarmundi, Jama, Ranishwar, Shikaripara and parts of Ramgarh, Dumka and Masalia CD blocks. Scattered hillocks with forests are spread over the region with elevation above mean sea level varying from 274 to 753 metres (899 to 2,470 ft). The Deoghar Uplands covers only parts of Masalia CD block. The area has large number of hillocks covered with forests. The Rajmahal Hills, spread over the north-eastern part of the district, covers Ramgarh, Dumka, Kathikund and Gopikandar CD blocks. The Pakur Uplands, in the eastern part of the district, with a height of 31 metres (102 ft) above mean sea level, covers parts of Gopikandar and Kathikund CD blocks. The two blocks, named last, also fall under the Damin-i-koh region of Santhal Parganas.

Jarmundi CD block is bounded by Saraiyahat CD block on the north, Ramgarh CD block on the east, Jama, Dumka CD block on the south, and Mohanpur and Sonaraithari CD blocks in Deoghar district on the west.

Jarmundi CD block has an area of 393.57 km^{2}.Jarmundi and Taljhari police stations serve this block. Headquarters of this CD block is at Jarmundi village.

== Demographics ==
=== Population ===
As per the 2011 Census of India Jarmundi CD block had a total population of 168,163, all of which were rural. There were 86,341 (51%) males and 82,822 (49%) females. Population below 6 years was 29,973. Scheduled Castes numbered 11,688 (6.95%) and Scheduled Tribes numbered 44,796 (26.64%).

=== Literacy ===
As per 2011 census the total number of literates in Jarmundi was 80,233 (58.06% of the population over 6 years) out of which 50,701 (63%) were males and 29,528 (37%) were females. The gender disparity (the difference between female and male literacy rates) was 26%.

See also – List of Jharkhand districts ranked by literacy rate

Literacy in CD Blocks of
Dumka district
Saraiyahat – 58.64%
Jarmundi – 58.06%
Kathikund - 54.09%
Ramgarh – 55.45%
Gopikandar – 50.12%
Shikaripara – 57.10%
Ranishwar – 60.06%
Dumka – 70.08%
Jama – 61.88%
Masalia – 61.66%
Source: 2011 Census: CD Block Wise
Primary Census Abstract Data

=== Language and religion ===
Religions in Jarmundi block (2011)
Religion	Percent
Hinduism	93.88%
Islam	4.72%
Christianity	0.67%
Sarna	0.58%
Other or not stated	0.15%

Languages of Jarmundi block (2011)
1. Khortha (63.9%)
2. Santali (23.3%)
3. Hindi (5.37%)
4. Bengali (3.44%)
5. Bhojpuri (1.47%)
6. 'Other' Hindi (0.98%)
7. Others (1.48%)

At the time of the 2011 census, 63.93% of the population spoke Khortha, 23.33% Santali, 5.37% Hindi, 3.44% Bengali and 1.47% Bhojpuri as their first language. 0.98% of the population spoke 'Others' under Hindi.

== Rural poverty ==
60-70% of the population of Dumka district were in the BPL category in 2004–2005, being in the same category as Ranchi and Jamtara districts. Rural poverty in Jharkhand declined from 66% in 1993–94 to 46% in 2004–05. In 2011, it has come down to 39.1%.

== Economy ==
=== Livelihood ===
Livelihood
in Jarmundi CD block
1. Cultivators (35.0%)
2. Agricultural labourers (50.8%)
3. Household industries (3.47%)
4. Other Workers (10.8%)

In Jarmundi CD block in 2011, amongst the class of total workers, cultivators numbered 29,177 and formed 34.98%, agricultural labourers numbered 42,331 and formed 50.75%, household industry workers numbered 2,891 and formed 3.47% and other workers numbered 9,013 and formed 10.81%. Total workers numbered 89,609 and formed 48.36% of the total population. Non-workers numbered 95,677 and formed 51.64% of total population.

Note: In the census records a person is considered a cultivator, if the person is engaged in cultivation/ supervision of land owned. When a person who works on another person's land for wages in cash or kind or share, is regarded as an agricultural labourer. Household industry is defined as an industry conducted by one or more members of the family within the household or village, and one that does not qualify for registration as a factory under the Factories Act. Other workers are persons engaged in some economic activity other than cultivators, agricultural labourers and household workers. It includes factory, mining, plantation, transport and office workers, those engaged in business and commerce, teachers and entertainment artistes.

=== Infrastructure ===
There are 470 inhabited villages in Jarmundi CD block. In 2011, 213 villages had power supply. 17 villages had tap water (treated/ untreated), 463 villages had well water (covered/ uncovered), 463 villages had hand pumps, and all villages had drinking water facility. 32 villages had post offices, 18 villages had sub post offices, 12 villages had telephones (land lines), 26 villages had public call offices and 272 villages had mobile phone coverage. 459 villages had pucca (paved) village roads, 24 villages had bus service (public/ private), 3 villages had railway stations, 5 villages had autos/ modified autos, and 77 villages had tractors. 16 villages had bank branches, 7 villages had agricultural credit societies, 2 villages had cinema/ video halls, 2 villages had public library and public reading rooms. 87 villages had public distribution system, 36 villages had weekly haat (market) and 110 villages had assembly polling stations.

=== Agriculture ===
Dumka district is a rural dominated area with a large population residing in the villages. "Agriculture practices are the main source of income for the rural people of the district." It is a hilly district receiving considerably high rainfall (1088mm to 1244mm annual average), resulting in a considerable vegetative cover. Ruthless exploitation of forests has reduced them to bushes without any big trees. Only 6.42% of the agricultural lands are irrigated by wells and tanks. Major crops in the district are paddy, maize and wheat. The availability of land has been a major problem. "The Santals have played an important part in the reclamation of land." The District Gazetteer of the Santal Parganas (1938) writes, "In the olden areas, from which he (the Santal) moved on at an earlier date, he seems to have done the first clearing of the jungle, and the first rough sloping of shapes and levels. The more civilised Bengali, Bihari and upcountry immigrant came at his heels, pushed him off the land by force, cajolery, trickery, seized upon his improvements by the application of larger capital or steadier labour developed the embryo bandhs and tanks into works of considerable size,"

In Jarmundi CD block, 80.75% of the total area was cultivable area and 64.13% of the cultivated area was irrigated area.

=== Backward Regions Grant Fund ===
Dumka district is listed as a backward region and receives financial support from the Backward Regions Grant Fund. The fund created by the Government of India is designed to redress regional imbalances in development. As of 2012, 272 districts across the country were listed under this scheme. The list includes 21 districts of Jharkhand.

== Transport ==
The Jasidih–Dumka–Rampurhat railway line is fully operational from June 2015. The Jasidih-Dumka sector was operational from 2011. Basukinath railway station is on this track.

== Education ==
Jarmundi CD block had 10 villages with pre-primary schools, 319 villages with primary schools, 102 villages with middle schools, 7 villages with secondary schools, 5 villages with senior secondary schools, 150 villages with no educational facility.
.*Senior secondary schools are also known as Inter colleges in Jharkhand

== Culture ==
Hindus in large numbers gather at Basukuinath temple to worship Lord Shiva. Basukinath is around 25 km north-west of Dumka.

== Healthcare ==
Jarmundi CD block had 11 villages with primary health centres, 43 villages with primary health subcentres, 2 villages with maternity and child welfare centres, 1 village with TB clinic, 3 villages with allopathic hospitals, 5 villages with dispensaries, 1 village with veterinary hospital, 4 villages with family welfare centres, 18 villages with medicine shops.
.*Private medical practitioners, alternative medicine etc. not included
