= Sarasdangal =

- Village
- Location in Jharkhand, India Sarasdangal (India)
- Coordinates: 24°12′21″N 87°35′37″E
- Country: India
- State: Jharkhand
- District: Dumka
- Elevation: 146 m (479 ft)

Languages
  - Official: Hindi, Santali, Bengali

Literacy (2011)
- Time zone: UTC+5:30 (IST)
- PIN: 816103(Sarasdangal)
- Vehicle registration: JH 04
- Lok Sabha constituency: Dumka
- Vidhan Sabha constituency: Sikaripara
- Website: dumka.nic.in

Sarasdangal is a village situated in the Dumka District in Jharkhand State, Eastern India. It is situated on the Dumka - Rampurhat Bus Route. It is under regional control of the Shikaripara Police Station. The main business of Sarasdangal village is producing, processing, storing and transporting Stone Chips and gravel. The village is also surrounded by small local farmland. The quarries, and stone processing facilities are located on the west side of the village along road 133A. People of all religions live in this village.

== Facilities ==
The village has electricity. The village has gravel processing facilities.

== Education ==
The village has one government school with classes up to year 7. The nearest high school is 12 km away in Shikaripara.
