= Shikaripara =

- Community development block
- Shikaripara village area animal

- Coordinates: 24°14′21″N 87°28′37″E
- Country: India
- State: Jharkhand
- District: Dumka

Government
  - Type: Federal democracy
- Elevation: 146 m (479 ft)

Population (2011)
  - Total: 131,464

Languages
  - Official: Hindi, Urdu

Literacy (2011)
  - Total literates: 61,968 (57.10%)
- Time zone: UTC+5:30 (IST)
- PIN: 816118 (Shikaripara)
- Telephone/STD code: 06427
- Vehicle registration: JH 04
- Lok Sabha constituency: Dumka
- Vidhan Sabha constituency: Sikaripara
- Website: dumka.nic.in

Shikaripara is a community development block in India that forms an administrative division in the Dumka Sadar subdivision of the Dumka district, Jharkhand state, India.

== Geography ==
Shikaripara, the eponymous CD block headquarters, is located at 24°14′21″N 87°28′37″E.

It is located 27 km from Dumka, the district headquarters. Shikaripara is also a police station under Dumka district.

Dumka district is a plateau region. It is divided into four micro subregions. The Dumka-Godda Uplands covers Saraiyahat, Jarmundi, Jama, Ranishwar, Shikaripara and parts of Ramgarh, Dumka and Masalia CD blocks. Scattered hillocks with forests are spread over the region with elevation above mean sea level varying from 274 to 753 metres (899 to 2,470 ft). The Deoghar Uplands covers only parts of Masalia CD block. The area has large number of hillocks covered with forests. The Rajmahal Hills, spread over the north-eastern part of the district, covers Ramgarh, Dumka, Kathikund and Gopikandar CD blocks. The Pakur Uplands, in the eastern part of the district, with a height of 31 metres (102 ft) above mean sea level, covers parts of Gopikandar and Kathikund CD blocks. The two blocks, named last, also fall under the Damin-i-koh region of Santhal Parganas.

Shikaripara is bounded by Kathikund CD block and Pakuria CD block in Pakur district on the north, Rampurhat I CD block in Birbhum district, West Bengal, on the east, Ranishwar CD block on the south, and Dumka CD block on the west.

Shikaripara CD block has an area of 438.25 km^{2}.Shikaripara police station serves this block. Headquarters of this CD block is at Shikaripara.

== Demographics ==
=== Population ===
As per the 2011 Census of India Shikaripara CD block had a total population of 131,464, all of which were rural. There were 65,723 (50%) males and 65,741 (50%) females. Population below 6 years was 22,931. Scheduled Castes numbered 5,035 (3.83%) and Scheduled Tribes numbered 79,522 (60.49%).

=== Literacy ===
As per 2011 census the total number of literates in Shikaripara CD block was 61,968 (57.10% of the population over 6 years) out of which 37,037 (60%) were males and 24,931 (40%) were females. The gender disparity (the difference between female and male literacy rates) was 20%.

See also – List of Jharkhand districts ranked by literacy rate

Literacy in CD Blocks of
Dumka district
Saraiyahat – 58.64%
Jarmundi – 58.06%
Kathikund - 54.09%
Ramgarh – 55.45%
Gopikandar – 50.12%
Shikaripara – 57.10%
Ranishwar – 60.06%
Dumka – 70.08%
Jama – 61.88%
Masalia – 61.66%
Source: 2011 Census: CD Block Wise
Primary Census Abstract Data

=== Language and religion ===
Religions in Shikaripara block (2011)
Religion	Percent
Hinduism	58.13%
Islam	19.60%
Christianity	13.62%
Sarna	8.31%
Other or not stated	0.34%

Languages of Shikaripara block (2011)
1. Santali (56.7%)
2. Khortha (25.4%)
3. Bengali (10.5%)
4. Malto (3.36%)
5. Urdu (1.24%)
6. Bhojpuri (1.23%)
7. Others (1.60%)

At the time of the 2011 census, 56.69% of the population spoke Santali, 25.36% Khortha, 10.52% Bengali, 3.36% Malto, 1.24% Urdu and 1.23% Bhojpuri as their first language.

== Rural poverty ==
60-70% of the population of Dumka district were in the BPL in 2004–2005, being in the same category as Ranchi and Jamtara districts. Rural poverty in Jharkhand declined from 66% in 1993–94 to 46% in 2004–05. In 2011, it has come down to 39.1%.

== Economy ==
=== Livelihood ===
Livelihood
in Shikaripara CD block
1. Cultivators (29.4%)
2. Agricultural labourers (43.5%)
3. Household industries (1.98%)
4. Other Workers (25.1%)

In Shikaripara CD block in 2011, amongst the class of total workers, cultivators numbered 16,829 and formed 29.43%, agricultural labourers numbered 24,898 and formed 43.55%, household industry workers numbered 1,131 and formed 1.98% and other workers numbered 14,317 and formed 25.05%. Total workers numbered 57,175 and formed 43.49% of the total population. Non-workers numbered 74,289 and formed 56.51% of total population.

Note: In the census records a person is considered a cultivator, if the person is engaged in cultivation/ supervision of land owned. When a person who works on another person's land for wages in cash or kind or share, is regarded as an agricultural labourer. Household industry is defined as an industry conducted by one or more members of the family within the household or village, and one that does not qualify for registration as a factory under the Factories Act. Other workers are persons engaged in some economic activity other than cultivators, agricultural labourers and household workers. It includes factory, mining, plantation, transport and office workers, those engaged in business and commerce, teachers and entertainment artistes.

=== Infrastructure ===
There are 242 inhabited villages Shikaripara CD block. In 2011, 41 villages had power supply. 17 villages had tap water (treated/ untreated), 238 villages had well water (covered/ uncovered), 227 villages had hand pumps, and all villages had drinking water facility. 30 villages had post offices, 15 villages had sub post offices, 13 villages had telephones (land lines), 17 villages had public call offices and 111 villages had mobile phone coverage. 236 villages had pucca (paved) village roads, 53 villages had bus service (public/ private), 6 villages had railway stations, 5 villages had autos/ modified autos, and 65 villages had tractors. 18 villages had bank branches, 13 villages had agricultural credit societies, 1 village had cinema/ video halls, 1 village had public library and public reading room. 81 villages had public distribution system, 22 villages had weekly haat (market) and 86 villages had assembly polling stations.

=== Agriculture ===
Dumka district is a rural dominated area with a large population residing in the villages. "Agriculture practices are the main source of income for the rural people of the district." It is a hilly district receiving considerably high rainfall (1088mm to 1244mm annual average), resulting in a considerable vegetative cover. Ruthless exploitation of forests has reduced them to bushes without any big trees. Only 6.42% of the agricultural lands are irrigated by wells and tanks. Major crops in the district are paddy, maize and wheat. The availability of land has been a major problem. "The Santals have played an important part in the reclamation of land." The District Gazetteer of the Santal Parganas (1938) writes, "In the olden areas, from which he (the Santal) moved on at an earlier date, he seems to have done the first clearing of the jungle, and the first rough sloping of shapes and levels. The more civilised Bengali, Bihari and upcountry immigrant came at his heels, pushed him off the land by force, cajolery, trickery, seized upon his improvements by the application of larger capital or steadier labour developed the embryo bandhs and tanks into works of considerable size,"

In Shikaripara CD block, 40.75% of the total area was cultivable area and 18.37% of the cultivated area was irrigated area.

=== Coal ===
The Brahmani Coalfields in the valley of the Brahmani River is the largest coalfield in the Santhal Parganas.

=== Backward Regions Grant Fund ===
Dumka district is listed as a backward region and receives financial support from the Backward Regions Grant Fund. The fund created by the Government of India is designed to redress regional imbalances in development. As of 2012, 272 districts across the country were listed under this scheme. The list includes 21 districts of Jharkhand.

== Transport ==
The 65 km Dumka-Rampurhat section was opened in June 2015, thereby marking the completion of the Jasidih–Dumka–Rampurhat railway line, most of which was ready and operational much earlier. There is a Ambajora Shikaripara railway station at Shikaripara. The Highway no. 122A pass through Shikaripara, connecting Dumka and Rampurhat town.

== Education ==
Shikaripara CD block had 20 villages with pre-primary schools, 215 villages with primary schools, 77 villages with middle schools, 11 villages with secondary schools, 5 villages with senior secondary schools, 1 village with general degree college, 26 villages with no educational facility.
.*Senior secondary schools are also known as Inter colleges in Jharkhand

Shikaripara College, affiliated with Sido Kanhu Murmu University, was established at Shikaripara.

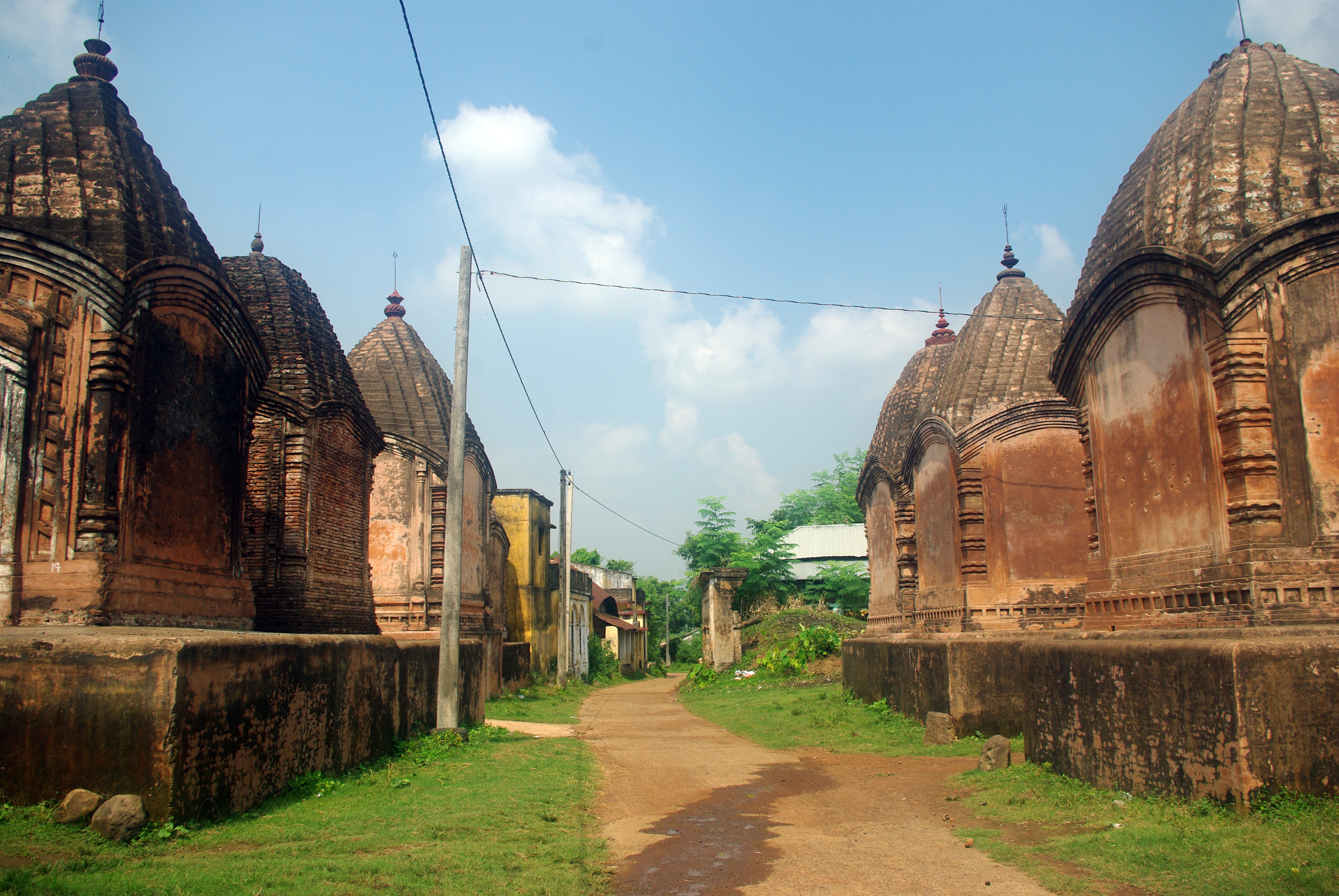
Some of the Maluti temples

== Culture ==
Maluti temples at Maluti is a group of 72 temples, built in 17-19th century, with extensive terracotta decoration.

== Healthcare ==
Shikaripara CD block had 7 villages with primary health centres, 22 villages with primary health subcentres, 4 villages with maternity and child welfare centres, 1 village with TB clinic, 2 villages with allopathic hospitals, 3 villages with dispensaries, 1 village with veterinary hospital, 3 villages with family welfare centres, 20 villages with medicine shops.

.*Private medical practitioners, alternative medicine etc. not included
