= Jarmundi, Dumka =

Jarmundi
- Village
- Jarmundi village photos

- Location in Jharkhand, India Jarmundi (India)
- Coordinates: 24.398564°N 87.046389°E
- Country: India
- State: Jharkhand
- District: Dumka

Languages (*For language details see Jarmundi#Language and religion)
  - Official: Hindi, Urdu
- Time zone: UTC+5:30 (IST)
- PIN: 814141
- Telephone/ STD code: 06431
- Lok Sabha constituency: Godda
- Vidhan Sabha constituency: Jarmundi
- Website: dumka.nic.in

Jarmundi is a village in the Jarmundi CD block in the Dumka Sadar subdivision of Dumka district in the Indian state of Jharkhand.

== Geography ==
Cities, towns and locations in the Deoghar, Dumka and Jamtara districts in Santhal Pargana Division
M: Municipality, CT: census town, R: Rural/ Urban centre, D: Dam,
Owing to space constraints in the small map, the actual locations in a larger map may vary slightly

=== Location ===
Jarmundi is located at 24.3987°N 87.046389°E.

In the map of Jarmundi CD block in the District Census Handbook, Dumka, Jarmundi is shown as being part of Basukinath Nagar Palika.

=== Overview ===
The map shows a large area, which is a plateau with low hills, except in the eastern portion where the Rajmahal hills intrude into this area and the Ramgarh hills are there. The south-western portion is just a rolling upland. The entire area is overwhelmingly rural with only small pockets of urbanisation.

Note: The full screen map is interesting. All places marked on the map are linked in the full screen map and one can easily move on to another page of his/her choice. Enlarge the full screen map to see what else is there – one gets railway connections, many more road connections and so on.

== Civic administration ==
=== Police station ===
There is a police station at Jarmundi.

=== CD block HQ ===
Headquarters of Jarmundi CD block is at Jarmundi village.

== Transport ==
Basukinath railway station is on the Jasidih-Dumka-Rampurhat line.

== Education ==
Baba Basukinath Parwati Inter College, at Basukinath, is a Hindi-medium coeducational institution established in 2000. It has facilities for teaching in classes XI and XII.

St. Joseph's School Jarmundi is a Hindi-medium coeducational institution. It has facilities for teaching from class I to class XII.

Model School Jarmundi is an English-medium coeducational institution established in 2011. It has facilities for teaching from class VI to class XII.

== Culture ==
Hindus in large numbers gather at Basukuinath temple to worship Lord Shiva.
