= Tongra =

- Village
- Location in Jharkhand, India Tongra (India)
- Coordinates: 24.049131°N 87.259422°E
- Country: India
- State: Jharkhand
- District: Dumka

Population (2011)
  - Total: 989

Languages (*For language details see Ranishwar#Language and religion)
  - Official: Hindi, Urdu
- Time zone: UTC+5:30 (IST)
- PIN: 814148
- Telephone/ STD code: 06434
- Lok Sabha constituency: Dumka
- Vidhan Sabha constituency: Shikaripara
- Website: dumka.nic.in

Tongra is a village in the Ranishwar CD block in the Dumka Sadar subdivision of the Dumka district in the Indian state of Jharkhand.

== Geography ==
Cities, towns and locations in the Deoghar, Dumka and Jamtara districts in Santhal Pargana Division
M: Municipality, CT: census town, R: Rural/ Urban centre, D: Dam,
Owing to space constraints in the small map, the actual locations in a larger map may vary slightly

=== Location ===
Tongra is located at 24.049131°N 87.259422°E.

=== Overview ===
The map shows a large area, which is a plateau with low hills, except in the eastern portion where the Rajmahal hills intrude into this area and the Ramgarh hills are there. The south-western portion is just a rolling upland. The area is overwhelmingly rural with only small pockets of urbanisation.

Note: The full screen map is interesting. All places marked on the map are linked in the full screen map and one can easily move on to another page of his/her choice. Enlarge the full screen map to see what else is there – one gets railway connections, many more road connections and so on.

=== Area ===
Tongra has an area of 443.51 hectares (1,095.9 acres).

== Demographics ==
According to the 2011 Census of India, Tongra had a population of 989, of which 476 (48%) were males and 513 (52%) were females. Population in the age range 0–6 years was 116. The total number of literate persons in Tongra was 873 (54.64% of the population over 6 years).

== Civic administration ==
=== Police station ===
There is a police station at Tongra.

== Education ==
Government Middle School Tongra is a Hindi-medium coeducational institution established in 1975. It has facilities for teaching from class I to class VIII.
