= Ranishwar, Dumka =

Ranishwar
- Village
- Location in Jharkhand, India Ranishwar (India)
- Coordinates: 24.0381°N 87.4167°E
- Country: India
- State: Jharkhand
- District: Dumka

Languages .*For language details see Ranishwar#Language and religion
  - Official: Hindi, Urdu
- Time zone: UTC+5:30 (IST)
- Lok Sabha constituency: Dumka
- Vidhan Sabha constituency: Sikaripara
- Website: dumka.nic.in

Ranishwar is a village in the Ranishwar CD block in the Dumka Sadar subdivision of the Dumka district in the Indian state of Jharkhand.

== Etymology ==
The village has an old temple dedicated to Hindu God Shiva also known as "Ranishwar Nath" from which the village derives its name.

== Geography ==
Cities, towns and locations in the Deoghar, Dumka and Jamtara districts in Santhal Pargana Division
M: Municipality, CT: census town, R: Rural/ Urban centre, D: Dam,
Owing to space constraints in the small map, the actual locations in a larger map may vary slightly

=== Location ===
Ranishwar is located at 24.0381°N 87.4167°E.

In the map of Ranishwar CD block in the District Census Handbook, Dumka, Ranishwar is shown as being part of Amrapara mouza (MDDS PLCN - 371187).

=== Overview ===
The map shows a large area, which is a plateau with low hills, except in the eastern portion where the Rajmahal hills intrude into this area and the Ramgarh hills are there. The south-western portion is just a rolling upland. The entire area is overwhelmingly rural with only small pockets of urbanisation.

Note: The full screen map is interesting. All places marked on the map are linked in the full screen map and one can easily move on to another page of his/her choice. Enlarge the full screen map to see what else is there – one gets railway connections, many more road connections and so on.

=== Area ===
Amrapara has an area of 19.90 hectares (49.2 acres).

== Demographics ==
According to the 2011 Census of India, Amrapara had a total population of 91, of which 45 (49%) were males and 46 (51%) were females. Population in the age range 0–6 years was 16. The total number of literate persons in Amrapara was 75 (61.33% of the population over 6 years).

== Civic administration ==
=== Police station ===
There is a police station at Ranishwar.

=== CD block HQ ===
Headquarters of Ranishwar CD block is at Ranishwar village.

== Transport ==
Ranishwar is connected with road to the neighboring city. Since July 2011 Dumka is connected with newly built Jasidih - Dumka railway line. Since then Ranishwar got a new connectivity to the Howrah-New Delhi line, via Dumka-Jasidih. Although there is an ongoing work on new railway line, which will connect Dumka to Bhagalpur (Bihar) and Rampurhat (west Bangal) in coming years.

But Buses are the preferred mode of transport and are run by both government agencies and private operators. Dumka has good connectivity to it neighboring district with buses. There is luxury night bus service between Dumka - Ranchi and Kolkata. The following are Railway stations close to Ranishwar

1. Siuri Railway Station located at a distance of 21 kilometres (13 mi)
2. Chinpal Railway Station located at a distance of 26 kilometres (16 mi)
3. Gadadharpur Railway Station located at a distance of 28 kilometres (17 mi)
4. Sainthia Railway Station located at a distance of 29 kilometres (18 mi)
5. Dumka Railway Station located at a distance of 40 kilometres (25 mi)

== Education ==
Mayurakshi Gramin College, affiliated with Sido Kanhu Murmu University, was established at Ranishwar.

Ranishwar has some CBSE schools, and government schools following NCERT syllabus. A list of schools in and around Ranishwar are:

1. Ranigram Middle School established in the year 1901, is one of the oldest school in Dumka district. the headmistress of this school Mrs Bharati Chatterjee.
2. Raghunathpur Govt. High School
3. UPG Middle School Rangalia
4. Govt. Middle School Kumirdaha follows NCERT syllabus
5. Sadipur Govt. Middle School
6. Govt. Middle School Dhanbasa follows NCERT syllabus
7. Sido Kanhu High school Affiliated to CBSE board, New Delhi
8. '"M G College"' Mayurakshi Gramin College, Ranishwar
9. '"Girls School Ranishwar"
