= Masalia, Dumka (village) =

Masalia
- Village
- Masalia village area photo

- Location in Jharkhand, India Masalia (India)
- Coordinates: 24.158056°N 87.178454°E
- Country: India
- State: Jharkhand
- District: Dumka

Population (2011)
  - Total: 399

Languages (*For language details see Masalia, Dumka#Language and religion)
  - Official: Hindi, Urdu
- Time zone: UTC+5:30 (IST)
- PIN: 814167
- Telephone/ STD code: 06434
- Lok Sabha constituency: Dumka
- Vidhan Sabha constituency: Dumka
- Website: dumka.nic.in

Masalia is a village in the Masalia, Dumka CD block in the Dumka Sadar subdivision of the Dumka district in the Indian state of Jharkhand.

== Geography ==
Cities, towns and locations in the Deoghar, Dumka and Jamtara districts in Santhal Pargana Division
M: Municipality, CT: census town, R: Rural/ Urban centre, D: Dam,
Owing to space constraints in the small map, the actual locations in a larger map may vary slightly

=== Location ===
Masalia is located at 24.158056°N 87.178454°E.

=== Overview ===
The map shows a large area, which is a plateau with low hills, except in the eastern portion where the Rajmahal hills intrude into this area and the Ramgarh hills are there. The south-western portion is just a rolling upland. The entire area is overwhelmingly rural with only small pockets of urbanisation.

Note: The full screen map is interesting. All places marked on the map are linked in the full screen map and one can easily move on to another page of his/her choice. Enlarge the full screen map to see what else is there – one gets railway connections, many more road connections and so on.

=== Area ===
Masalia has an area of 229 hectares (570 acres).

== Demographics ==
According to the 2011 Census of India, Masalia had a total population of 399, of which 199 (50%) were males and 200 (50%) were females. Population in the age range 0–6 years was 62. The total number of literate persons in Masalia was 337 (59.35% of the population over 6 years).

== Civic administration ==
=== Police station ===
There is a police station at Masalia.

=== CD block HQ ===
Headquarters of Masalia, Dumka CD block is at Masalia village.

== Education ==
Kasturba Gandhi Balika Vidyalaya, Masalia, is a Hindi-medium girls only institution established in 2005. It has facilities for teaching from class VI to class XII.

Government High School Masalia is a Hindi-medium coeducational institution established in 1956. It has facilities for teaching from class IX to class XII.

Model School Masalia is a Hindi-medium coeducational institution established in 2011. It has facilities for teaching from class VI to class XII.

Project Girls High School Masalia is a Hindi medium girls only institution established in 1985. It has facilities for teaching in classes IX and X.
