= Ramgarh, Dumka (village) =

Ramgarh
- Village
- Location in Jharkhand, India Ramgarh (India)
- Coordinates: 24.561111°N 87.249444°E
- Country: India
- State: Jharkhand
- District: Dumka

Population (2011)
  - Total: 961

Languages (*For language details see Ramgarh, Dumka#Language and religion)
  - Official: Hindi, Urdu
- Time zone: UTC+5:30 (IST)
- PIN: 814102
- Telephone/ STD code: 06431
- Lok Sabha constituency: Dumka
- Vidhan Sabha constituency: Jama

Ramgarh is a village in the Ramgarh, Dumka CD block in the Dumka Sadar subdivision of the Dumka district in the Indian state of Jharkhand.

== Geography ==
Cities, towns and locations in the Deoghar, Dumka and Jamtara districts in Santhal Pargana Division
M: Municipality, CT: census town, R: Rural/ Urban centre, D: Dam,
Owing to space constraints in the small map, the actual locations in a larger map may vary slightly

=== Location ===
Ramgarh is located at 24.561111°N 87.249444°E.

=== Overview ===
The map shows a large area, which is a plateau with low hills, except in the eastern portion where the Rajmahal hills intrude into this area and the Ramgarh hills are there. The south-western portion is just a rolling upland. The entire area is overwhelmingly rural with only small pockets of urbanisation.

Note: The full screen map is interesting. All places marked on the map are linked in the full screen map and one can easily move on to another page of his/her choice. Enlarge the full screen map to see what else is there – one gets railway connections, many more road connections and so on.

=== Area ===
Ramgarh has an area of 83 hectares (210 acres).

== Demographics ==
According to the 2011 Census of India, Ramgarh had a total population of 961, of which 473 (49%) were males and 488 (51%) were females. The population in the age range 0–6 years was 135. The total number of literate persons in Ramgarh was 826 (82.57% of the population over 6 years).

== Civic administration ==
=== Police station ===
There is a police station at Ramgarh.

=== CD block HQ ===
The headquarters of Ramgarh, Dumka CD block is at Ramgarh village.

== Education ==
Kasturba Gandhi Balika Vidyalaya, Ramgarh, is a Hindi-medium girls only institution established in 2005. It has facilities for teaching from class VI to class XII.

Government High School Ramgarh is a Hindi-medium coeducational institution established in 1956. It has facilities for teaching from class IX to class XII.

Model School Ramgarh is an English-medium coeducational institution established in 2011. It has facilities for teaching from class VI to class XII.

Project Girls High School Ramgarh is a Hindi-medium girls only institution established in 1984. It has facilities for teaching in class IX and X.
