= Taljhari, Dumka =

Taljhari
- Village
- Location in Jharkhand, India Taljhari (India)
- Coordinates: 24.423944°N 86.917389°E
- Country: India
- State: Jharkhand
- District: Dumka

Population (2011)
  - Total: 342

Languages (*For language details see Jarmundi#Language and religion)
  - Official: Hindi, Urdu
- Time zone: UTC+5:30 (IST)
- PIN: 814120
- Telephone/ STD code: 06431
- Lok Sabha constituency: Godda
- Vidhan Sabha constituency: Jarmundi
- Website: dumka.nic.in

Taljhari is a village in the Jarmundi CD block in the Dumka Sadar subdivision of the Dumka district in the Indian state of Jharkhand.

== Geography ==
Cities, towns and locations in the Deoghar, Dumka and Jamtara districts in Santhal Pargana Division
M: Municipality, CT: census town, R: Rural/ Urban centre, D: Dam,
Owing to space constraints in the small map, the actual locations in a larger map may vary slightly

=== Location ===
Taljhari is located at 24.423944°N 86.971389°E.

=== Area ===
Taljhari has an area of 79.61 hectares (196.7 acres).

=== Overview ===
The map shows a large area, which is a plateau with low hills, except in the eastern portion where the Rajmahal hills intrude into this area and the Ramgarh hills are there. The south-western portion is just a rolling upland. The entire area is overwhelmingly rural with only small pockets of urbanisation.

Note: The full screen map is interesting. All places marked on the map are linked in the full screen map and one can easily move on to another page of his/her choice. Enlarge the full screen map to see what else is there – one gets railway connections, many more road connections and so on.

== Demographics ==
According to the 2011 Census of India, Taljhari had a total population of 342, of which 188 (55%) were males and 154 (45%) were females. Population in the age range 0–6 years was 38. The total number of literate persons in Taljhari was 304 (70.72% of the population over 6 years).

== Civic administration ==
=== Police station ===
There is a police station at Taljhari.

== Transport ==
Ghormara railway station, on the Jasidih-Dumka-Rampurhat line, is located nearby.

== Education ==
Government High School Taljhari is a Hindi-medium coeducational institution established in 1911. It has facilities for teaching from class I to class XII.
