= Kathikund, Dumka =

Kathikund
- Village
- Location in Jharkhand, India Kathikund (India)
- Coordinates: 24.358889°N 87.419722°E
- Country: India
- State: Jharkhand
- District: Dumka

Population (2011)
  - Total: 297

Languages (*For language details see Kathikund#Language and religion)
  - Official: Hindi, Urdu
- Time zone: UTC+5:30 (IST)
- PIN: 814103
- Telephone/ STD code: 06427
- Lok Sabha constituency: Rajmahal
- Vidhan Sabha constituency: Litipara
- Website: dumka.nic.in

Kathikund is a village in the Kathikund CD block in the Dumka Sadar subdivision of the Dumka district in the Indian state of Jharkhand.

== Geography ==
Cities, towns and locations in the Deoghar, Dumka and Jamtara districts in Santhal Pargana Division
M: Municipality, CT: census town, R: Rural/ Urban centre, D: Dam,
Owing to space constraints in the small map, the actual locations in a larger map may vary slightly

=== Location ===
Kathikund is located at 24.358889°N 87.419722°E.

=== Overview ===
The map shows a large area, which is a plateau with low hills, except in the eastern portion where the Rajmahal hills intrude into this area and the Ramgarh hills are there. The south-western portion is just a rolling upland. The entire area is overwhelmingly rural with only small pockets of urbanisation.

Note: The full screen map is interesting. All places marked on the map are linked in the full screen map and one can easily move on to another page of his/her choice. Enlarge the full screen map to see what else is there – one gets railway connections, many more road connections and so on.

=== Area ===
Bara Kathikund has an area of 137.52 hectares (339.8 acres).

Chhota Kathikund has an area of 65.71 hectares (162.4 acres).

== Demographics ==
According to the 2011 Census of India, Bara Kathikund had a total population of 270, of which 145 (54%) were males and 125 (46%) were females. Population in the age range 0–6 years was 57. The total number of literate persons in Bara Kathikund was 213 (65.73% of the population over 6 years).

According to the 2011 Census of India, Chhota Kathikund had a total population of 27, of which 14 (52%) were males and 13 (48%) were females. Population in the age range 0–6 years was 1. The total number of literate persons in Chhota Kathikund was 26 (80.77% of the population over 6 years).

== Civic administration ==
=== Police station ===
There is a police station at Kathikund.

=== CD block HQ ===
Headquarters of Kathikund CD block is at Kathikund village.

== Education ==
Kasturba Gandhi Balika Vidyalaya, Kathikund, is a Hindi-medium girls only institution established in 2007. It has facilities for teaching from class VI to class XII.

Government High School Kathikund is a Hindi-medium coeducational institution established in 1955. It has facilities for teaching from class IX to class XII.

Dr. J.M. Inter College Kathikund is a Hindi-medium coeducational institution established in 1985. It has facilities for teaching in classes XI and XII.

Project Girls High School Kathikund is a Hindi-medium girls only institution established in 1984. It has facilities for teaching from class VIII to class X.
