= Shikaripara, Dumka =

Shikaripara
- Village
- Shikaripara village area trees

- Location in Jharkhand, India Shikaripara (India)
- Coordinates: 24.244167°N 87.470944°E
- Country: India
- State: Jharkhand
- District: Dumka

Population (2011)
  - Total: 2,646

Languages (*For language details see Shikaripara#Language and religion)
  - Official: Hindi, Urdu
- Time zone: UTC+5:30 (IST)
- PIN: 816118
- Telephone/ STD code: 06427
- Lok Sabha constituency: Dumka
- Vidhan Sabha constituency: Sikaripara
- Website: dumka.nic.in

Shikaripara is a village in the Shikaripara CD block in the Dumka Sadar subdivision of the Dumka district in the Indian state of Jharkhand.

== Geography ==
Cities, towns and locations in the Deoghar, Dumka and Jamtara districts in Santhal Pargana Division
M: Municipality, CT: census town, R: Rural/ Urban centre, D: Dam,
Owing to space constraints in the small map, the actual locations in a larger map may vary slightly

=== Location ===
Shikaripara is located at 24.244167°N 87.470944°E.

=== Area ===
Shikaripara has an area of 150 hectares (370 acres).

=== Overview ===
The map shows a large area, which is a plateau with low hills, except in the eastern portion where the Rajmahal hills intrude into this area and the Ramgarh hills are there. The south-western portion is just a rolling upland. The entire area is overwhelmingly rural with only small pockets of urbanisation.

Note: The full screen map is interesting. All places marked on the map are linked in the full screen map and one can easily move on to another page of his/her choice. Enlarge the full screen map to see what else is there – one gets railway connections, many more road connections and so on.

== Demographics ==
According to the 2011 Census of India, Shikaripara had a total population of 2,646, of which 1,347 (51%) were males and 1,299 (49%) were females. Population in the age range 0–6 years was 321. The total number of literate persons in Shikaripara was 2,325 (82.28% of the population over 6 years).

== Civic administration ==
=== Police station ===
There is a police station at Shikaripara.

=== CD block HQ ===
Headquarters of Shikaripara CD block is at Shikaripara village.

== Transport ==
Ambajora Shikaripara railway station is on the Jasidih-Dumka-Rampurhat line.

== Education ==
Government High School Shikaripara is a Hindi-medium coeducational institution established in 1962. It has facilities for teaching from class IX to class XII.

Shikaripara Inter College is a Hindi-medium coeducational institution established in 1982. It has facilities for teaching in classes XI and XII.

Model School Shikaripara is an English-medium coeducational institution. It has facilities for teaching from class VIII to class XII.

St. Rita Girls High School Shikaripara is a Hindi-medium girls only institution established in 1980. It has facilities for teaching from class VII to class X.

Urmila Ideal Public School is a Hindi-medium coeducational school established in 1989. It has facilities for teaching from class I to class X.
