= Gopikandar, Dumka =

Gopikandar
- Village
- Gopikandar Rural places

- Location in Jharkhand, India Gopikandar (India)
- Coordinates: 24.436111°N 87.482167°E
- Country: India
- State: Jharkhand
- District: Dumka

Population (2011)
  - Total: 1,293

Languages (*For language details see Gopikandar#Language and religion)
  - Official: Hindi, Urdu
- Time zone: UTC+5:30 (IST)
- PIN: 814103
- Telephone/ STD code: 06427
- Lok Sabha constituency: Rajmahal
- Vidhan Sabha constituency: Litipara
- Website: dumka.nic.in

Gopikandar is a village in the Gopikandar CD block in the Dumka Sadar subdivision of the Dumka district in the Indian state of Jharkhand.

== Geography ==
Cities, towns and locations in the Deoghar, Dumka and Jamtara districts in Santhal Pargana Division
M: Municipality, CT: census town, R: Rural/ Urban centre, D: Dam,
Owing to space constraints in the small map, the actual locations in a larger map may vary slightly

=== Location ===
Gopikandar is located at 24.436111°N 87.249444°E.

=== Overview ===
The map shows a large area, which is a plateau with low hills, except in the eastern portion where the Rajmahal hills intrude into this area and the Ramgarh hills are there. The south-western portion is just a rolling upland. The entire area is overwhelmingly rural with only small pockets of urbanisation.

Note: The full screen map is interesting. All places marked on the map are linked in the full screen map and one can easily move on to another page of his/her choice. Enlarge the full screen map to see what else is there – one gets railway connections, many more road connections and so on.

=== Area ===
Gopikandar has an area of 137.52 hectares (339.8 acres).

== Demographics ==
According to the 2011 Census of India, Gopikandar had a total population of 1,293, of which 654 (51%) were males and 639 (49%) were females. Population in the age range 0–6 years was 186. The total number of literate persons in Gopikandar was 1,107 (64.77% of the population over 6 years).

== Civic administration ==
=== Police station ===
There is a police station at Gopikandar.

=== CD block HQ ===
Headquarters of Gopikandar CD block is at Gopikandar village.

== Education ==
Kasturba Gandhi Balika Vidyalaya, Gopikandar, is a Hindi-medium girls only institution established in 2005. It has facilities for teaching from class VI to class XII.

Government High School Gopikandar is a Hindi-medium coeducational institution established in 1960. It has facilities for teaching from class I to class XII.

Project Girls High School Gopikandar is a Hindi-medium girls only institution established in 1984. It has facilities for teaching from class VI to class X.

St. Aloysius High School is a Hindi-medium boys only institution established in 1954. It has facilities for teaching from class I to class X.
