= Jama (name) =

- Gender: Male
- Language: Somali

Jama (Somali: Jaamac, Arabic: جامع) is a common Somali male name. The name is usually given to boys born on the blessed Islamic day of Friday (jumu’ah).

Typically, the name is found in the Northern regions of Greater Somalia.

== Given name ==
- Jama Ali Jama (died 2025), Somali politician in the state of Puntland
- Jama Ali Korshel, Major General and former Head of the Somali Police Force
- Jama Garad Ali, traditional Dhulbahante clan chief
- Jama Elmi Kadiye, Somali poet (1950–2023)
- Jama Musse Jama, Somali ethnomathematician and author
- Jama Gure Qobey, Somali politician

== Surname ==
- Abdirahman Jama Barre, Somali politician; former Foreign Minister and Finance Minister of Somalia
- Ahmed Sheikh Jama, Somali academician, writer, poet and politician
- Asha Jama, Somali-Canadian social activist, and former TV reporter and journalist
- Farah Ali Jama, former Puntland Minister of Finance
- Farah Mohamed Jama Awl, Somali writer
- Kayse Jama, Somali-American politician
- Maya Jama, British television and radio presenter
- Mohammed Ahamed Jama, Norwegian-Somali footballer; plays for Tromsdalen UIL
- Nathif Jama Adam, Somali banker, writer and politician
- Osman Jama Ali, Somali politician and former Prime Minister of Somalia
- Salah Hassan Jama, former chief of the Somali Army
- Salah Jama, the Deputy Prime Minister of the Federal Government of Somalia
- Sarah Jama, Somali-Canadian politician
- Shire Jama Ahmed, Somali linguist; devised Latin script for transcribing the Somali language
- Sisipho Jama, South African politician
