= Jama, Dumka (village) =

Jama
- Village
- Location in Jharkhand, India Jama (India)
- Coordinates: 24.368333°N 87.264444°E
- Country: India
- State: Jharkhand
- District: Dumka

Population (2011)
  - Total: 843

Languages (*For language details see Jama, Dumka#Language and religion)
  - Official: Hindi, Urdu
- Time zone: UTC+5:30 (IST)
- PIN: 814110
- Telephone/ STD code: 06431
- Lok Sabha constituency: Dumka
- Vidhan Sabha constituency: Jama
- Website: dumka.nic.in

Jama is a village in the Jama community development block in the Dumka Sadar subdivision of the Dumka district in the Indian state of Jharkhand.

== Geography ==
Cities, towns and locations in the Deoghar, Dumka and Jamtara districts in Santhal Pargana Division
M: Municipality, CT: census town, R: Rural/ Urban centre, D: Dam,
Owing to space constraints in the small map, the actual locations in a larger map may vary slightly

=== Location ===
Jama is located at 24.368333°N 87.264444°E.

=== Overview ===
The map shows a large area, which is a plateau with low hills, except in the eastern portion where the Rajmahal hills intrude into this area and the Ramgarh hills are there. The south-western portion is just a rolling upland. The entire area is overwhelmingly rural with only small pockets of urbanisation.

Note: The full screen map is interesting. All places marked on the map are linked in the full screen map and one can easily move on to another page of his/her choice. Enlarge the full screen map to see what else is there – one gets railway connections, many more road connections and so on.

=== Area ===
Jama has an area of 161 hectares (400 acres).

== Demographics ==
According to the 2011 Census of India, Jama had a total population of 843, of which 413 (49%) were males and 430 (51%) were females. Population in the age range 0–6 years was 143. The total number of literate persons in Jama was 700 (67.00% of the population over 6 years).

== Civic administration ==
=== Police station ===
There is a police station at Jama.

=== CD block HQ ===
Headquarters of Jama, Dumka CD block is at Jama village.

== Education ==
Kasturba Gandhi Balika Vidyalaya, Jama, is a Hindi-medium girls only institution established in 2007. It has facilities for teaching from class VI to class XII.

Government High School Jama at Jarpura is a Hindi-medium coeducational institution established in 1969. It has facilities for teaching from class IX to class XII.
