= Dudhani, Dumka =

Dudhani
- Census Town
- Location in Jharkhand, India Dudhani (India)
- Coordinates: 24.278367°N 87.240778°E
- Country: India
- State: Jharkhand
- District: Dumka

Area
  - Total: 1.13 km^{2} (0.44 sq mi)

Population (2011)
  - Total: 71,117
  - Density: 62,900/km^{2} (163,000/sq mi)

Languages (*For language details see Dumka (community development block)#Language and religion)
  - Official: Hindi, Urdu
- Time zone: UTC+5:30 (IST)
- PIN: 814110
- Telephone/ STD code: 06434
- Lok Sabha constituency: Dumka
- Vidhan Sabha constituency: Dumka
- Website: dumka.nic.in

Dudhani is a census town in Dumka CD block in Dumka subdivision of Dumka district in the Indian state of Jharkhand.

== Geography ==
Cities, towns and locations in the Deoghar, Dumka and Jamtara districts in Santhal Pargana Division
M: Municipality, CT: census town, R: Rural/ Urban centre, D: Dam,
Owing to space constraints in the small map, the actual locations in a larger map may vary slightly

=== Location ===
Dudhani is located at 24.278367°N 87.240778°E.

=== Overview ===
The map shows a large area, which is a plateau with low hills, except in the eastern portion where the Rajmahal hills intrude into this area and the Ramgarh hills are there. The south-western portion is just a rolling upland. The entire area is overwhelmingly rural with only small pockets of urbanisation.

Note: The full screen map is interesting. All places marked on the map are linked in the full screen map and one can easily move on to another page of his/her choice. Enlarge the full screen map to see what else is there – one gets railway connections, many more road connections and so on.

=== Area ===
Dudhani has an area of 1.13 km^{2}.

== Demographics ==
According to the 2011 Census of India, Dudhani had a total population of 7,117, of which 3,761 (53%) were males and 3,356 (47%) were females. Population in the age range 0–6 years was 940. The total number of literate persons in Dudhani was 6,177 (84.91% of the population over 6 years).

== Infrastructure ==
According to the District Census Handbook 2011, Dumka, Dudhani covered an area of 1.13 km^{2}. Among the civic amenities, it had 59 km roads with both open and closed drains, the protected water supply involved uncovered well, hand pump. It had 1,128 domestic electric connections. Among the medical facilities, it had 15 hospitals, 1 dispensary, 1 health centre, 1 family welfare centre, 1 maternity and child welfare centre, 1 maternity home, 1 nursing home, 3 charitable hospital/ nursing homes, 1 veterinary hospital, 50 medicine shops. Among the educational facilities it had 10 primary schools, 8 middle schools, 5 secondary schools, 3 senior secondary schools, 1 general degree college. Among the social, cultural and recreational facilities it had 2 orphanage homes, 1 working women's hostel, 1 stadium, 2 cinema theatres, 2 auditorium/ public halls, 2 public libraries, 2 reading rooms. An important item it produced was furniture. It had the branch offices of 5 nationalised bank, 3 private commercial banks, 4 cooperative bank, 5 agricultural credit society, 3 non-agricultural credit societies.

== Transport ==
Dumka railway station, on the Jasidih-Dumka-Rampurhat line, is located nearby.

== Education ==
St. Mary's is a Hindi-medium coeducational institution established in 2002. It has facilities for teaching from class I to class X.

Government Middle School Dudhani is a Hindi-medium coeducational institution established in 1919. It has facilities for teaching from class I to class VIII.

Modern English School is an English-medium coeducational institution established in 2001. It has facilities for teaching from class I to class VI.
