= Jama, Iran =

Jama جما
- Village
- Location within Iran
- Coordinates: 31°01′36″N 61°47′19″E
- Country: Iran
- Province: Sistan and Baluchestan
- County: Hirmand
- Bakhsh: Central
- Rural District: Dust Mohammad

Population (2006)
  - Total: 365
- Time zone: UTC+3:30 (IRST)
  - Summer (DST): UTC+4:30 (IRDT)

Jama (Persian: جما, also Romanized as Jamā; also known as Ḩājjī Jamā‘ and Jom‘eh) is a village in Dust Mohammad Rural District, in the Central District of Hirmand County, Sistan and Baluchestan Province, Iran. At the 2006 census, its population was 365, in 78 families.
