= Purana Dumka =

Purana Dumka Purani Dumka
- Census Town
- Location in Jharkhand, India Purana Dumka (India)
- Coordinates: 24.256367°N 87.237278°E
- Country: India
- State: Jharkhand
- District: Dumka

Area
  - Total: 1.15 km^{2} (0.44 sq mi)

Population (2011)
  - Total: 10,034
  - Density: 8,730/km^{2} (22,600/sq mi)

Languages (*For language details see Dumka (community development block)#Language and religion)
  - Official: Santali Hindi, Urdu
- Time zone: UTC+5:30 (IST)
- PIN: 814110
- Telephone/ STD code: 06434
- Lok Sabha constituency: Dumka
- Vidhan Sabha constituency: Dumka
- Website: dumka.nic.in

Purana Dumka (also spelled as Purani Dumka) is a census town in Dumka CD block in Dumka subdivision of Dumka district in the Indian state of Jharkhand.

== Geography ==
Cities, towns and locations in the Deoghar, Dumka and Jamtara districts in Santhal Pargana Division
M: Municipality, CT: census town, R: Rural/ Urban centre, D: Dam,
Owing to space constraints in the small map, the actual locations in a larger map may vary slightly

=== Location ===
Purana Dumka is located at 24.256367°N 87.237278°E.

=== Overview ===
The map shows a large area, which is a plateau with low hills, except in the eastern portion where the Rajmahal hills intrude into this area and the Ramgarh hills are there. The south-western portion is just a rolling upland. The entire area is overwhelmingly rural with only small pockets of urbanisation.

Note: The full screen map is interesting. All places marked on the map are linked in the full screen map and one can easily move on to another page of his/her choice. Enlarge the full screen map to see what else is there – one gets railway connections, many more road connections and so on.

=== Area ===
Purana Dumka has an area of 1.15 km^{2}.

== Demographics ==
According to the 2011 Census of India, Purana Dumka had a total population of 10,034, of which 5,343 (53%) were males and 4,691 (47%) were females. Population in the age range 0–6 years was 1,387. The total number of literate persons in Purana Dumka was 8,647 (83.17% of the population over 6 years).

== Infrastructure ==
According to the District Census Handbook 2011, Dumka, Purani Dumka covered an area of 1.15 km^{2}. Among the civic amenities, it had 50 km roads with both open and closed drains, the protected water supply involved uncovered well, hand pump. It had 1,591 domestic electric connections, 125 road light points. Among the medical facilities, it had 4 hospitals, 1 dispensary, 1 health centre, 1 family welfare centre, 2 maternity and child welfare centres, 2 maternity homes, 2 nursing home, 2 veterinary hospital, 1 medicine shop. Among the educational facilities it had 4 primary schools, 1 middle school. Two important items it produced were furniture, earthen pots. It had the branch offices of 1 nationalised bank, 1 agricultural credit society.

== Transport ==
Dumka railway station, on the Jasidih-Dumka-Rampurhat line, is located nearby.
