= Rasikpur =

- Census Town
- Location in Jharkhand, India Rasikpur (India)
- Coordinates: 24.288367°N 87.255278°E
- Country: India 24.288367,87.255278
- State: Jharkhand
- District: Dumka

Area
  - Total: 1.62 km^{2} (0.63 sq mi)

Population (2011)
  - Total: 8,320
  - Density: 5,140/km^{2} (13,300/sq mi)

Languages (*For language details see Dumka (community development block)#Language and religion)
  - Official: Hindi, Urdu
- Time zone: UTC+5:30 (IST)
- PIN: 814101
- Telephone/ STD code: 06434
- Lok Sabha constituency: Dumka
- Vidhan Sabha constituency: Dumka
- Website: dumka.nic.in

Rasikpur is a census town in Dumka CD block in Dumka subdivision of Dumka district in the Indian state of Jharkhand.

== Geography ==
Cities, towns and locations in the Deoghar, Dumka and Jamtara districts in Santhal Pargana Division
M: Municipality, CT: census town, R: Rural/ Urban centre, D: Dam,
Owing to space constraints in the small map, the actual locations in a larger map may vary slightly

=== Location ===
Rasikpur is located at 24.288367°N 87.255278°E.

=== Overview ===
The map shows a large area, which is a plateau with low hills, except in the eastern portion where the Rajmahal hills intrude into this area and the Ramgarh hills are there. The south-western portion is just a rolling upland. The entire area is overwhelmingly rural with only small pockets of urbanisation.

Note: The full screen map is interesting. All places marked on the map are linked in the full screen map and one can easily move on to another page of his/her choice. Enlarge the full screen map to see what else is there – one gets railway connections, many more road connections and so on.

=== Area ===
Rasikpur has an area of 1.62 km^{2}.

== Demographics ==
According to the 2011 Census of India, Rasikpur had a total population of 8,320, of which 4,257 (51%) were males and 4,063 (49%) were females. Population in the age range 0–6 years was 1,246. The total number of literate persons in Rasikpur was 7,074 (77.61% of the population over 6 years).

== Infrastructure ==
According to the District Census Handbook 2011, Dumka, Rasikpur covered an area of 1.62 km^{2}. Among the civic amenities, it had 8 km roads with both open and closed drains, the protected water supply involved uncovered well, hand pump. It had 1,185 domestic electric connections, 10 road lighting points. Among the educational facilities it had 6 primary schools, 1 middle school, 1 secondary school. Among the social, cultural and recreational facilities it had x working women’s hostels. An important item it produced was furniture. It had the branch offices of 1 nationalised bank.

== Transport ==
Dumka railway station, on the Jasidih-Dumka-Rampurhat line, is located nearby.

== Education ==
Government Middle School Rasikpur is a Hindi-medium coeducational institution stablished in 1925. It has facilities for teaching from class I to class VIII.

St. Xavier’s is an English-medium school in Rasikpur.
