= Damin-i-koh =

Historical Indian region

Damin-i-koh (or sometimes referred to simply as Damin) was the name given to the forested hilly areas of Rajmahal hills broadly in the area of present Sahebganj, Pakur and Godda districts in the Indian state of Jharkhand.

== Etymology ==
Damin-i-koh is a Persian word meaning the skirts of the hills.

== History ==
The Damin-i-koh was a densely forested and hilly area. Even in the valleys, there was hardly any human interference except for an occasional Paharia village. That was the situation for centuries. There were three groups of Paharia primitive tribes, namely the Sauria Paharias, Kumarbhag Paharias, and the Mal Paharias. They had been living in the Rajmahal Hills, since when it is difficult to trace. They lived mostly in hill tracts. Prior to the arrival of the British, the Paharias led a life undisturbed by the mighty empires reigning in the region. That was mostly the result of their geographical isolation. The Mughals never seem to have conquered the area, possibly because they failed to penetrate into the deeply forested hilly tracts. They were hill-locked and completely isolated from the outside world. They were also never in any way subordinate to the British Raj till around the end of eighteenth century.

The main problem that faced the British in the early years of their rule in the area was that the Paharias had become bandits and dacoits in the declining years of Muslim rule, and lawlessness prevailed in the region. The pacification of the Paharias and their conversion into a law-abiding people was a major achievement of the early British administration under people such as Captain Brooke, Captain Browne, and Augustus Cleveland. The Santals first began to move into the hills and forests of what was later called Santhal Parganas, towards the end of the 18th century.

The Santals are the most numerous tribe in eastern India. According to their traditions, they were a wandering tribe until they settled down in Chhotanagpur and the adjacent districts. That was around the middle of the 18th century. Towards the end of the century, as the pressure of population was keenly felt and the jungles were being cleared, they moved up towards the virgin forests in and around the Rajmahal Hills. The Permanent Settlement of 1793 forced the landlords to improve productivity of the land. The Santals were increasingly used for land reclamation and improvement. In 1832, the government set apart a large area in Damin-i-Koh for the settlement of the Santals. The population in this tract increased from 3,000 in 1838 to 82,795 in 1851. The intention of the British administration in permanently settling the Santals in Damin-i-koh was to reclaim the dense forested region. The industrious Santals were accorded a warm welcome to carry out this arduous task.

The Santhal rebellion of 1855 led to the formation of Santhal Parganas, which till then was administratively part of Birbhum district.

== See also ==
- Kajangala
