= Rajmahal hills =

Hills in Jharkhand, India

Rajmahal Hills
- Hills
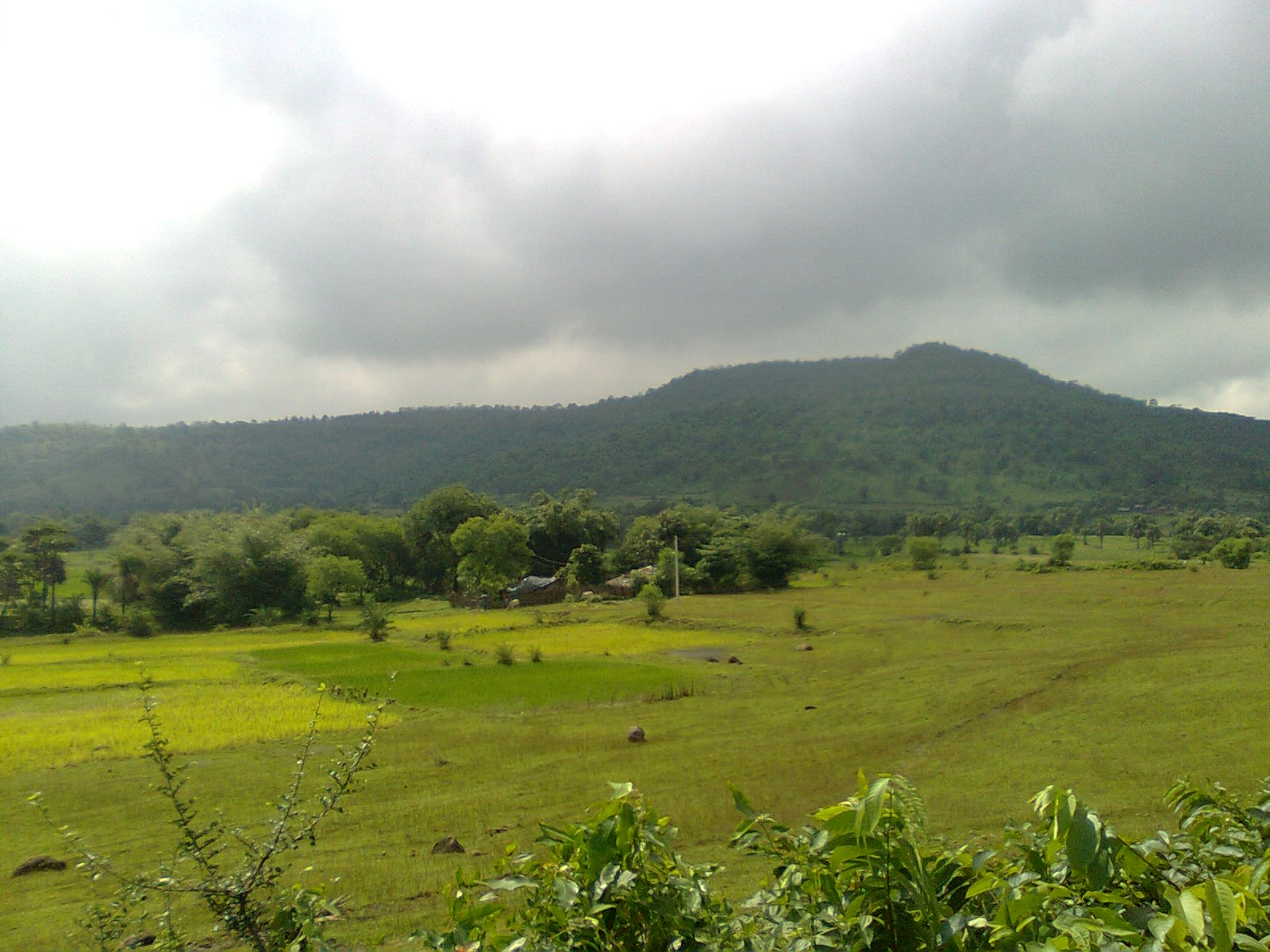

- Location within Jharkhand
- Coordinates: 25.132°N 87.617°E
- Location: Jharkhand, India

National Geological Monuments of India
- Official name: Plant Fossil bearing Inter-trappean beds of Rajmahal Formation
- Designated: 1976
- Designated by: Geological Survey of India

The Rajmahal Hills are located in the Santhal Pargana division of Jharkhand, India, and form part of the Rajmahal Traps, which were created by extensive volcanic activity during the Jurassic period. The Intertrappean Beds of the Rajmahal Formation contain a significant assemblage of plant fossils and have been designated a National Geological Monument by the Geological Survey of India.

== Geography ==
The Rajmahal Hills span over 2,600 km^{2} (1,000 sq mi) across the Santhal Pargana division of northeastern Jharkhand. The hills form an arc extending from northeast to southwest, approximately 190 km (120 mi) south of the Ganges, between Rajmahal and Dumka. Their elevation reaches a maximum of 567 m (1,860 ft), with an average elevation of 134 m (440 ft). The hills are inhabited by the Sauria Paharia people while the surrounding valleys are predominantly populated by the Santhal people.

== Geology ==
The Rajmahal Traps constitute a volcanic igneous province formed by multiple layers of solidified lava. The traps developed along the eastern continental margin of India following the rifting of Gondwanaland. Subsequent deformation of the upper lava sequence produced graben structures. The traps are predominantly composed of tholeiitic basalt, quartz and olivine tholeiites, and alkali basalt. Between the lava flows are the Intertrappean Beds, which consist mainly of sedimentary rocks such as siltstone, claystone, and shale. The Rajmahal Hills form the type area of the Rajmahal Group, a sequence of volcanic rocks associated with Jurassic volcanic activity in the region north of the Ganges delta.

== Fossils ==
The Intertrappean Beds of the Rajmahal Hills area contain a significant assemblage of plant fossils dating to the Cretaceous period (about 145 to 68 Ma). The fossil-bearing site has been designated a National Geological Monument by the Geological Survey of India. Some of the fossils are preserved at the Birbal Sahni Institute of Palaeosciences in Lucknow. However, the fossil deposits face potential threats from mining activities, following the state government's grant of mining leases in the area to private companies in 2018.
