= List of Scheduled Tribes in West Bengal =

Tribal List of West Bengal

Scheduled Tribes (also known as "tribals" or "adibasi/adivasi") are specific indigenous peoples whose status is acknowledged to some formal degree by national legislation. Scheduled tribes of the Indian state of West Bengal, as recognized by the Constitution of the Indian Republic; a total of 40 distinct tribes. Among those 40 tribes 3 tribes are "Particularly Vulnerable Tribal Groups" (PTGs).

== Overview ==
As per 2001 census scheduled tribes numbering 4,406,794 persons constituted 5.5 per cent of the total population of the state. Santals constitute more than half (51.8 per cent) of the total ST population of the state. Oraons (14 per cent), Mundas (7.8 per cent), Bhumij (7.6 per cent) and Kora (3.2 per cent) are the other major STs having sizeable population. Along with Santal, they constitute nearly 85 per cent of the state's total ST population. The Lodhas, Mahalis, Bhutias, Bedias, and Savars are the remaining STs, and having population of one per cent or more as per 2001 census report.

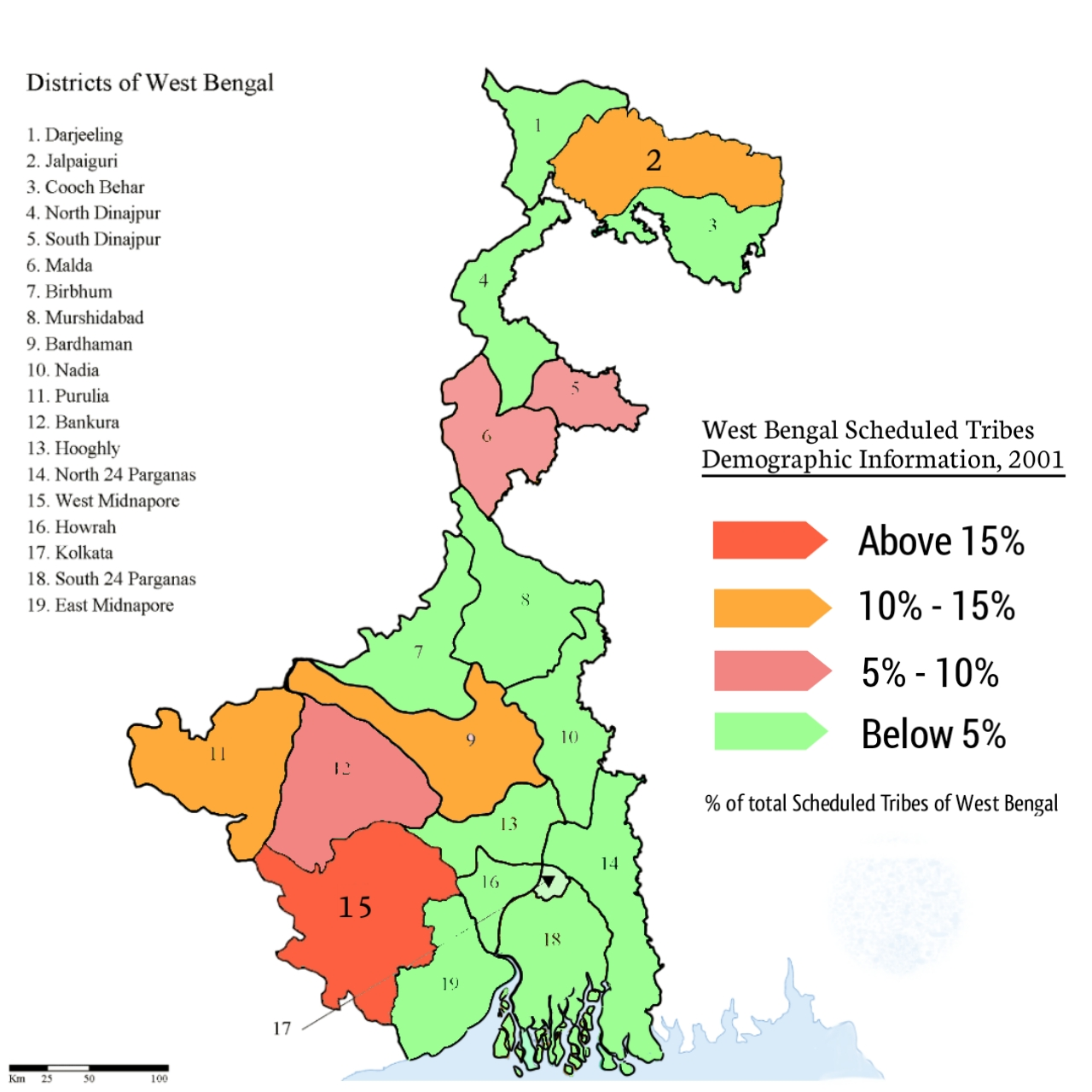
District wise Scheduled Tribes demographic map of West Bengal

More than half of the total ST population of the state is concentrated in Medinipur, Jalpaiguri, Purulia, and Bardhaman districts. Of the remaining districts, Bankura, Malda, Uttar Dinajpur, and Dakshin Dinajpur have sizable ST population.

== List of tribes ==
As per the Constitution (Scheduled Tribes) Order, 1950, the following were listed as scheduled tribes in West Bengal.

1. Asur
2. Baiga
3. Badia, Bediya
4. Bhumij
5. Bhutia, Sherpa, Toto, Dukpa, Kagatay, Tibetan, Yolmo
6. Birhor
7. Birjia
8. Chakma
9. Chero
10. Chik Baraik
11. Garo
12. Gond
13. Gorait
14. Hajang
15. Ho
16. Karmali
17. Kharwar
18. Khond
19. Kisan
20. Kora
21. Korwa
22. Lepcha
23. Lodha, Kheria, Kharia
24. Lohara, Lohra
25. Magh
26. Mahali
27. Mahli
28. Mal Pahariya
29. Mech
30. Mru
31. Munda
32. Nagesia
33. Oraon
34. Parhaiya
35. Rabha
36. Santal
37. Sauria Paharia
38. Savar
39. Limbu (Subba)
40. Tamang

== Demographics ==
| Scheduled Tribe | Historical Population | | | | | Demographics based on latest census | | | | | | |
| Scheduled Tribe | Historical Population | | | | | Latest Population (2011) | Sex ratio | Literacy (%) | | | Main worker | Marginal worker |
| Scheduled Tribe | 1961 | 1971 | 1981 | 1991 | 2001 | Latest Population (2011) | Sex ratio | Total | Male | Female | Main worker | Marginal worker |
|---|---|---|---|---|---|---|---|---|---|---|---|---|
| Asur | —N/a | 611 | 4,286 | 3,864 | 4,050 | 4,864 | 1,024 | 45.1 | 55.2 | 35 | 73 | 27 |
| Baiga | 4 | —N/a | 1,606 | 7,624 | 11,681 | 13,423 | 984 | 61.4 | 72.8 | 50 | 51.9 | 48.1 |
| Bedia, Bediya | 1,191 | 3,339 | 29,396 | 44,875 | 55,979 | 88,772 | 973 | 63.5 | 72.5 | 54.2 | 61.2 | 38.8 |
| Bhumij | 91,289 | 169,426 | 233,906 | 291,808 | 336,436 | 376,296 | 980 | 59.5 | 70.7 | 48.1 | 49.8 | 50.2 |
| Bhutia, Sherpa, Toto, Ukpa, Kagatay, Tibetan, Yolmo | 23,595 | 33,912 | 40,192 | 48,196 | 60,091 | 66,627 | 1,002 | 81.1 | 86.7 | 75.5 | 73.7 | 26.3 |
| Birhor | 100 | —N/a | 658 | 855 | 1,017 | 2,241 | 906 | 58.2 | 69.3 | 46.1 | 63.9 | 36.1 |
| Birjia | —N/a | 16 | 913 | 1,238 | 1,654 | 1,123 | 960 | 48.4 | 60 | 36.2 | 64.3 | 35.7 |
| Chakma | 1,379 | 2,927 | 141 | 320 | 642 | 466 | 966 | 76.8 | 83.8 | 69.5 | 84.4 | 15.6 |
| Chero | 559 | 175 | 1,648 | 2,283 | 1,968 | 5,477 | 1,034 | 62.7 | 73.2 | 52.5 | 75.6 | 24.4 |
| Chik Baraik | —N/a | 1,627 | 12,624 | 16,030 | 17,824 | 21,376 | 1,014 | 62.6 | 74 | 51.2 | 72.4 | 27.6 |
| Garo | 2,535 | 2,627 | 3,206 | 3,673 | 1,915 | 2,039 | 1,045 | 77.8 | 81.8 | 73.9 | 64.5 | 35.5 |
| Gond | 735 | 46 | 4,923 | 5,966 | 9,826 | 13,535 | 900 | 74.8 | 82.9 | 65.9 | 77.8 | 22.2 |
| Gorait | 425 | 481 | 2,191 | 3,024 | 1,436 | 2,498 | 990 | 32 | 41.2 | 22.6 | 51.2 | 48.8 |
| Hajong | 426 | 244 | 1,081 | 1,527 | 597 | 621 | 882 | 74.4 | 85.3 | 61.9 | 82.8 | 17.2 |
| Ho | 1,075 | 1,036 | 3,202 | 11,640 | 15,540 | 23,483 | 992 | 54.3 | 65.2 | 43.2 | 57.4 | 42.6 |
| Karmali | 1,023 | 94 | 1,418 | 7,101 | 1,317 | 2,466 | 974 | 67.9 | 79.6 | 55.9 | 63.8 | 36.2 |
| Kharwar | 1,142 | 134 | 11,726 | 20,514 | 17,625 | 20,270 | 942 | 64.5 | 73.8 | 54.7 | 65.2 | 34.8 |
| Khond | 41 | —N/a | 639 | 829 | 226 | 660 | 953 | 59.I | 67.2 | 50.7 | 85.3 | 14.7 |
| Kisan | 3 | 716 | 5,370 | 5,827 | 4,788 | 98,434 | 934 | 53.4 | 62.4 | 43.9 | 58.8 | 41.2 |
| Kora | 62,029 | 93,586 | 96,835 | 113,564 | 142,789 | 159,404 | 1,000 | 56.5 | 68 | 45.1 | 54.8 | 45.2 |
| Korwa | 2,891 | 3,222 | 2,493 | 4,948 | 5,371 | 2,912 | 1,012 | 53.9 | 62.8 | 45.3 | 74.3 | 25.7 |
| Lepcha | 15,309 | 14,568 | 23,408 | 27,888 | 32,377 | 33,962 | 981 | 82.4 | 86.8 | 77.9 | 59.5 | 40.5 |
| Lodha, Kharia, Kharia | 40,898 | 45,906 | 53,718 | 68,095 | 84,966 | 108,707 | 988 | 45.5 | 54.6 | 36.2 | 55.2 | 44.8 |
| Lohara, Lohra | 3,031 | 2,388 | 23,799 | 29,750 | 20,683 | 24,783 | 997 | 55.3 | 65.4 | 45.2 | 68.5 | 31.5 |
| Magh | 790 | 3,257 | 1,020 | 4,332 | 8,214 | 8,032 | 989 | 88.3 | 91.6 | 85.1 | 87.8 | 12.2 |
| Mahali | 28,233 | 47,247 | 50,288 | 69,542 | 76,102 | 81,594 | 1,003 | 55 | 66.3 | 43.6 | 63.5 | 36.5 |
| Mahli | 5,075 | 998 | 10,827 | 19,075 | 1,831 | 2,609 | 963 | 50.7 | 59.8 | 41.3 | 53.9 | 46.1 |
| Mal Pahariya | 15,706 | 31,018 | 17,020 | 34,302 | 37,440 | 44,538 | 992 | 42.8 | 49 | 36.5 | 74.1 | 25.9 |
| Mech | 13,915 | 10,862 | 26,959 | 29,904 | 35,996 | 41,242 | 978 | 74.2 | 80.8 | 67.6 | 67.5 | 32.5 |
| Mru | 1,477 | 836 | 1,231 | 1,546 | 271 | 197 | 1,074 | 61.7 | 70.2 | 53 | 62.5 | 37.5 |
| Munda | 160,245 | 198,701 | 230,016 | 289,091 | 341,542 | 366,386 | 990 | 57.7 | 67.1 | 48.3 | 62.8 | 37.2 |
| Nagesia | 4,875 | 2,516 | 42,521 | 10,069 | 8,373 | 16,378 | 987 | 61.8 | 70.1 | 53.5 | 72.8 | 27.2 |
| Oraon | 297,394 | 291,173 | 437,574 | 536,919 | 617,138 | 643,510 | 993 | 59 | 68.1 | 49.9 | 69.2 | 30.8 |
| Pahariya | 487 | 108 | 3,745 | 7,889 | 688 | 921 | 1,042 | 38.2 | 42.3 | 34.1 | 70.2 | 29.8 |
| Rabha | 6,053 | 2,466 | 11,256 | 15,204 | 15,014 | 27,820 | 952 | 61.3 | 68.4 | 53.8 | 65.7 | 34.3 |
| Santal | 1,200,091 | 1,376,980 | 1,666,610 | 1,997,222 | 2,280,540 | 2,512,331 | 1,012 | 54.7 | 66.1 | 43.5 | 53.5 | 46.5 |
| Sauria Paharia | 28 | 158 | 4,253 | 4,590 | 2,332 | 3,480 | 1,029 | 44 | 49.2 | 38.9 | 78.1 | 21.9 |
| Savar | 2,181 | 4,986 | 37,247 | 46,216 | 43,599 | 40,374 | 1,012 | 40.6 | 49.9 | 31.5 | 45.6 | 54.4 |
| Limbu (Subba) | —N/a | —N/a | —N/a | —N/a | —N/a | 46,847 | 1,011 | 81.2 | 87.8 | 74.7 | 64.6 | 35.4 |
| Tamang | —N/a | —N/a | —N/a | —N/a | —N/a | 146,203 | 1,014 | 80.4 | 87.7 | 73.3 | 72.5 | 27.5 |
| Total Scheduled Tribe | 2,054,081 (Note: Including ambiguous generic Scheduled Tribes entry.) | 2,532,969 | 3,070,668 | 3,808,760 | 4,406,794 | 5,296,953 | 999 | 57.9 | 68.2 | 47.7 | 57.9 | 42.1 |

== See also ==
- Scheduled Castes and Scheduled Tribes
