= Tribal religions in India =

Scheduled Tribes distribution map in India by state and union territory according to the 2011 Census.

Roughly 8.6 percent of India's population is made up of "Scheduled Tribes" (STs), traditional tribal communities. In India, those who are not Christians, Muslims, Jews or Zoroastrians are identified as Hindus—the reason being that varied beliefs and practices are allowed in Hinduism, and it is accorded as a geographical identity rather than merely a religious one. Although many of the Scheduled Tribes have modes of worship not typical to mainstream Hinduism, they ontologically form a part of the cultural practices of the land, as nature or ancestral worship, with varying degrees of syncretism.

According to the 2011 census of India, about 7.9 million (7,937,734) out of 1.21 billion people did not adhere to any of the subcontinent's main religious communities of Hinduism, Islam, Christianity, Sikhism, Buddhism, or Jainism. The census listed atheists, Zoroastrians, Jews, and various specified and unspecified tribal religions separately under the header "Other Religions and Persuasions".

Of these religious census groupings, the most numerous are Sarna (4.9 million respondents), Gondi (1 million), Sari Dharam (506,000), Donyi-Poloism (331,000); Sanamahi (222,000) and Khasi (139,000), with all other religions numbering less than 100,000 respondents, including 18,000 for "tribal religion", 5,600 for "nature religion", and 4,100 "animists". The Scheduled Tribes account 89.39% (7,095,408) of total ORP in India.

== Demographics ==
Historical population
Year	Pop.	±%
1871	5,102,823	—
1881	6,426,511	+25.9%
1891	9,280,466	+44.4%
1901	8,584,148	−7.5%
1911	10,295,168	+19.9%
1921	9,774,611	−5.1%
1931	8,280,347	−15.3%
1941	25,441,497	+207.3%
1951	4,985,645	−80.4%
Note: Colonial census data contain discrepancies due to changing political boundaries, unrecorded areas, varied methodologies, and administrative priorities of the era, wherein the religious beliefs of diverse tribal groups were clubbed under single general category, such as Animist or Tribal religion. The post-independence census publishes returns for each religious belief separately. Source: Census of India

State/UT wise distribution of 7.9 million ORP of India, 2011 census
1. Jharkhand (53.4%)
2. West Bengal (11.9%)
3. Madhya Pradesh (7.55%)
4. Chhattisgarh (6.23%)
5. Odisha (6.03%)
6. Arunachal Pradesh (4.57%)
7. Meghalaya (3.25%)
8. Manipur (2.95%)
9. Maharashtra (2.25%)
10. Other (1.94%)

Statistics for the other religions and persuasions, 2011 census
Religious belief	Population	State/UT (significant five)	ST Adherent (%)	Primary ST Adherents (significant five)
Sarna	4,957,467	99.98% in: Jharkhand, Odisha, West Bengal, Bihar, Chhattisgarh	92.61	Santal, Oraon, Ho, Munda, Lohar
Gond/ Gondi	1,026,344	99.97% in: Madhya Pradesh, Chhattisgarh, Maharashtra, Uttar Pradesh, Jharkhand	98.45	Gond, Pardhan, Baiga, Agaria, Generic tribe
Sari Dharma	506,369	100% in: West Bengal	97.42	Santal, Kora, Bhumij, Mahli, Generic tribe
Doni Polo/ Sidonyi Polo	331,370	99.96% in: Arunachal Pradesh, Assam	98.79	Nyishi, Galong, Adi, Tagin, Apatan
Sanamahi	222,422	99.95% in: Manipur	0.32	Kabui, Maring, Generic tribe
Khasi	138,512	99.98% in: Meghalaya	98.23	Khasi, Mikir, Dimasa, Generic tribe
Adivasi	86,877	96.32% in: Jharkhand, Maharashtra, Chhattisgarh, Madhya Pradesh, Gujarat	94.94	Oraon, Gond, Halba, Kharwar, Bhil
Niamtre	84,276	99.98% in: Meghalaya	96.05	Khasi, Synteng, Pawi, Generic tribe
Adi Dharam	82,255	100% in: Odisha, Chhattisgarh, West Bengal	97.46	Oraon, Nagesia, Korwa, Gond, Munda
Adim dhamm	57,022	99.98% in: Chhattisgarh	97.48	Gond, Halba
Atheist	33,304	82.15% in: Maharashtra, Meghalaya, Kerala, Uttar Pradesh, Tamil Nadu	46.43	Khasi, Bhil, Garo
Bidin	29,553	98.76% in: Jharkhand	98.89	Santal, Sauria Paharia, Mal Paharia, Generic tribes
Adi	24,381	98.73% in: Jharkhand, Odisha, Chhattisgarh	96.25	Oraon, Kolha, Nagesia, Gond, Kisan
Songsarek	19,834	99.84% in: Meghalaya	97.13	Garo, Generic tribe
Yumasam	19,093	99.86% in: Sikkim, West Bengal	92.68	Limboo, Limbu (Subba), Generic tribe
Tribal religion	17,393	96.84% in: Arunachal Pradesh, Karnataka, West Bengal, Maharashtra, Andhra Pradesh	83.52	Mishmi, Nocte, Kaman/Miju Mishmi, Miji
Rangfra	10,598	100% in: Arunachal Pradesh	96.46	Tangsa, Longchang Tangsa, Naga, Moglum Tangsa, Taisen Tangsa
Heraka	9,956*	99.95% in: Manipur, Nagaland, Assam	122.2	
Santal	6,485	99.11% in: West Bengal, Jharkhand, Odisha, Bihar	84.19	Santal, Generic tribe
Nature Religion	5,635	98.49% in: Odisha, Madhya Pradesh, Chhattisgarh, Jharkhand	92.28	Khond, Gond, Mal Paharia, Korwa, Baiga
Baháʼí Faith	4,572	58.81% in: Tripura, Uttar Pradesh, Gujarat, Odisha, West Bengal	11.81	Kunbi, Kokna
Nani Intiya	4,528	100% in: Arunachal Pradesh	98.9	Mishmi
Animist	4,130	98.26% in: Sikkim, West Bengal, Nagaland	11.07	Naga
Dupub	3,326	99.97% in: Odisha, Jharkhand	97.9	Ho, Kol, Kolha
Birsa	2,395	99.87% in: Jharkhand	97.66	Munda
Fralung	2,381	100% in: Assam	4.07	Generic tribe
Pagan	2,088*	99.95% in: Meghalaya, Manipur, Nagaland	106.37	Garo, Poumai Naga, Naga
Baiga	1,884	99.79% in: Madhya Pradesh, Chhattisgarh	96.92	Baiga
Tadvi	1,786	99.1% in: Maharashtra	96.64	Bhil, Dhanka
Nocte	1,511	99.47% in: Arunachal Pradesh	97.49	Nocte
Sarnam	1,494	99.8% in: Jharkhand, Odisha	93.04	Bhumij
Ho	1,418	95.77% in: Jharkhand, Odisha	84.41	Ho
Nyarino	1,365	100% in: Arunachal Pradesh	96.92	Aka
Budhadeo	1,345	99.18% in: Chhattisgarh, Maharashtra, Madhya Pradesh	67.88	Gond
Bhil	1,323	98.34% in: Maharashtra, Madhya Pradesh, Gujarat, Rajasthan	67.57	Bhil
A.C.	1,317	94.76% in: Maharashtra, Gujarat, Tamil Nadu	67.81	Bhil
Traditional religion	1,239	98.87% in: Meghalaya, Arunachal Pradesh	95.8	Mikir
Intaya	1,208	99.92% in: Arunachal Pradesh	99.34	Mishmi
Tana Bhagat	1,108	99.91% in: Jharkhand	96.39	Oraon
Oraon	1,091	82.68% in: Jharkhand, West Bengal	82.13	Oraon, Generic tribe
Munda	1,086	96.32% in: Jharkhand, West Bengal, Odisha	87.02	Munda

== Customs ==
The tribal people observe their festivals, which have no direct conflict with any religion, and they conduct marriage among them according to their tribal custom. They have their own way of life to maintain all privileges in matters connected with marriage and succession, according to their customary tribal faith. In keeping with the nature of Indian religion generally, these particular religions often involve traditions of ancestor worship or worship of spirits of natural features.

The various tribes can be categorised into different major linguistic groupings, such as Indo-Aryan, Dravidian, Austroasiatic, Tibeto-Burman, and Andamanese.

About 25% of the Munda people and Oraon people, and 60% of the Kharia people of Jharkhand (population about 130,000), are Christian. Altogether, 43% of Kharia population is Hindu while 46% is Christian. However, almost two-thirds (63%) of the Santhal, over 40% of Munda and Ho tribal population are Hindus. Tribal groups in the Himalayas were similarly affected by both Hinduism and Buddhism in the late 20th century. The small hunting-and-gathering groups in the union territory of the Andaman and Nicobar Islands have been under severe pressure of cultural assimilation.

== Recognition ==
According to the Indian legal system, all the native or indigenous religions of India fall broadly under Hinduism, since the constitution does not classify only Vedic religions as Hinduism as used in the colloquial norm. The term "Hindu" is derived from Persian meaning "Indo" (or Indian), hence the official word "Hinduism" broadly refers to all the native cultures of the Indian subcontinent. The 1955 Hindu Marriage Act "[defines] as Hindus anyone who is not a Christian, Muslim, or Jew".

== List of Tribal Religions in India ==
- Northeast India
  - Donyi-Polo
  - Sanamahi
  - Songsarek
  - Ka Niam Khasi
  - Kundimama
  - Niamtre
  - Rangfrah
  - Heraka
  - Wancho Religion
  - Nocte Religion
  - Tiwa Religion
  - Ahom religion
  - Keoliya
  - Daikhoism
  - Aronban
  - Lokhimon
  - Sat Sang
  - Honghari
  - Cumulang
  - Dyaoism
  - Siangsawn Pasian
  - Krama Religion
  - Sanamahism
  - Sari Dharam
- East India
  - Bon
  - Kiratism
  - Yumaism
  - Sarna
  - Sari Dharam
  - Onge Religion
  - Jarawa Religion
- Central India
  - Koyapunem

== See also ==
- Dravidian folk religion
- Folk Hinduism
- Indian religions
- Kalashism and Kafirism
- Bon
- Freedom of religion in India
- List of ethnic religions
- List of religions and spiritual traditions
