= North Dravidian languages =

Branch of the Dravidian language family

North Dravidian
- Northern Dravidian; Brahui–Kurukh
- Geographic distribution: Baluchistan and Eastern India
- Linguistic classification: Dravidian: North Dravidian
- Proto-language: Proto-Northern Dravidian
- Subdivisions: Brahui; Kurukh–Malto

Language codes
- Glottolog: nort2698

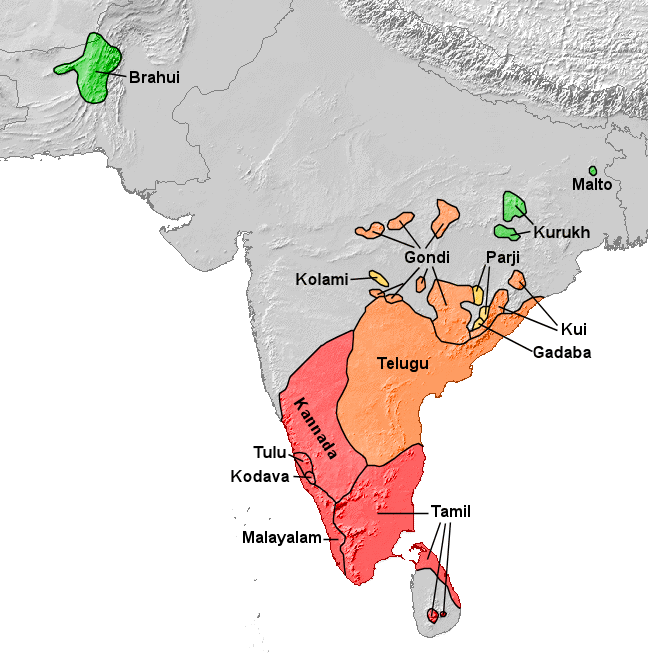
Distribution of the Dravidian languages in South Asia

The North Dravidian languages are a branch of the Dravidian languages that includes Brahui, Kurukh and Malto. (Note: There have been slight differences in the way they are grouped by various Dravidian linguists.)

== Phonological features ==
Northern Dravidian is characterized by the retraction of Proto Dravidian *k to /q/ before vowels other than /i(ː)/ and later spirantizing in Brahui and Kurukh, in return the *c also retracted to /k/ in the same environment.

Initial *w became b likely due to influence from Eastern Indo-Aryan languages. Brahui also has a voiceless lateral which formed after the merge of *ḷ to *l as there are words from both of them but the conditions of the split are not clear.

== Classification ==
The Dravidian languages form a close-knit family. Most scholars agree on four groups, North Dravidian being one of them:

- North Dravidian (Brahui–Kurukh)
  - Kurukh–Malto
    - Kurukh (Oraon, Kisan) 2.28 million (2002–2011)
    - Malto (Kumarbhag Paharia, Sauria Paharia) 159,215 (2011 census)
  - Brahui 2,640,000

The most closely related language to Malto is Kurukh, and the closely connected to Kurukh is Malto; together with Brahui, all three languages form the North Dravidian branch of the Dravidian language family.

== Brahui ==
Brahui: براہوئی (also known as Brahvi or Brohi) is a Dravidian language spoken by the Brahui people who are mainly found in the central Balochistan Province of Pakistan, with smaller communities of speakers scattered in parts of Iranian Baluchestan, Afghanistan, and Turkmenistan (around Merv) and by expatriate Brahui communities in Iraq, Qatar, and the United Arab Emirates.

It is isolated from the nearest Dravidian-speaking neighbouring population of South India by a distance of more than 1,500 kilometres (930 mi). The Kalat, Khuzdar, Mastung, Quetta, Bolan, Nasirabad, Nushki, and Kharan districts of Balochistan Province are predominantly Brahui-speaking.

== Kurukh ==
Kurukh (Kurux, Oraon or Uranw) is a North Dravidian language spoken by the Kurukh (Oraon) and Kisan people of East India. (Note: In some works Kisan is considered an independent language apart from Kurukh.) It is spoken by about two million people in the Indian states of Jharkhand, Chhattisgarh, Odisha, West Bengal, Assam, Bihar and Tripura, as well as about 5,000 in Bhutan. 28,600 speakers of a dialect called Uranw are reported to live in Nepal. In Nepal, the language is called Dhangar or Jhangar, (Note: According to Suren Sapkota, the people call themselves Uranw, while the designation Dhangar/Jhangar is an exonym which they do not like to be called.) being spoken alongside another Dravidian language called Kisan; however, Kisan and Dhangar are treated as Kurukh dialects. Kurux is also spoken by about 65,000 people in northern Bangladesh, in Barind and Sylhet. (Note: Xalxo (2024) cites a Malhar language as part of the North Dravidian group, but it is otherwise generally grouped as within Kurukh.)

== Malto ==
Malto is a North Dravidian language spoken by the Malto or Maler people in Rajmahal Hills of western Jharkhand and eastern Chhattisgarh, but also in West Bengal, Tripura and Orissa. Scholarship identifies three dialects: Kumarbhag, Mal Paharia and Sawriya. (Note: However, scholar B. P. Mahapatra, in his 1979 study, recognizes four groups of Pahariyas, namely, Marpaharia, Kumar Paharia (Kumarbhag), Malpaharia, and Sawriya Paharia. The Marpaharia (with an "r") are an Indo-Aryan speaking group and should not be confused with the Malpaharia (with an "l"), which are the Dravidian-speaking ethnic group.) According to Sanford Steever, Malpaharia and Kumarbhag show "more affinity", while Sawriya is more conservative.

== Bibliography ==
- Zvelebil, Kamil (1990), Dravidian Linguistics: An Introduction, Pondicherry Institute of Linguistics and Culture, ISBN 978-81-8545-201-2.
- Krishnamurti, Bhadriraju (2003). The Dravidian Languages. Cambridge Language Surveys (1 ed.). Cambridge: Cambridge University Press. ISBN 978-0-521-77111-5.
- Sapkota, Suren (2008). "Personal pronouns in Dhangar/Jhangar" (PDF). Nepalese Linguistics. 23: 343–354.
- Sapkota, Suren (2009). "A morphosyntax of relativization in Uranw (Dhangar/Jhangar): a functional typological perspective" (PDF). Nepalese Linguistics. 24: 317–326.
- Rama, Taraka; Kolachina, Sudheer (2013). "Distance-based phylogenetic inference algorithms in the subgrouping of Dravidian languages". In Lars Borin; Anju Saxena (eds.). Approaches to Measuring Linguistic Differences. Berlin, Boston: De Gruyter Mouton. pp. 141–174. doi:10.1515/9783110305258.141.
- Kobayashi, Masato (2017). The Kurux Language: Grammar, Texts and Lexicon. BRILL. ISBN 9789004347663.
- Steever, Sanford B. (2019). "Introduction to the Dravidian languages". In Sanford B. Steever (ed.). The Dravidian Languages (Second ed.). London & New York: Routledge. pp. 1–44.
- Steever, Sanford B. (2019). "Malto". In Sanford B. Steever (ed.). The Dravidian Languages (Second ed.). London & New York: Routledge. pp. 433–468.
- Kobayashi, Masato; Oraon, Tetru (2019). "Kuṛux". In Sanford B. Steever (ed.). The Dravidian Languages (Second ed.). London & New York: Routledge. pp. 469–494.
- Elfenbein, Josef (2019). "Brahui". In Sanford B. Steever (ed.). The Dravidian Languages (Second ed.). London & New York: Routledge. pp. 495–519.
- Kobayashi, Masato (2022). "Proto-Dravidian Origins of the Kuṛux-Malto Past Stems". Bhasha: Journal of South Asian Linguistics, Philology and Grammatical Traditions. 1 (2): 263–282. doi:10.30687/bhasha/2785-5953/2022/01/004.
- Balasubramanian, G.; Arulmozi, S. (2024). "Sociolinguistics of Dravidian Languages in South Asia". In Martin J. Ball; Rajend Mesthrie; Chiara Meluzzi (eds.). The Routledge Handbook of Sociolinguistics Around the World (Second ed.). Routledge. pp. 170–183. doi:10.4324/9781003198345-16.
