= Malto =

Malto may refer to:

- The Malto language, a Dravidian language of India
- The Malto people, an ethnic group of India
- malto-, a prefix referring to maltose
- Malto Brewery, an Albanian company
- Sean Malto (born 1989), American skateboarder
- a member of the Malto family from the kids' sci-fi series Transformers: EarthSpark

== See also ==
- Sauria Paharia (disambiguation), a variant of the Malto language
- Mal Paharia (disambiguation), another language of India also known as Malto
