= Godna =

Indigenous tattoos of India

Godna, also known as Khoda, is an ancient traditional form of tattoo art originating from the tribal communities of Northern and Central India, and present in their diasporas in the Caribbean. These tattoos are characterized by intricate designs and vivid colors, often depicting elements of nature, mythology, and daily life. They are exclusive to women.

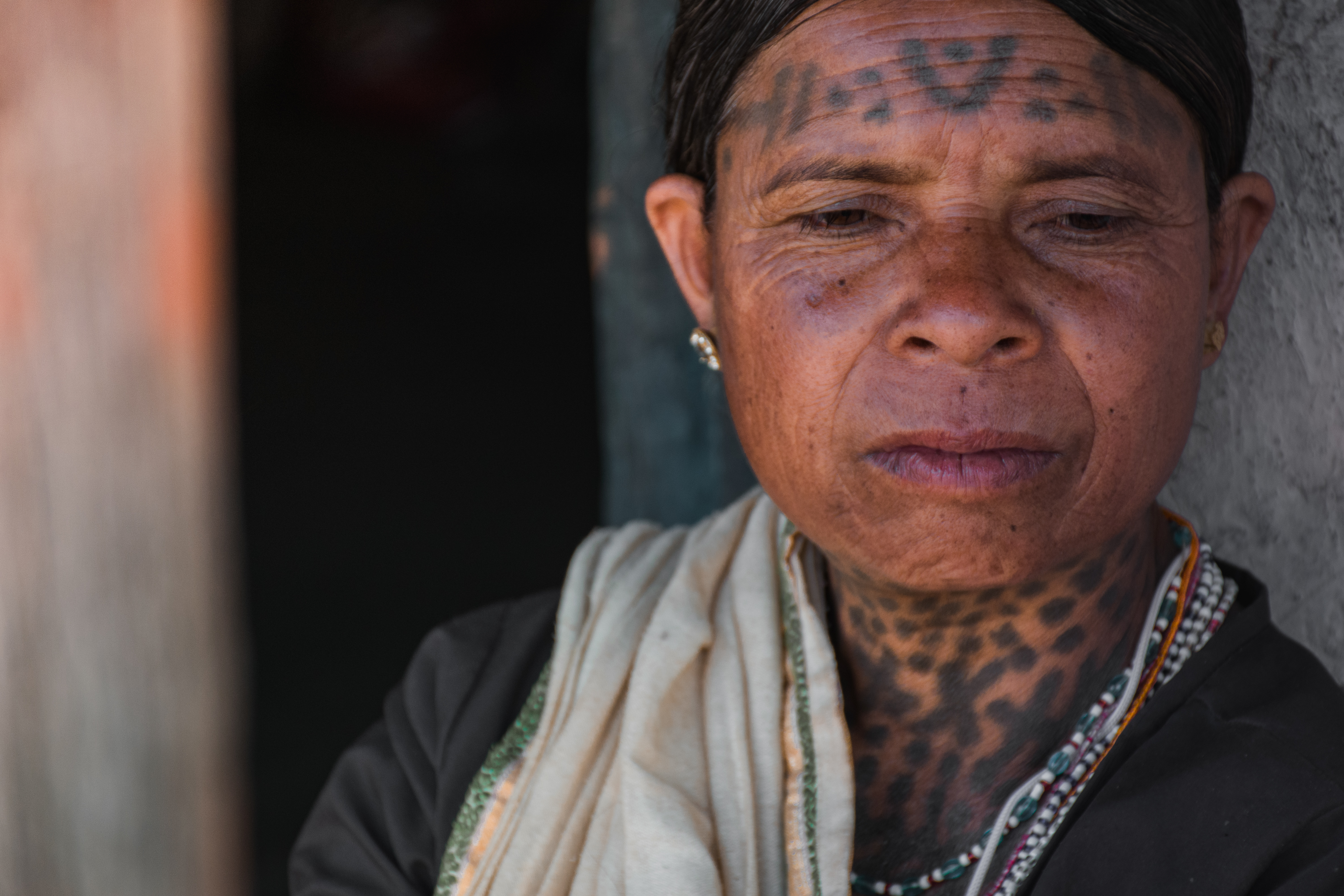
Baiga tribe women in India, known for their art of tattooing or Godna

== History ==
The art of Godna dates back several centuries and has its roots in the cultural practices of tribal communities in India, and a connection to Hinduism. It is traditionally practiced by women and often involves passing down techniques and designs through generations, with style differences between cultural groups. Tattooing is found in many Scheduled Tribe groups like Baigas, Oraons, Birhors, Saharias, Bhunjias, Asurs, Bhumijas, Mal Paharias, Korwas, Mundas, Santals, Konda Reddis, Khondas, Chenchus, Bharias, Kurumbas, Irulas, Bondos, Juangs, Mankidias, Sauras, Lodhas, Mudugars, Paniyans, Kattunayakans, Mannans, Muthuvans, Kanikkarans, Todas, Bhoksas, Rajis, etc.

Since certain diaspora were transported to the Caribbean as indentured servants to work on British and Dutch plantations as coolies, there are people of Indian descent in Guyana and Suriname who carry on the tradition of Godna.

== Significance ==
Bhunjias are noted as believing that their Godna will remain with them spiritually even after they die.

Godna can indicate wealth and social status. In Caribbean communities, Godna was mentioned as needed for marriage, and as symbolizing subjugation of a wife to her husband.

== Modern Day ==
Among Baiga women, popularity of Godna is decreasing, due to the pain of getting it. Godna can also be viewed with prejudice by those who perceive it as primitive or antiquated.

== Gallery ==
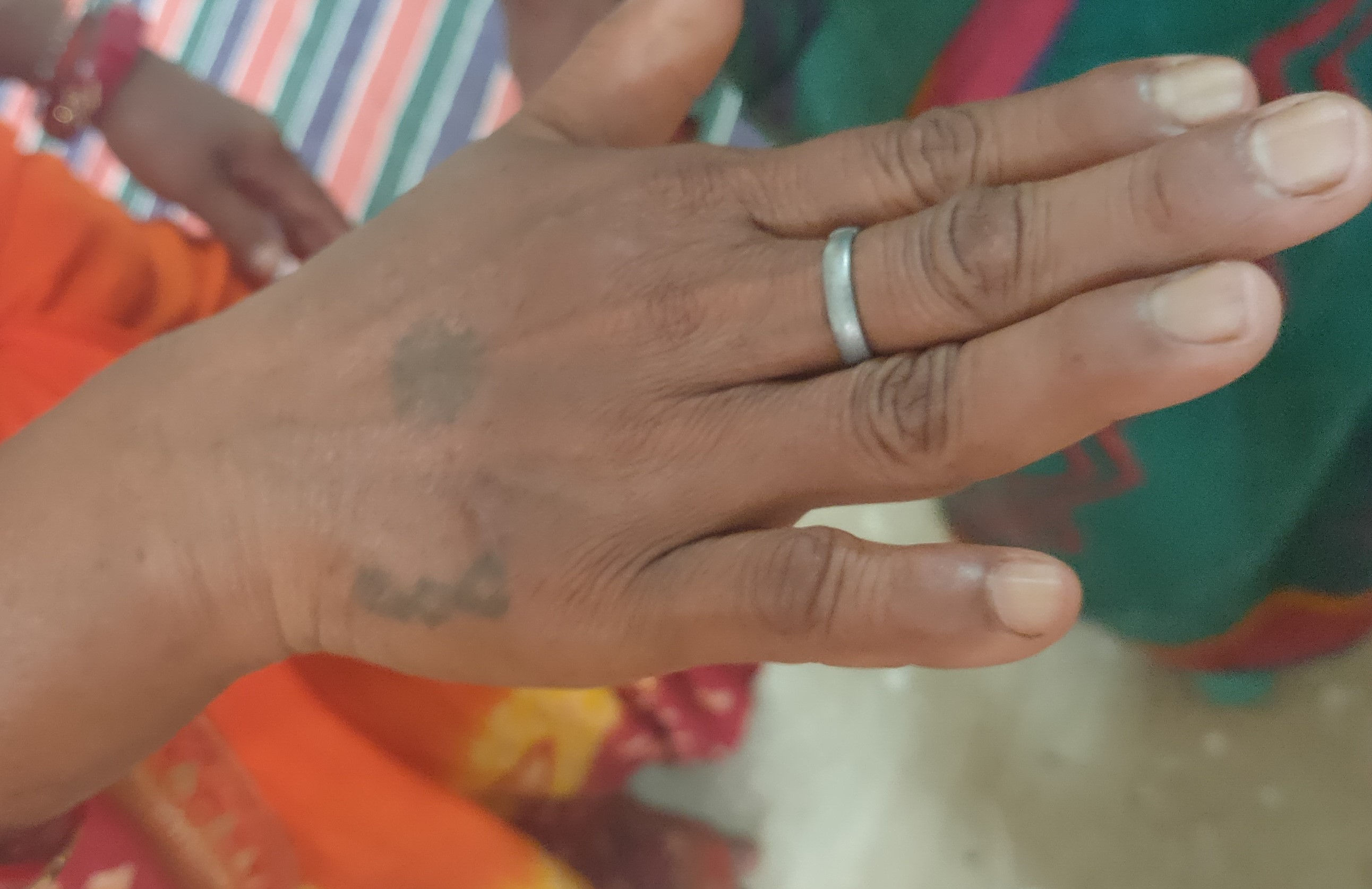

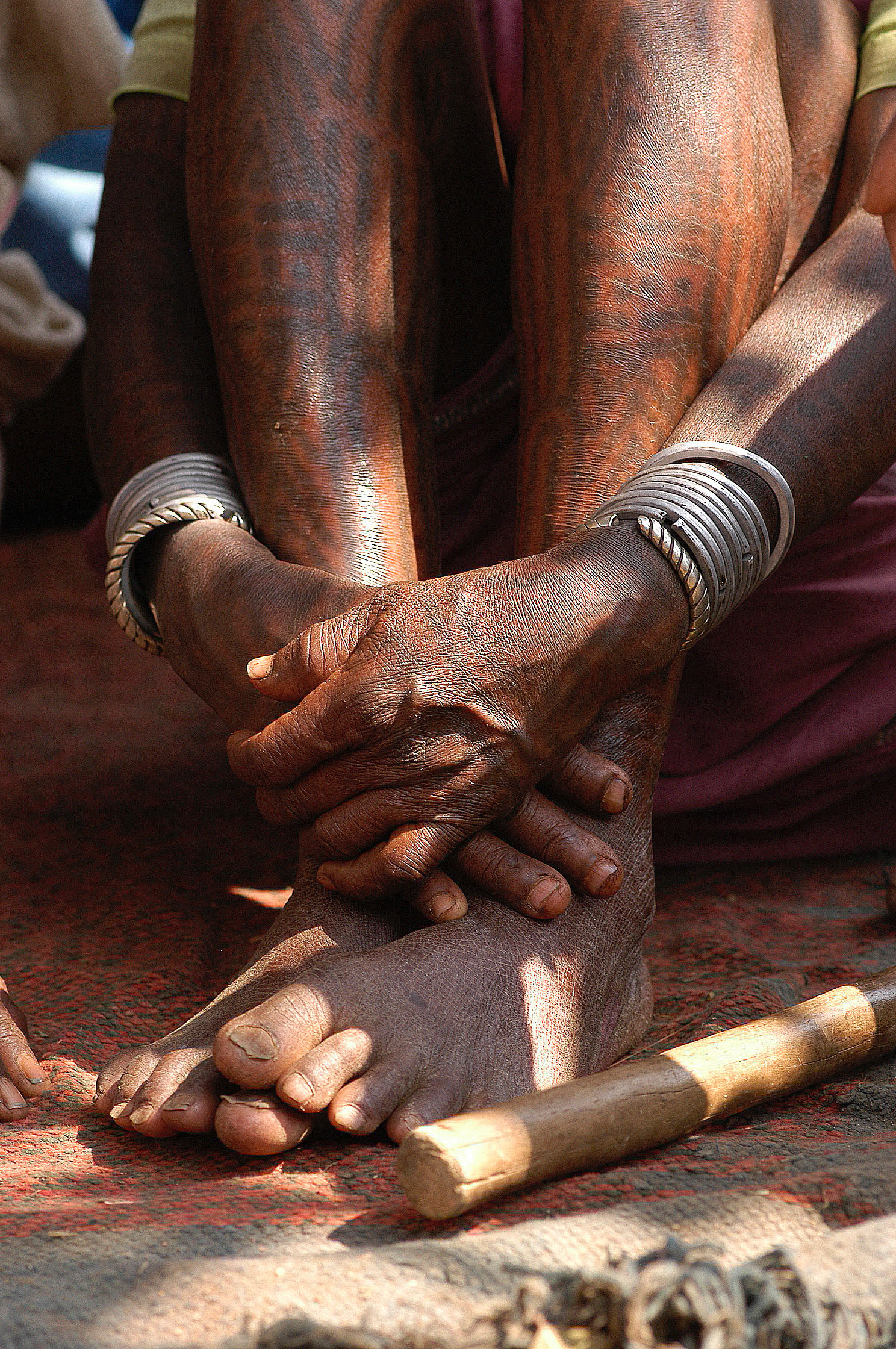

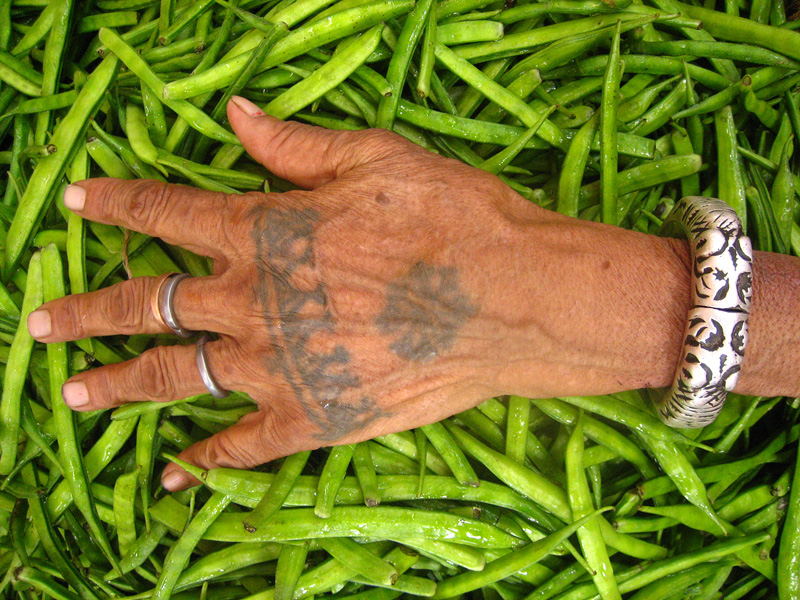

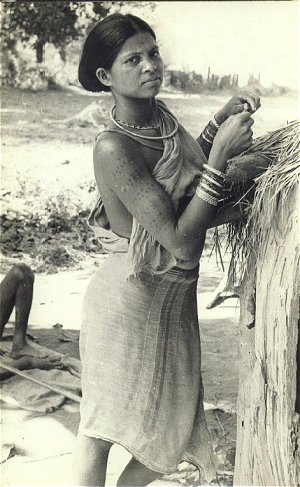

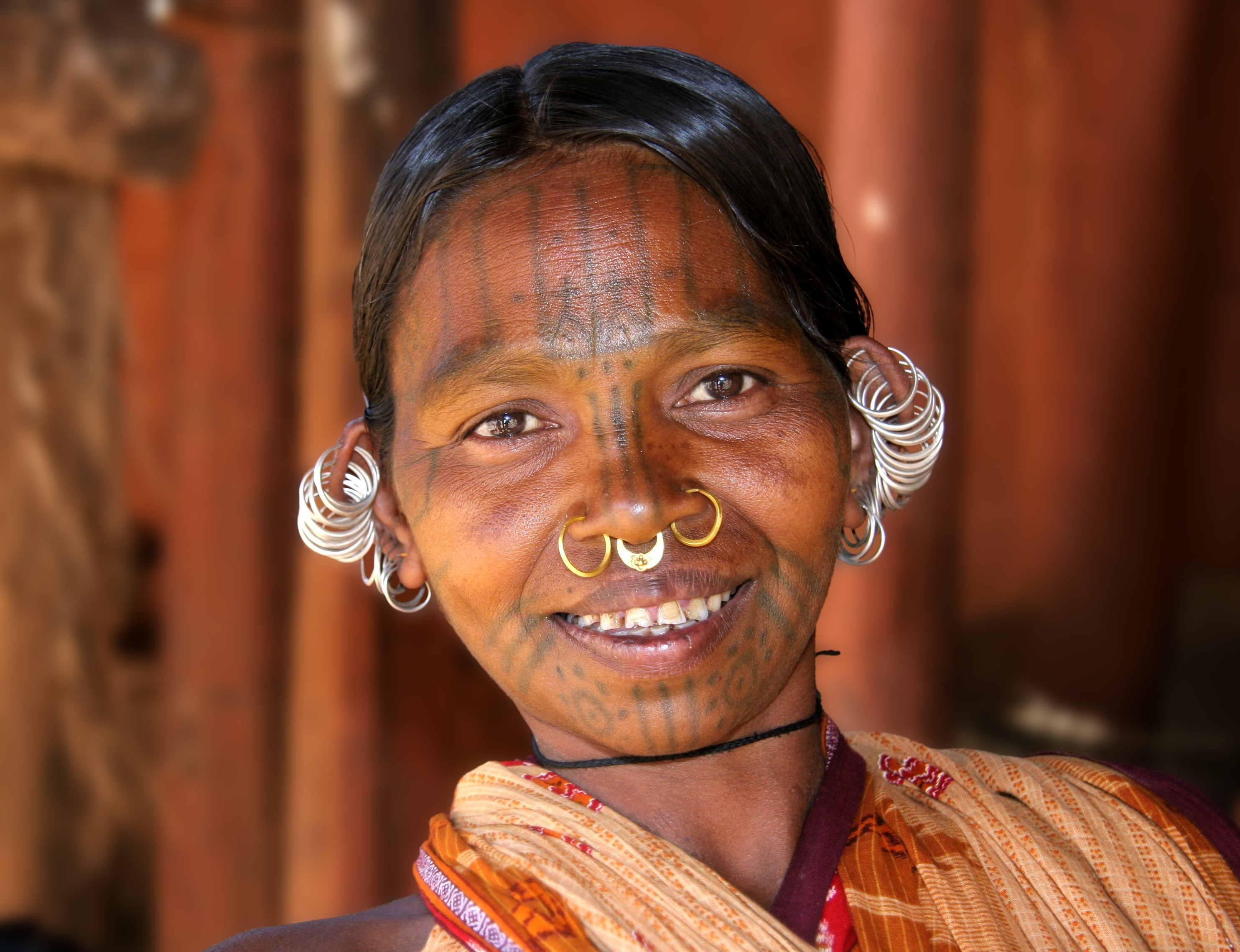

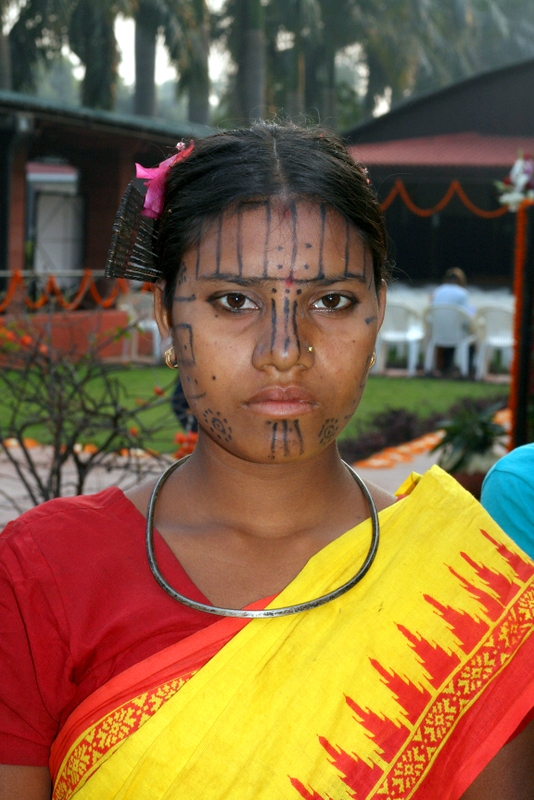

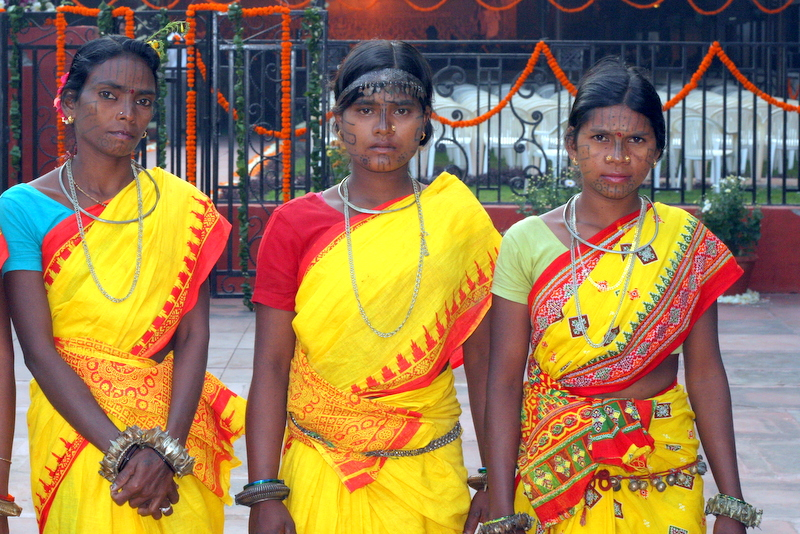

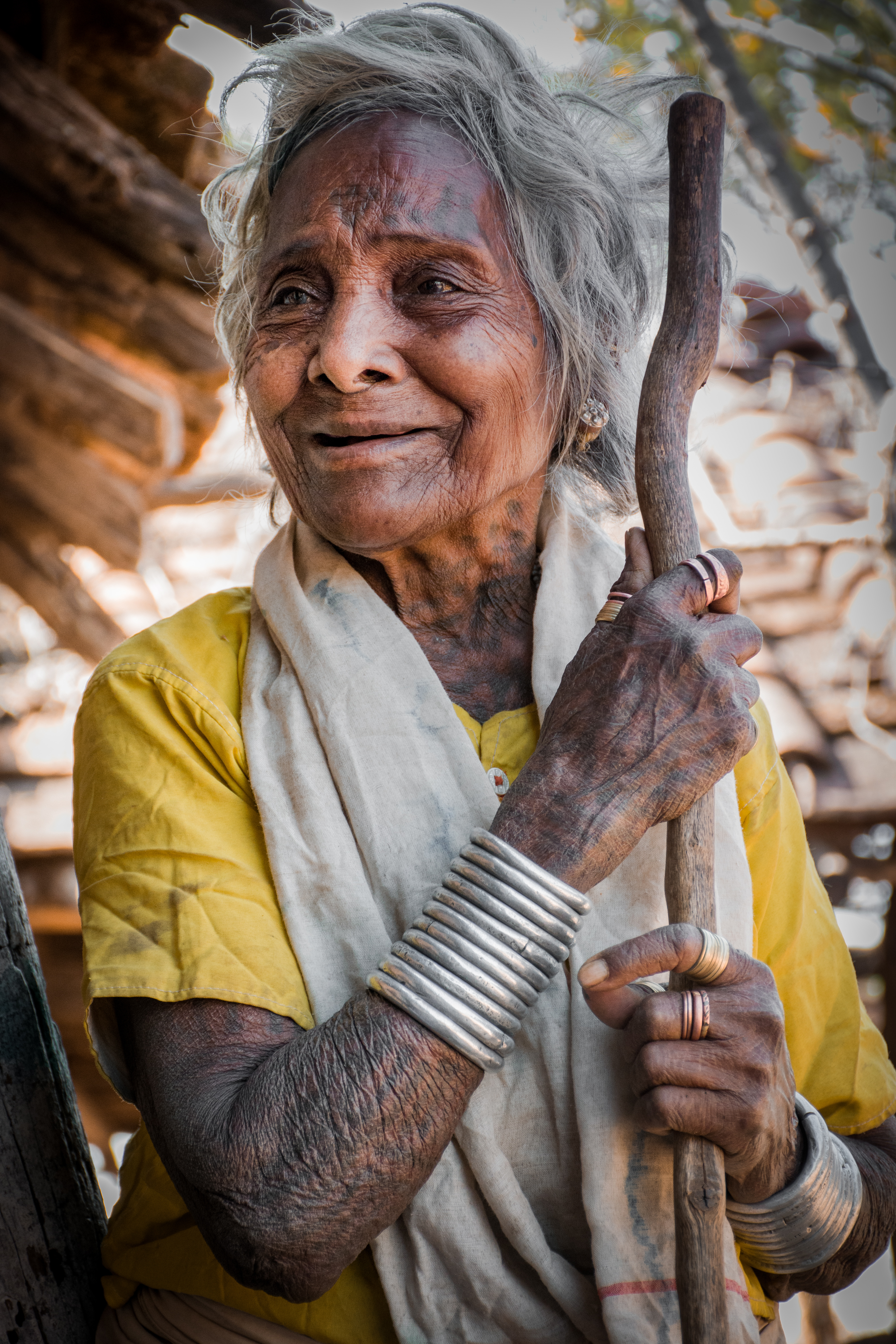

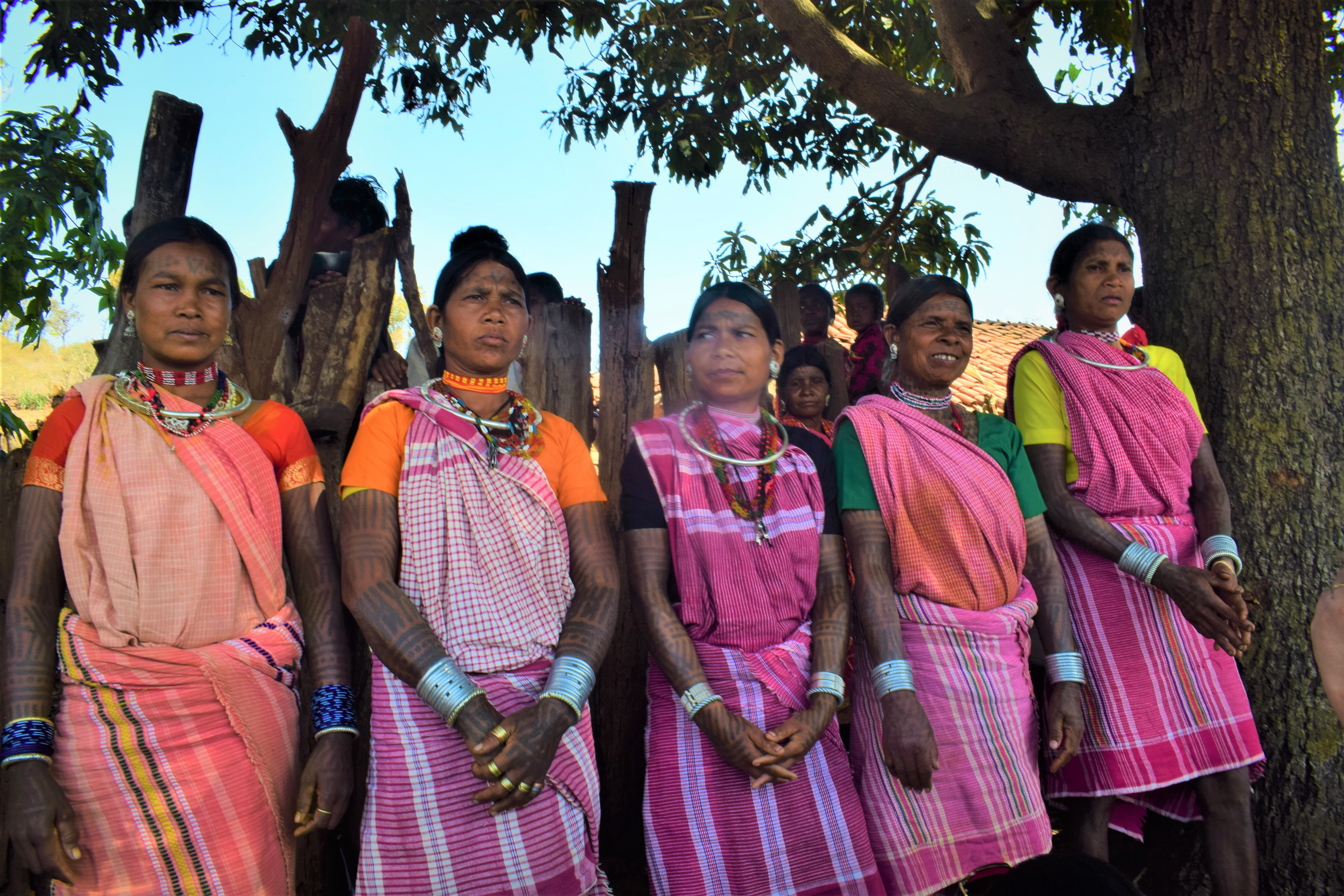

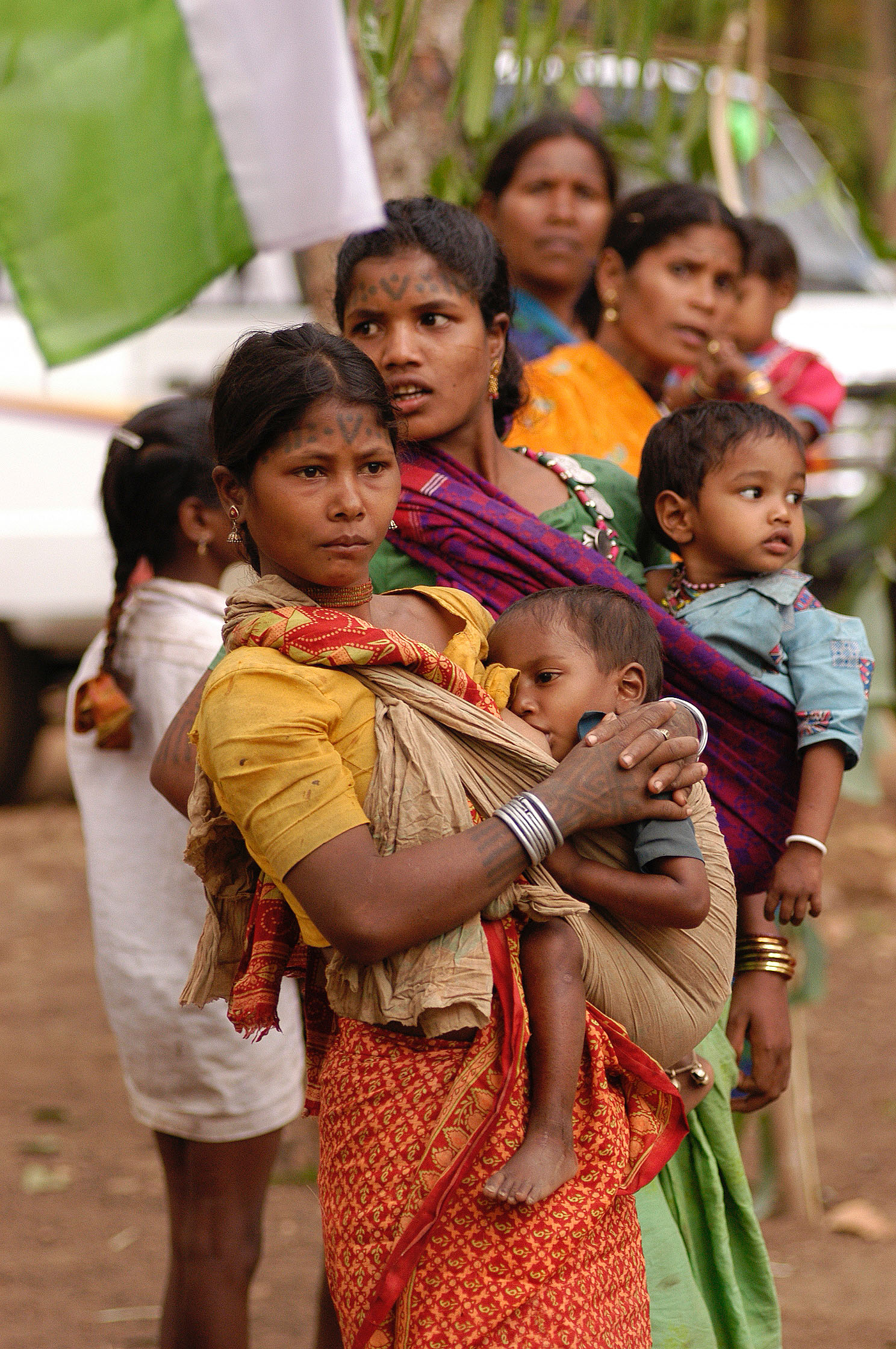

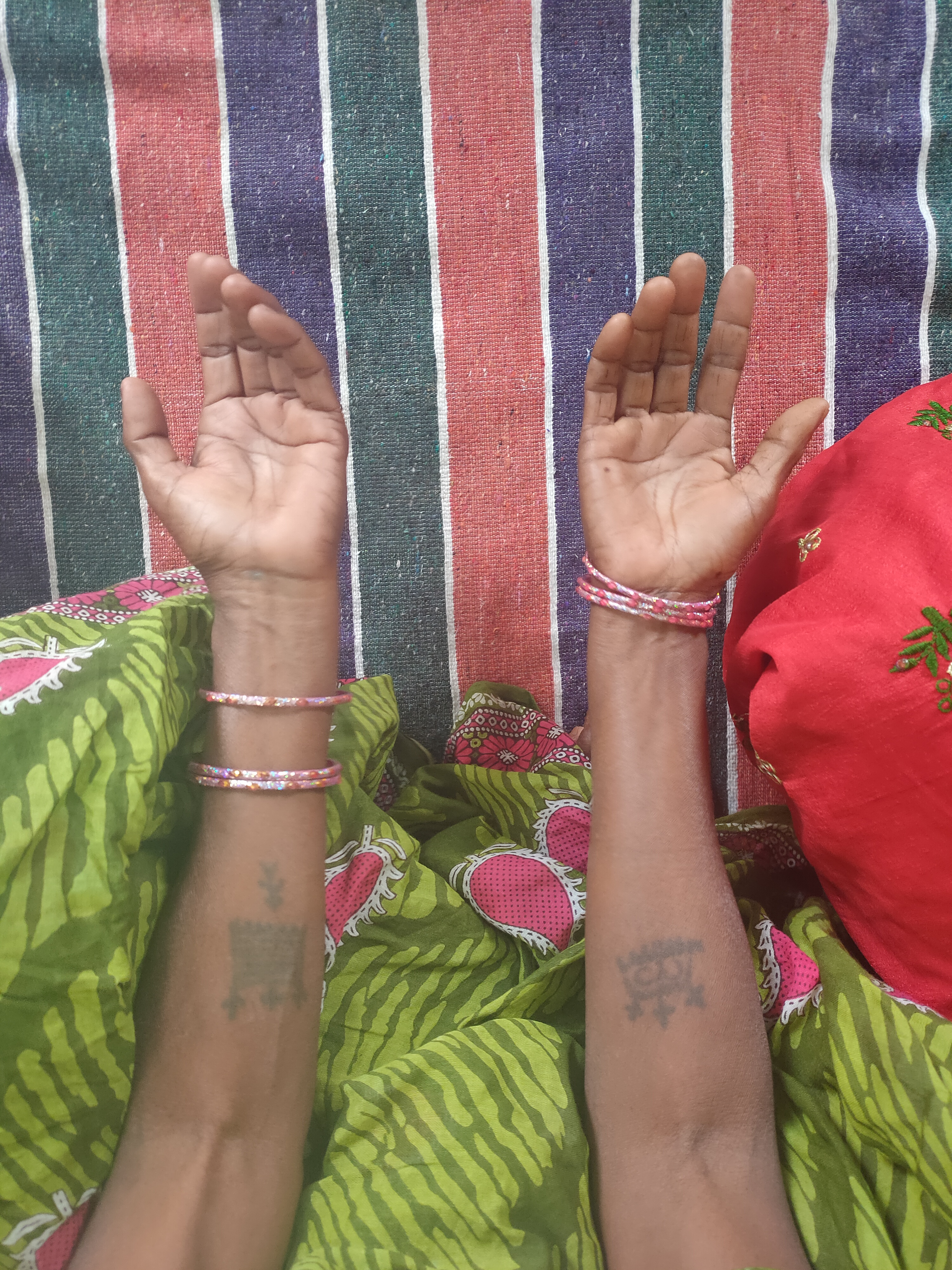
Woman displaying traditional tattoos on her hands. Resident of Naiyyasi village, Bihar, India.
