= Mal Paharia =

Mal Paharia may refer to:

- Mal Paharia people, a tribal people of eastern India
- Mal Paharia language, their Indo-Aryan language, also known as Malto and Parsi

== See also ==
- Paharia (disambiguation)
- Malto (disambiguation)
- Parsi language, alternate name for the language and other languages so known
