= Sauria Paharia =

Sauria Paharia may refer to:

- Sauria Paharia people, a tribal people of Jharkhand in India
- Sauria Paharia language, a variant of the Malto language spoken by the Sauria Paharia people

== See also ==
- Paharia (disambiguation)
- Malto (disambiguation)
