= Malto people =

Malto
Regions with significant populations
- India

Languages
- Malto • Mal Paharia • Regional languages

Religion
- Hinduism

Related ethnic groups
- Kurukh • Kisan • Mal Paharia

Malto is a surname used by some members of the Sauria Paharia community. The Sauria Paharia are a Dravidian indigenous people living mainly in Jharkhand and West Bengal. They speak Malto, related to the nearby Kurukh language, and Mal Paharia, variously classified as an Indo-Aryan language belonging to the Bengali-Assamese branch.

When the British first encountered them they were nomadic. They practised jhum cultivation, as well as hunting and gathering, and would often also raid the plains of Bihar, and would then retreat back into the forest. If there was a crop failure, death or other disaster, they would move to a new spot. Due to the remoteness of their territory they were never conquered by any of the many empires that claimed to rule the region. When the British induced Santals to cultivate the Rajmahal Hills, the Maltos fought back, but were eventually driven out.

Today they still practice jhum cultivation, called kurwa in their language, and collect minor forest produce. They are plagued by many problems, including high levels of poverty and extreme malnutrition. For this reason they are classified as a Particularly Vulnerable Tribal Group. However some are now settled cultivators. They fish in summer, and many now work as daily wage labourers. A few have government jobs.

Among the Sauria Paharia, their traditional marriage ceremony is known as bedi, that takes place in a house. Their society has no restrictions on premarital sexual relations, and children not born out of a marriage can still live with the mother. Another type of common marriage is marriage by capture.

The Malto practice animism and revere a court of spirits known as Gosain. The main Malto god is Dharmer Gosain, a sun god, while their priests are known as demano.

The men wear a small loincloth, known as bhagwan, while the women wear two garments: panchi, an upper garment, usually an unstitched cloth, and pardhan, a cloth around the waist.
