= Particularly vulnerable tribal group =

Administrative grouping of tribes in India

A particularly vulnerable tribal group or PVTG (previously known as a primitive tribal group), in the context of India, is a sub-classification of Scheduled Tribe or section of a Scheduled Tribe, that is considered more vulnerable than a regular Scheduled Tribe. The PVTG list was created by the Indian Government with the purpose of better improving the living standards of endangered tribal groups based on priority. PVTGs reside in 18 states and one union territory.

Classification of tribes in India

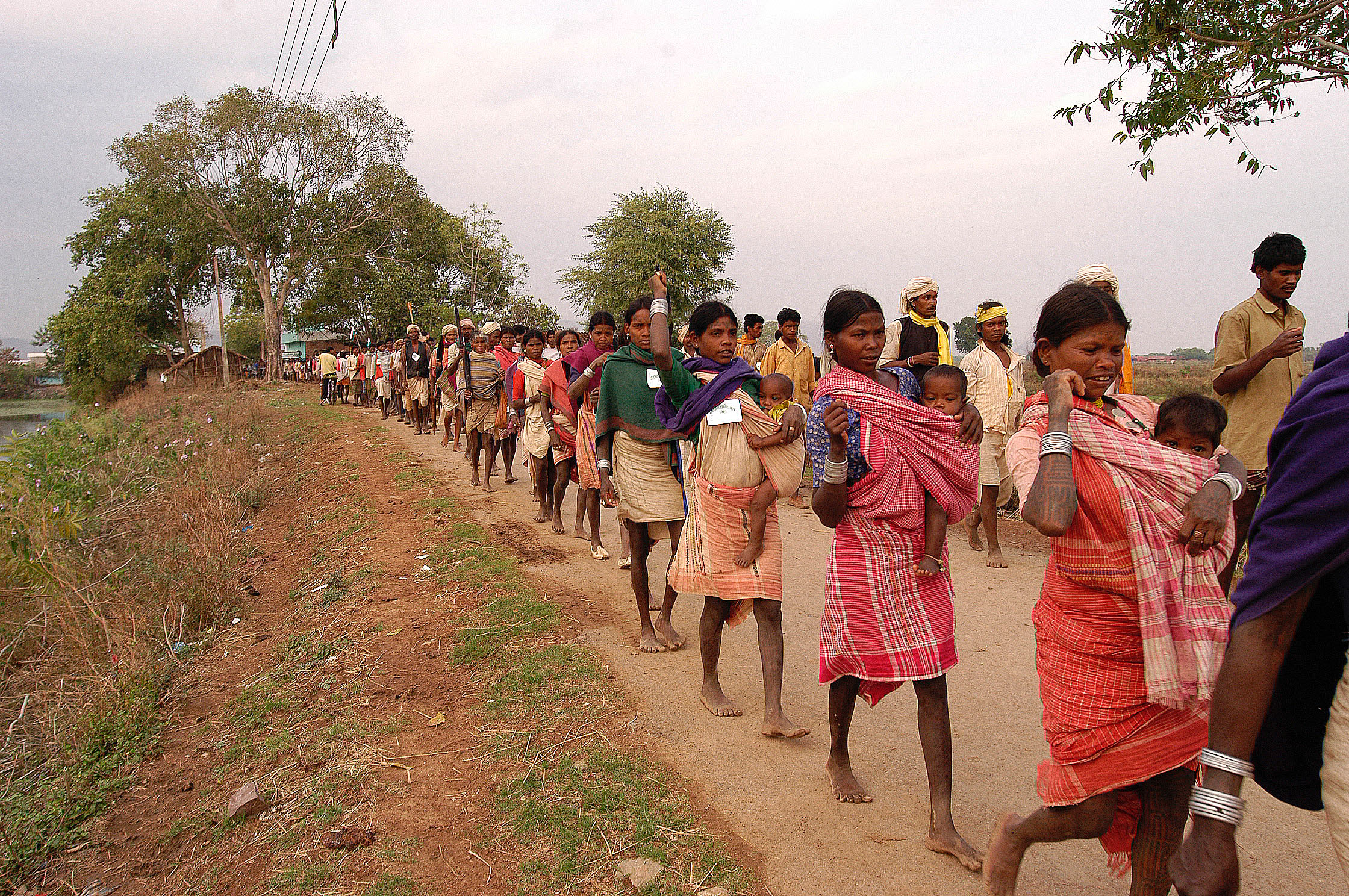
A protest walk by Baigas, the particularly vulnerable tribe of Chhattisgarh.

== Origin of the concept ==
The Dhebar Commission (1960-1961) found that within the Scheduled Tribe classification an inequality existed in the rate of development of certain tribes over others. As a result, in the fourth Five-Year Plan the sub-category "Primitive tribal group" was created within the grouping of Scheduled Tribe to identify groups considered to be especially lacking in modern development. The features of such a group include a pre-agricultural system of existence, that is practice of hunting and gathering, zero or negative population growth, and extremely low levels of literacy in comparison with other tribal groups.

Groups that satisfied any of the criteria were considered to be a Primitive Tribal Group. At the conclusion of the Fifth Five-Year Plan, 52 communities were identified as "primitive tribal group" based on recommendations made by Indian state governments. At the conclusion of the Sixth Five-Year Plan 20 additional groups were added and 2 more were added in the Seventh Five-Year Plan and finally one more group was added in the eighth five-year plan, for a total 75 groups were identified as Primitive Tribal Group. The 75th group recognised as PTG were the Maram in Manipur in 1993–94. No new group was declared as PTG on the basis of the 2001 census.

In 2006 the government of India changed the name of "Primitive tribal group" to "Particularly vulnerable tribal group" PTG has since been renamed Particularly vulnerable tribal group by the government of India.

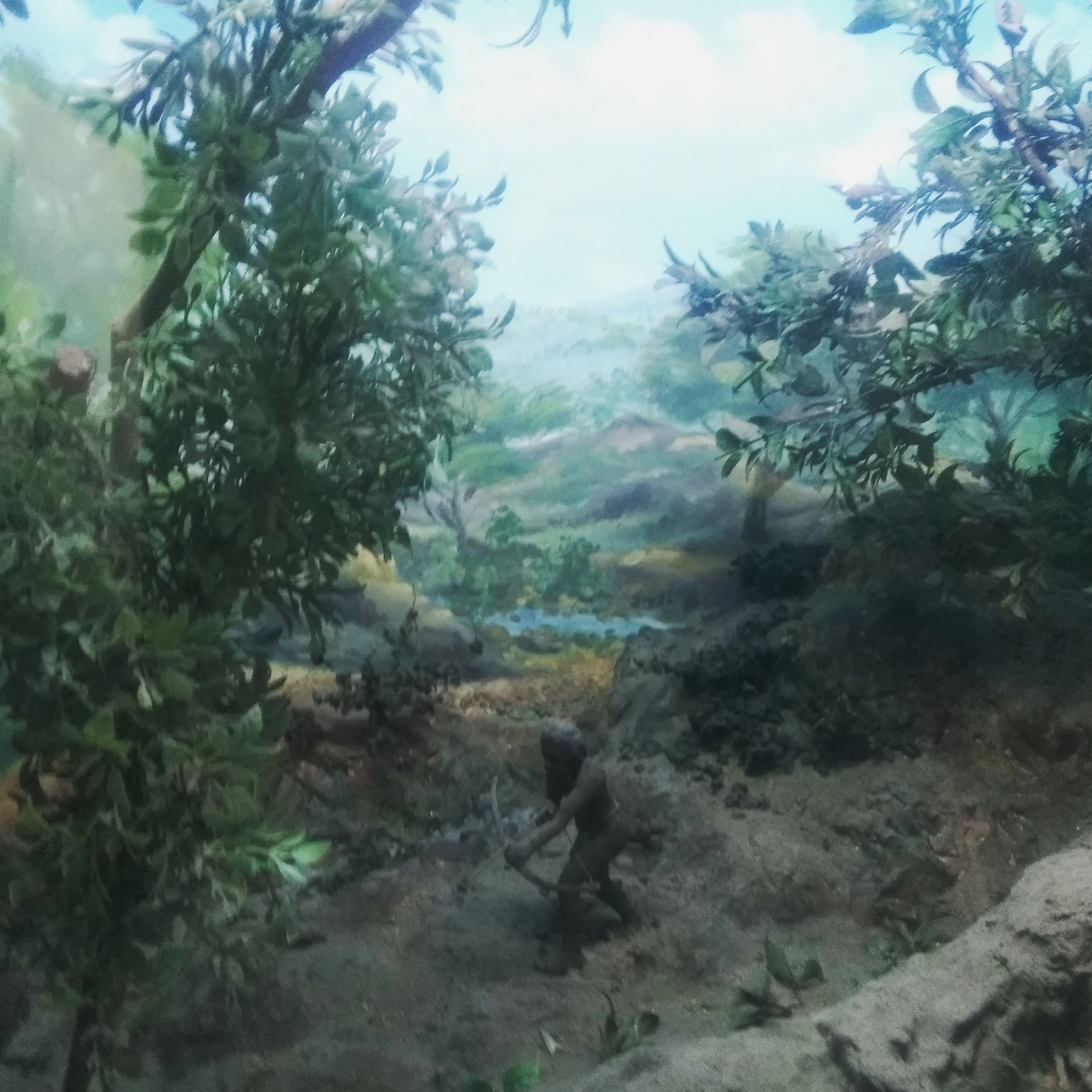
Chenchu people, the PVTG of Andhra Pradesh, hunting.

== Other issues ==
Until 2018 Particularly Vulnerable Tribal Groups were not allowed contraceptive use by the Indian Government because of their often declining or stagnant population growth. Based on the assumption that allowing them to use contraception would hamper efforts to increase the size of their populations. However in 2018 the High Court of Chhattisgarh in a Public Interest Litigation found this to be a violation of their right to privacy and ruled that they had the right to contraceptives. The PVTG of Chhattisgarh got these rights amidst concerns of family planning amongst many of them particularly the Baigas.

== List ==
Sl. No.	Name of PVTG	Notified State	Population (2011)
1	Chenchu	Andhra Pradesh and Telangana	64227
2	Bodo Gadaba	Andhra Pradesh and Telangana	38081
3	Gutob Gadaba	Andhra Pradesh and Telangana	
4	Dongria Khond	Andhra Pradesh and Telangana	103290
5	Kultia Khond	Andhra Pradesh and Telangana	
6	Kolam	Andhra Pradesh and Telangana	44912
7	Konda Reddi	Andhra Pradesh and Telangana	107747
8	Kondasavara	Andhra Pradesh and Telangana	139424
9	Bondo Porja	Andhra Pradesh and Telangana	-
10	Khond Porja	Andhra Pradesh and Telangana	-
11	Parengi Proja	Andhra Pradesh and Telangana	36502
12	Thoti	Andhra Pradesh and Telangana	4811
13	Asur	Bihar Jharkhand	4129
14	Birhor	Bihar Jharkhand	377
15	Birjia	Bihar Jharkhand	208
16	Hill Kharia	Bihar Jharkhand	11569
17	Korwa	Bihar Jharkhand	452
18	Mal Paharia	Bihar Jharkhand	2225
19	Parhaiya	Bihar Jharkhand	647
20	Sauria Paharia	Bihar Jharkhand	1932
21	Savar	Bihar Jharkhand	80
22	Kolgha	Gujarat	67119
23	Kathodi	Gujarat	13632
24	Kotwalia	Gujarat	24249
25	Padhar	Gujarat	30932
26	Siddi	Gujarat	8661
27	Jenu Kuruba	Karnataka	36076
28	Koraga	Karnataka	14794
29	Cholanaikayan	Kerala	124
30	Kadar	Kerala	2949
31	Kattunayakan	Kerala	18199
32	Koraga	Kerala	1582
33	Kurumba	Kerala	2586
34	Abujh Maria	Madhya Pradesh and Chhattisgarh	5093124
35	Baiga	Madhya Pradesh and Chhattisgarh	414526
36	Bharia	Madhya Pradesh and Chhattisgarh	193230
37	Birhor	Madhya Pradesh and Chhattisgarh	52
38	Hill Korwa	Madhya Pradesh and Chhattisgarh	-
39	Kamar	Madhya Pradesh and Chhattisgarh	666
40	Sahariya	Madhya Pradesh and Chhattisgarh	165
41	Katkari/ Kathodi	Madhya Pradesh and Chhattisgarh	285334
42	Kolam	Madhya Pradesh and Chhattisgarh	194671
43	Maria Gond	Madhya Pradesh and Chhattisgarh	1618090
44	Maram Naga	Manipur	27524
45	Chuktia Bhunjia	Odisha	2378
46	Birhor	Odisha	596
47	Bondo	Odisha	12231
48	Didayi	Odisha	8890
49	Dongria Khond	Odisha	6306
50	Juang	Odisha	47095
51	Kharia	Odisha	222844
52	Kutia Khond	Odisha	7232
53	Lanjia Saura	Odisha	5960
54	Lodha	Odisha	9785
55	Mankirdia	Odisha	2222
56	Paudi Bhuya	Odisha	5788
57	Saura	Odisha	534751
58	Saharia	Rajasthan	111377
59	Irular	Tamil Nadu	189661
60	Kattunayakan	Tamil Nadu	46672
61	Kota	Tamil Nadu	308
62	Korumba	Tamil Nadu	6823
63	Paniyan	Tamil Nadu	10134
64	Toda	Tamil Nadu	2002
65	Raing	Tripura	188220
66	Buksa	Uttar Pradesh and Uttrakhand	4710
67	Raji	Uttar Pradesh and Uttrakhand	2241
68	Birhor	West Bengal	2241
69	Lodha	West Bengal	108707
70	Toto	West Bengal	66627
71	Great Andamanese	Andaman & Nicobar Islands	44
72	Jarawa	Andaman & Nicobar Islands	380
73	Onge	Andaman & Nicobar Islands	101
74	Sentinelese	Andaman & Nicobar Islands	15
75	Shompen	Andaman & Nicobar Islands	229
