= Pahari =

Pahari or Pahadi may refer to:

- Pahari language, the name of several languages and dialects of South Asia
- Pahari-Poonchi, a language spoken in Poonch Division, Pakistan and Poonch District, India
- Pahari people (Nepal), an ethnic group of Nepal
- Pahari people, a cover term for many Northern Indo-Aryan speaking groups of Uttarakhand and Himachal Pradesh, India
- Pahari people (Kashmir), a designation for speakers of a Pahari languages in Indian-administered Kashmir
- Pahari people (Bangladesh), a cover term for a number of ethnic groups of eastern Bangladesh
- Pahari culture
- Pahari painting, an art form of the Himalayas
- Pahari, Rajasthan, a village in India
- Pahari (Dungeons & Dragons), a fictional monster in the fantasy games

== See also ==
- Pahari language (disambiguation)
- Paharia (disambiguation)
