= Baiga people =

Ethnic group of India

Baiga
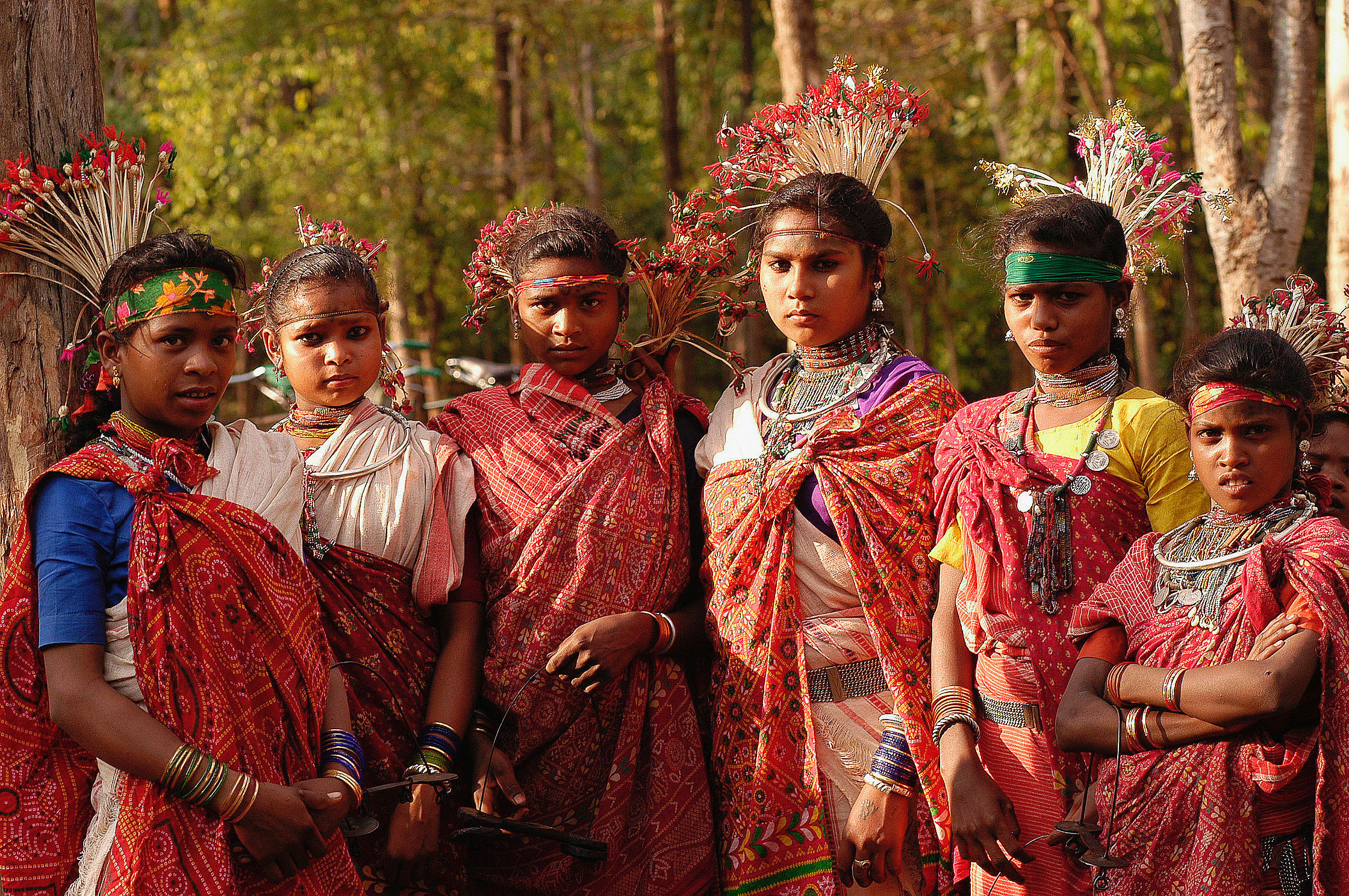
- Baiga women in traditional dress

Total population
- 552,495 (2011, census)

Regions with significant populations
- India
- Madhya Pradesh: 414,526
- Chhattisgarh: 89,744
- Uttar Pradesh: 47,393
- West Bengal: 13,423 (Note: The Baiga population in West Bengal was almost negligible during the colonial era but has experienced substantial growth since independence, especially after removal of area restrictions by the Scheduled Castes and Scheduled Tribes Orders (Amendment) Act, 1976. As census data indicates, there were 4 individuals in 1961, 0 in 1971, 1,606 in 1981, 7,624 in 1991, 11,681 in 2001, and 13,423 in 2011. According to the 1981, 1991, 2001 and 2011 district-specific census breakdown shows that the Baigas are predominantly concentrated in the undivided Paschim Medinipur district, with 987, 6000, 11205 and 12845 individuals respectively. This notable population increase is attributed to members of the Bagal community, who have been identifying themselves as Baiga in order to avail constitutional benefits as a Scheduled Tribe.)
- Jharkhand: 3,583
- Bihar: 544
- Odisha: 338
- Maharashtra: 333

Languages
- Chhattisgarhi • Hindi • Regional languages

Religion
- Hinduism • Islam • Tribal religion

The Baiga are an ethnic group found in central India primarily in the state of Madhya Pradesh, and in smaller numbers in the surrounding states of Uttar Pradesh, Chhattisgarh and Jharkhand. The largest number of Baiga is found in Baiga-chuk in Mandla district and Balaghat district of Madhya Pradesh. They have sub-castes: Bijhwar, Narotia, Bharotiya, Nahar, Rai maina and Kath maina. The name Baiga means "sorcerer-medicine man".

== Demographics ==
Distribution of Baiga tribe in India

The Baiga tribe is officially recognized among Scheduled Tribes in eight states: Madhya Pradesh (414,526), Chhattisgarh (89,744), Uttar Pradesh (30,006), West Bengal (13,423), Jharkhand (3,583), Bihar (544), Odisha (338), and Maharashtra (333). In Uttar Pradesh, the Baiga population totals 47,393. Among them, the Baigas of Sonbhadra district are recognized as a Scheduled Tribe, numbering 30,006, while in other districts of Uttar Pradesh, they are categorized as Scheduled Caste, with a population of 17,387.

== Livelihood ==
The Baiga do not plow the land, because they say it would be a sin to scratch the breast of their Mother, and they could never ask their Mother to produce food from the same patch of earth time and time again: she would have become weakened. The Baiga tribes practice shifting cultivation, called "bewar" or "dahiya."

Live-in relationships are common among the Baiga. If marriage does take place, the man compensates the woman's family for the loss of a working member. This reverse dowry either involves footing the bill of the marriage celebration or offering the woman's family mahua liquor. If the bride is divorced, the new husband must compensate the old one for the dowry amount. If the divorced couple have children, the wife has the first right to take custody, followed by the husband. If neither wants to raise the child, the community will allot a guardian to the child until age 15.

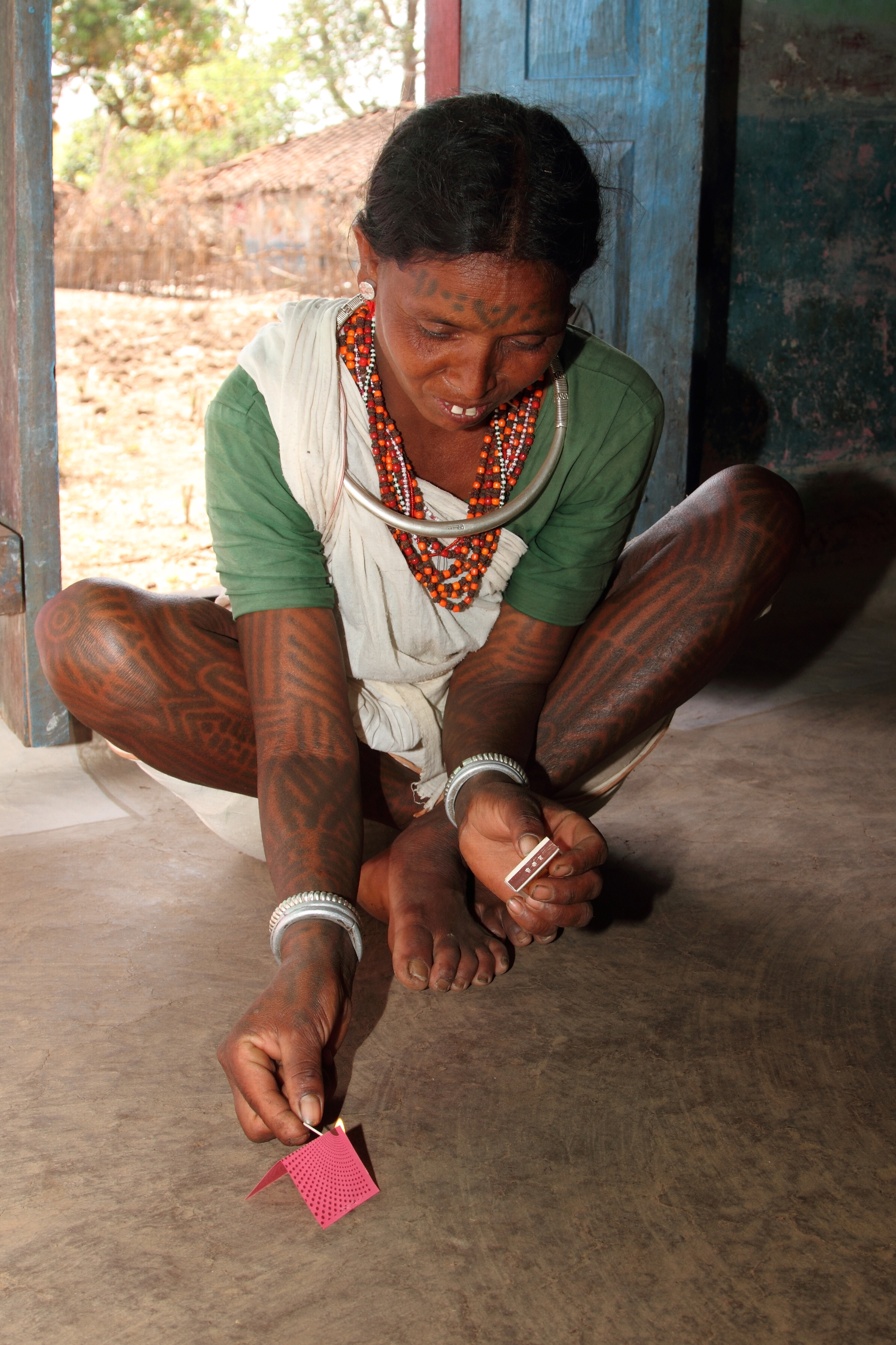
Baiga tribe woman with tattoos

The Baigas in Chhattisgarh are classified as a particularly vulnerable tribal group (PVTG) by the government of India due to their declining population and low level of literacy. The government of India has noted 75 PVTG which reside in 18 states and in one UT, which are classified on the basis of five criteria. In Chhattisgarh, Baigas, Abhujmaria, Kamar, Pahadi Korwa, and Birhor are included in this group. The women of these tribes were previously not provided reproductive rights, but in 2018, a Public Interest Litigation at the Chhattisgarh High Court allowed them to have access to contraceptives. The Baigas were found to be highly focused on family planning.

== Culture ==
=== Language ===
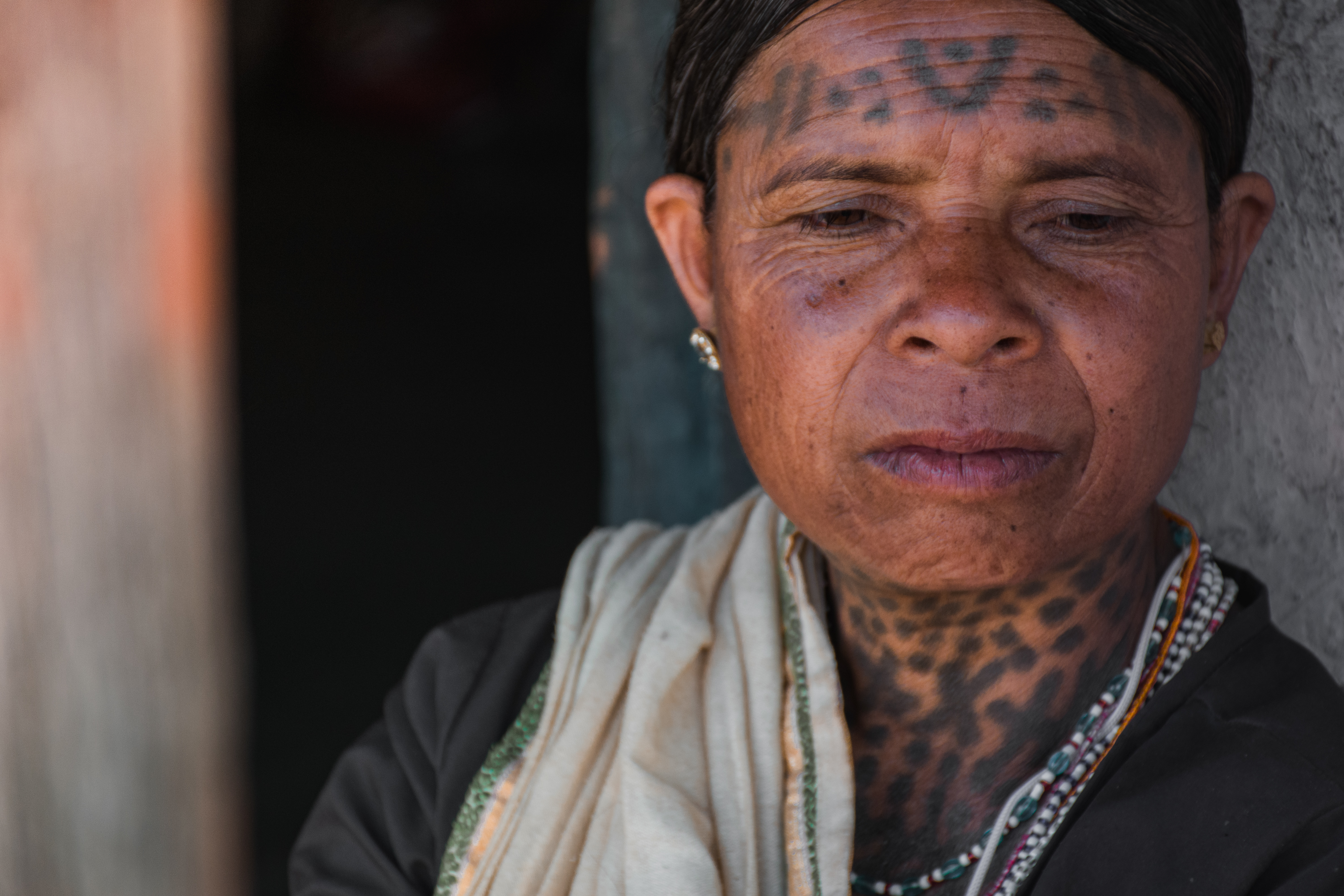
Baiga tribe women in India is known for their art of tattooing or Godna

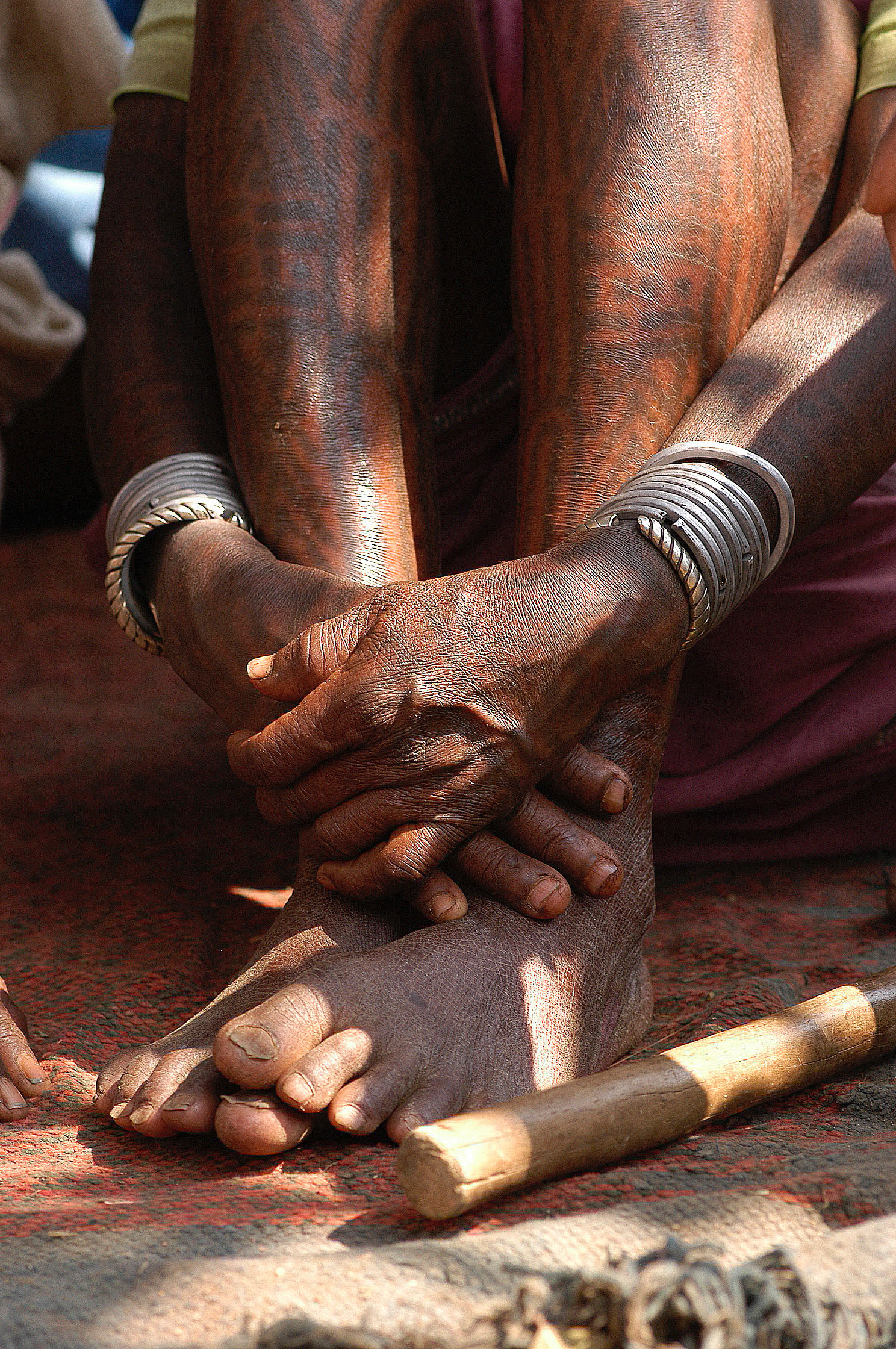
Baiga leg tattoos

It is believed that the ancestors of the Baigas spoke an Austroasiatic language, however no trace of it is left now. Some Baigas (specifically those from the Mandla district) have mentioned "Baigani" as their mother tongue in the past: Baigani is now recognised as a variety of Chhattisgarhi influenced by Gondi. Most Baigas speak Hindi, and some of them also know a few local languages such as Gondi and Marathi depending on the region where they live.

Baiga tribe's Karam dance

=== Cuisine ===
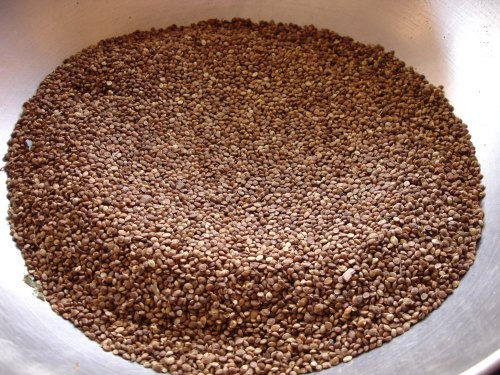
Kodo millet, a primary food of the Baiga

Baiga cuisine primarily consists of coarse grains, such as kodo millet and kutki, and involves very little flour. Another staple food of the baiga is pej, a drink that can be made from ground macca or from the water left from boiling rice. They supplement this diet with food from the forest, including many fruits and vegetables. They hunt, primarily fish and small mammals.

=== Religion and mythology ===
The Baiga believe their mythical ancestors were Nanga Baiga, the male ancestor, and Nanga Baigin, the female ancestor. They were born from the goddess Dharti Mata, and Nanga Baiga had "great" magic power.

They helped Bhagavan create the world and serve as its guardians.

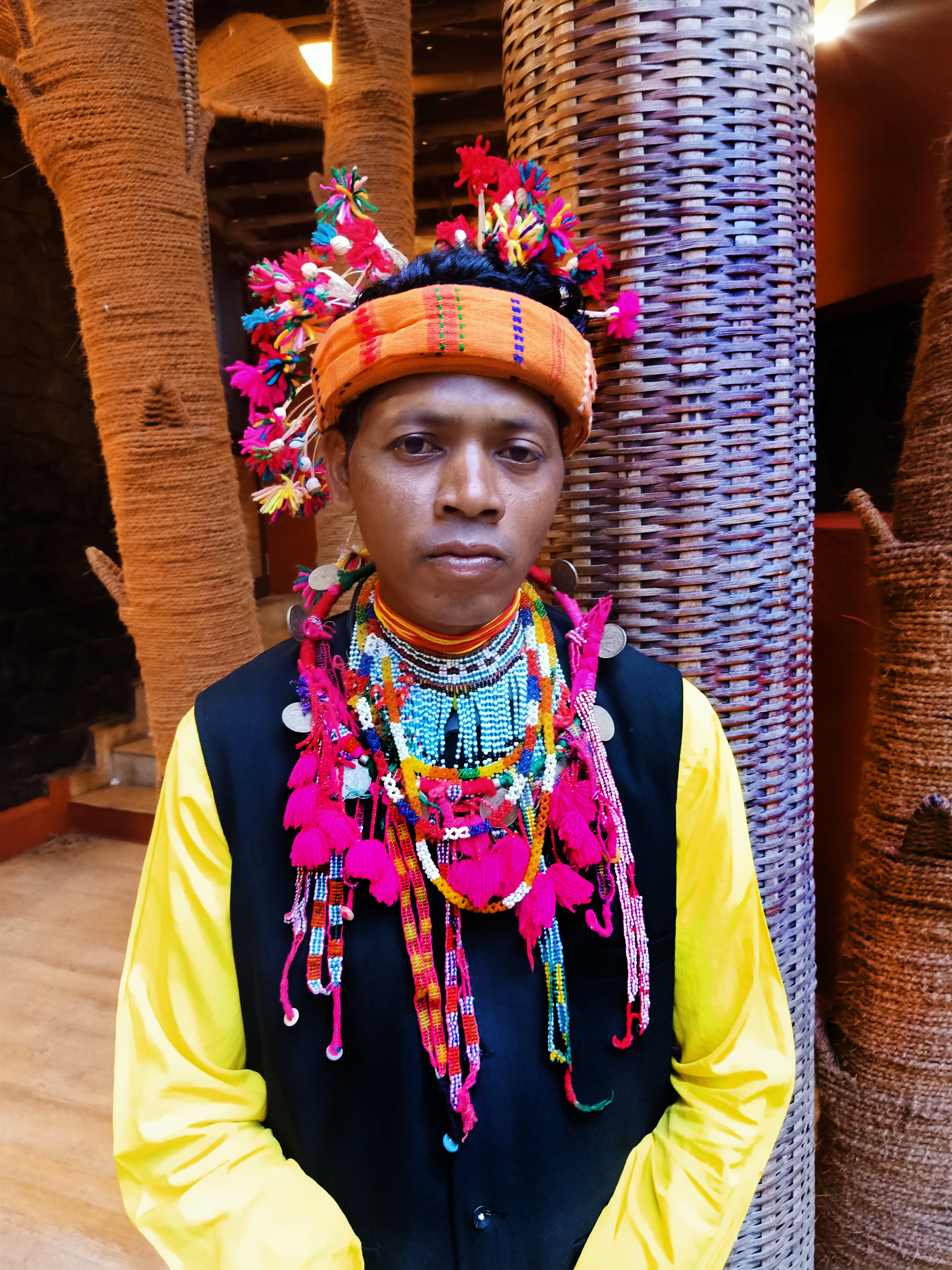
Baiga tribe man in their traditional wear

== Forced evictions ==
Since the 1960s, the Baiga have been the victims of forced evictions at the hands of the Indian authorities. These are often carried out in the name of conservation, in an attempt to protect the tiger populations, but have disastrous consequences for the displaced communities.

== Notable people ==
- Jodhaiya Bai Baiga, tribal artist
