= Jodhaiya Bai Baiga =

Indian artist (1938 – 2024)

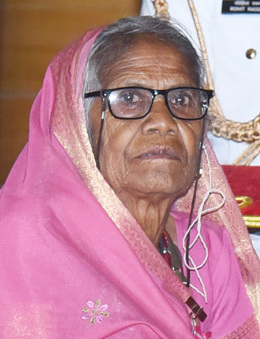
- Baiga in 2023
- Born: 1938
- Died: 15 December 2024 (aged 86); Lorha, Umaria district, Madhya Pradesh, India
- Occupation: Artist
- Known for: Tribal Art/Paintings

Jodhaiya Bai Baiga (1938 – 15 December 2024) was an Indian fine artist. She was Baiga and lived in Lorha village, in Umaria district, Madhya Pradesh. She has two sons and a daughter. She used to earn money by selling compost, firewood, and nuts from the forest.

== Biography ==
When she was in her forties, her husband died and she started to paint. Her artistic style has been compared to that of Jangarh Singh Shyam, who was Gond. After painting on canvas and paper, she also used other media such as clay, metal, and wood; her grandson made masks which she painted. She was inspired by local Baiga motifs such as the mahua tree. Her paintings have been exhibited in Bhopal, Delhi, Milan, and Paris. In 2022, she received the Nari Shakti Puraskar in recognition of her achievements. Subsequently, she was awarded the Padma Shri in Arts by the Government of India in 2023.

Baiga died following a prolonged illness in Lorha, Umaria district, on 15 December 2024, at the age of 86.
