= Paharia =

Paharia may refer to:

- Paharia language (disambiguation)
- Mal Paharia (disambiguation)
- Sauria Paharia (disambiguation)
- Paharia Express, passenger train of the Indian Railways
- Paharia (cicada), a genus of cicadas
