= Mal Paharia language =

Language spoken in India and Bangladesh

Mal Paharia
- माल पहाड़िया, মাল পাহাড়িয়া
- Native to: India
- Region: Jharkhand; West Bengal
- Ethnicity: Mal Paharia
- Native speakers: 50,000 (2006)
- Language family: Indo-European: Indo-Iranian; Indo-Aryan; Eastern; Odia–Bengali–Assamese; Bengali–Assamese; Mal Paharia
- Writing system: Devanagari

Language codes
- ISO 639-3: mkb
- Glottolog: malp1246 Mar Paharia of Dumka
- ELP: Mal Paharia

Mal Paharia is a language variety spoken by 51,000 of 110,000 ethnic Mal Paharia in the states of Jharkhand and West Bengal in India, and regions of Bangladesh. The language is also known as Mal Pahoria, Malto, Malti, Paharia, Parsi, and Mal Pahariya. It has been variously regarded as a Bengali–Assamese language. According to linguists, Mal Paharia is a creole of Bengali and Malto or a transitional variety between Bengali and Bihari languages. There is a generally positive attitude among speakers of the language towards it, but it is considered vulnerable as some speakers have shifted to Bengali.

== History ==
Mal Paharias formerly spoke the Malto language, which later mixed with Bengali and turned into a Bengali-Malto Creole. It is also variously considered a transitional language variety between Bengali and Bihari languages or a variety of Western Bengali spoken by the Mal Pahararia people. The speakers of this language originated in Jharkhand as early as 1881, and since then it has declined in popularity. According to the 1921 census, the town had Indo-European 500 speakers at that time. Industrialization and urbanization were factors in the fragmentation of the Bengali language into dialects because of the making of dams, mines, homes, and more. This caused a displacement in the population of the Indo-European speakers, which led to the emergence of Mal Paharia.

== Mal Paharia phonology ==
The Mal Paharia language uses the Devanagari script for writing and speaking. These tables represent the Devanagari language's phonology.

=== Mal Paharia Devanagari Consonants ===
	Labial	Labio-dental	Labio-Velar	Alveolar	Post-alveolar	Retroflex	Palatal	Velar	Uvular	Glottal
Nasal	m			n̪	n	ɳ	ɲ	ŋ		
Plosive	p pʰ b bʰ			t̪ t̪ʰ d̪ d̪ʰ		ʈ ʈʰ ɖ ɖʰ		k kʰ g gʰ	(q)	
Affricate					ʧ ʧʰ ʤ ʤʰ					
Fricative		f		s z	ʃ ʒ	ʂ		x ɣ		ɦ
Flap				(ɾ)		ɽ				
Trill				(r)						
Approximant			w ~ v	(ɹ)			j			
Lateral Approximant				(l)						

/z/ and /ʤ/ are often used interchangeably and are somewhat allophonic. /v/ and /w/ are true allophones of each other.

The rhotic of this language is a retroflex flap. The alveolar trill, tap, and approximant are all marginal phonemes.

=== Mal Paharia Devanagari Vowels ===
	Front	Center	Back
High	i iː ɪ		u uː ʊ
Mid	e eː ɛ	ə ʌ	o oː
Low			a aː aʰ

Mal Paharia Devanagari has 11 distinguished vowels. Of these vowels, a, e, i, o and u can be short or long. There is also an additional aspirated /a/ vowel. Nasal forms of the vowels also exist. /r/ (ऋ and ॠ) and /l/ (ऌ and ॡ) have "syllabic forms".

==== Diphthongs ====
Mal Paharia has the diphthongs /ai/, /aʊ/ and /oʊ/.

== Script ==
Mal Paharia uses the Devangari script.
