= Kora (tribe) =

Tribes of India

Total population
- 263,178 (2011 census)

Regions with significant populations
- West Bengal: 159,404
- Odisha: 54,408
- Jharkhand: 32,786
- Bihar: 16,580

Languages
- Regional languages • Koda

Religion
- Hinduism • Traditional religion

Related ethnic groups
- Munda people

The Kora (also known as Kuda, Kura, Kaora, Dhangar and Dhanger) are an ethnic group found in the Indian states of West Bengal, Odisha, Jharkhand, and the Bangladeshi division of Rajshahi. The 2011 census showed their population in India to be around 260,000. They are classified as a Scheduled Tribe by the Indian government.

== Etymology ==
The tribe's name Kora and its alternate spellings are possibly originated from Mundari word for earthworks "Koda" .

== History ==
It is speculated that they are an off shoot of Munda tribe. Risley (1894) classified them as a "Hinduised" caste. The Kora are noted for their traditional skills and primary occupation in various earth works such as cutting soil and digging tanks. In course of time they also been engaged in Catechu-making as a professions. This is one of the origins of their alternative names Khaira or Khayra. Now most of them are in farming.

== Subdivisions ==
The tribe is divided into several endogamous groups. The Kora of Odisha claim that they belong to the Suryavansi group while Koras of Santhal Parganas claim to be Nagwanshi. They are further sub-divided into a number of exogamous septs called gotras such as Kaich, Mankad, Khapur, Dhan, Nun, Adower, Nag, Maghi, Prodhan, Bagha, Bahera, etc. These are further divided into patriarchal lineages.

== Culture ==
The Kora mainly speak Bengali in West Bengal and Jharkhand and Odia in Odisha. Only a small number still speak their original Koda language, which belongs to the Munda family.

Kora culture follows a "cline," where those who live further east follow more Hindu customs, while those further west follow more traditionally tribal customs.

The Kora family structure is mostly nuclear. Marriage with same exogamous gotra is prohibited. They are patrilineal and patrilocal. While polygyny is permissible in the Kora society, most marriages are monogamous. At the turn of the 20th century, most Koras in West Bengal practiced infant marriage and had strong taboos around premarital sex, while those of Chota Nagpur practiced adult marriage and had less stringent taboos. Those living in Bankura had a "transitional" set of marriage customs, where adult marriage was the norm but premarital sex was severely stigmatized. Marriage by negotiation is the most common type of marriage. However cross-cousin marriage, junior levirate, junior sororate, marriage by elopement, by capture are also allowed. Divorce, remarriage of widows, widowers and divorcees are also permitted. The groom has to pay the bride price is cash. In Chota Nagpur, the tribe follows Munda customs, while in West Bengal they follow traditional Hindu customs.

They cremate their dead in case of natural death and burial in cases of unnatural deaths. They have a traditional village council panchayat headed by Majhi who is assisted by Parmanik. It plays a central role in ensuring conformity to their social norms and traditions. The tribe overwhelmingly follow Hindu religion. Animist beliefs are also followed by the members. Other religions are followed by very small number of members.

== See also ==
- Tribes of India
- Kisan people
- Kurukh people
