= Malto language =

Dravidian language

Malto
- Paharia
- माल्टो (पहाड़िया), মাল্টো (পাহাড়িয়া)
- Native to: India and Bangladesh
- Region: Jharkhand; West Bengal; Bihar; Odisha
- Ethnicity: Malto; Sauria Paharia
- Native speakers: 159,215 (2011 census)
- Language family: Dravidian: Northern Dravidian; Kurukh–Malto; Malto
- Dialects: Kumarbhag Paharia, Sauria Paharia
- Writing system: Devanagari

Language codes
- ISO 639-3: Either: kmj – Kumarbhag Paharia mjt – Sauria Paharia
- Glottolog: malt1248
- ELP: Sauria Paharia

Malto (Malto: [maːlʈoː], English: /ˈmæltoʊ/ MAL-toh) or Paharia (Malto: [pahaːɽiaː], English: /pəˈhɑːriə/ pə-HAR-ee-ə), or rarely Rajmahali (Malto: [ɾaːdʒmahaliː]), is a Northern Dravidian language spoken primarily in East India by the Malto people.

== Distribution ==
Malto is a North Dravidian language spoken by the Malto or Maler people in Rajmahal Hills of western Jharkhand and eastern Chhattisgarh, but also in West Bengal, Tripura and Orissa.

The 2001 census found 224,926 speakers of Malto, of which 83,050 were labelled as speaking Pahariya, and 141,876 spoke other mother tongues (dialects).

== Varieties ==
Scholarship identifies three dialects: Kumarbhag, Mal Paharia and Sawriya. (Note: However, scholar B. P. Mahapatra, in his 1979 study, recognizes four groups of Pahariyas, namely, Marpaharia, Kumar Paharia (Kumarbhag), Malpaharia, and Sawriya Paharia. The Marpaharia (with an "r") are an Indo-Aryan speaking group and should not be confused with the Malpaharia (with an "l"), which are the Dravidian-speaking ethnic group.) According to Sanford Steever, Malpaharia and Kumarbhag show "more affinity", while Sawriya is more conservative.

Other classification reports only two varieties of Malto that are sometimes regarded as separate languages: Kumarbhag Paharia (Devanagari: कुमारभाग पहाड़िया) and Sauria Paharia (Devanagari: सौरिया पहाड़िया). The former is spoken in the Jharkhand and West Bengal states of India, and tiny pockets of Odisha state, and the latter in the West Bengal, Jharkhand, and Bihar states of India. The lexical similarity between the two is estimated to be 80%.

Mal Paharia language may have a Malto-based substrate.

== Phonology ==
Malto has a typical Dravidian vowel system of 10 vowels: /a, e, i, o, u/ and their lengthened forms. Malto also does not have any vowel clusters or diphthongs.

Consonants
		Bilabial	Dental	Alveolar	Retroflex	Palatal	Velar	Uvular	Glottal
Nasal		m	n̪			ɲ	ŋ		
Stop	voiceless	p	t̪		ʈ	c	k	q	
Stop	voiced	b	d̪		ɖ	ɟ	g	ʁ	
Fricative			ð	s				ʁ	h
Approximant				l					
Rhotic				r	ɽ				

- The cluster /ŋʁ/ is pronounced [ɴɢ].
- Southern and western dialects have /ʔ/ instead of /q/ and /h/ instead of /ʁ/ and /ŋʁ/. Coda /ð/ is an allophone of /d̪/.
- /ʁ/ may actually be a voiced uvular stop [ɢ].

== Writing system ==
Seeing as how the literacy rates amongst the Malto people is very low, it makes sense that the language is not a traditionally written language. When the language had first been memorialized in writing (by Ernest Droese in 1884) it shared the Devanagari writing system as with many languages in India. The written portion of the language being supplemented much later on in its life, gives the effect of Malto remaining authentic through the dialogue of their culture.

== Grammar ==
The general grammar of the language is not dissimilar from that of the surrounding communities. One interesting aspect of their culture influencing the syntax of the language is present in its assignment of gender to nouns.

=== Gender ===
The gender of words in the Malto language is classified as either being masculine, feminine, or neutral. The masculine form is present when denoting anything related to man or vicious deities. Likewise the feminine form is present for nouns denoting women, the Supreme Being, and minor deities. Although the colloquial term for father 'abba' is a traditionally feminine noun, it is meant to show respect. Coupled with the Supreme Being also being feminine, the respect for the women of the community is evident through their grammar. Otherwise nouns are referred to with neutral gender, which by far makes it the most popular form.

== Bibliography ==
- Krishnamurti, Bhadriraju (2003), The Dravidian Languages, Cambridge University Press, ISBN 0-521-77111-0
- Droese, Ernest (1884), Introduction to the Malto Language, Agra: Secundra Orphanage Press
- Frawley, William J. (2003). International encyclopedia of linguistics (2nd ed.). New York: Oxford University Press. p. 468. ISBN 0195139771.
- Comrie, Bernard (November 2000). "Reviewed Work: The Dravidian Languages by Sanford B. Steever". Journal of Linguistics. 36 (3). Cambridge University Press: 640–644. JSTOR 4176629.
- Tuttle, Edwin H. (1923). "Dravidian Z". The American Journal of Philology. 44 (1). The Johns Hopkins University Press: 71–72. doi:10.2307/289648. JSTOR 289648.
