= Korwa people =

Ethnic group of India

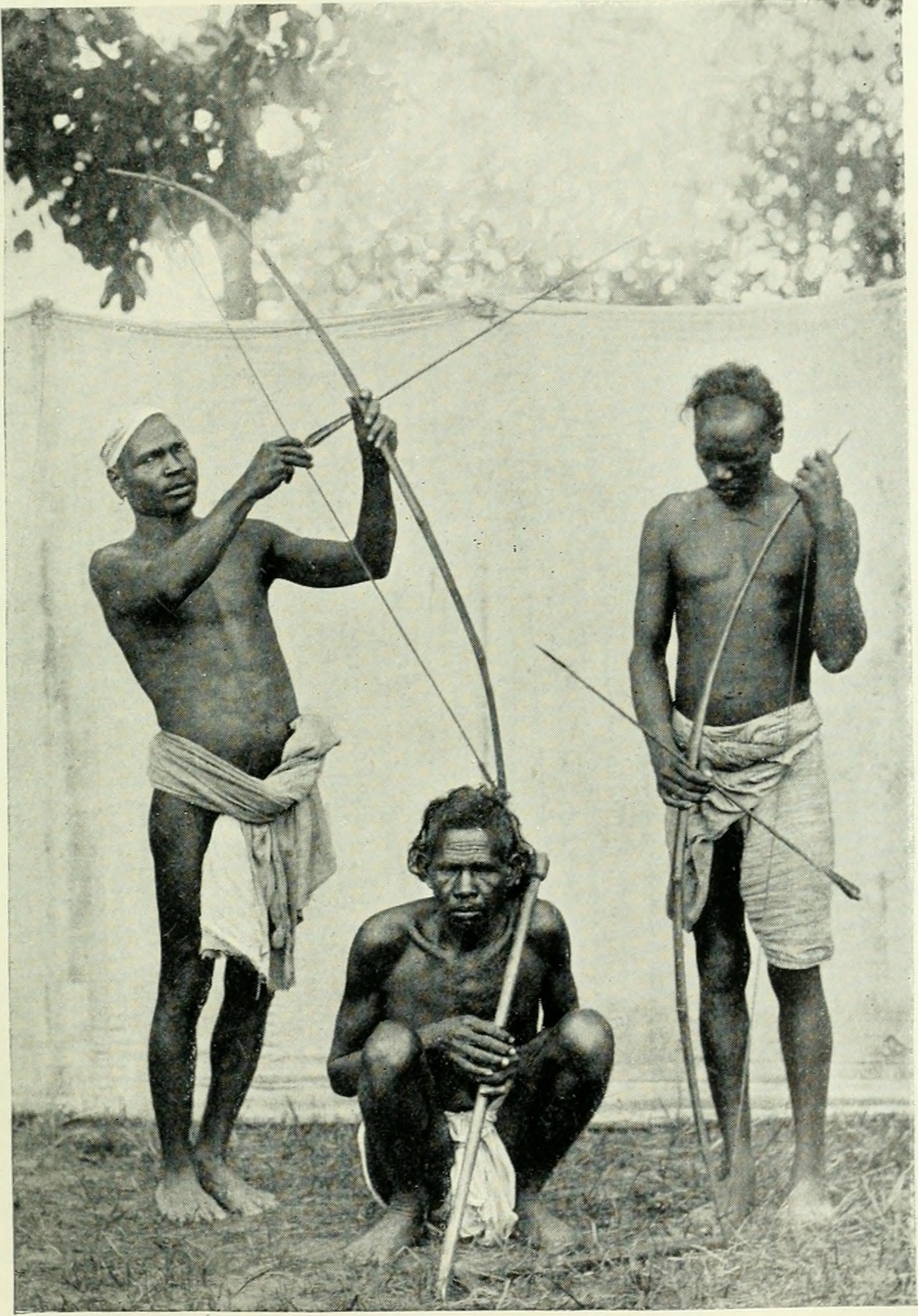
- Photograph of Korwa people, 1897

Total population
- 166,499 (2011, census)

Regions with significant populations
- India
- Chhattisgarh: 129,429
- Jharkhand: 32,786
- West Bengal: 2,912
- Madhya Pradesh: 920
- Bihar: 452

Languages
- Korwa • Chhattisgarhi • Hindi • Regional languages

Religion
- Hinduism • Tribal religion

Related ethnic groups
- Munda peoples

The Korwa people are a Munda ethnic tribe of India. They live mainly on the border of Chhattisgarh and Jharkhand. A small number of Korwa are also found in the neighbouring state of West Bengal, Bihar, Madhya Pradesh. They have sporadic presence in Mirzapur district of Uttar Pradesh.

The Government has implemented several facilities for them, such as roads to their settlements, boys hostels for education, providing agricultural aid, etc. They are a hunter-gatherer community.

The tribe is divided into several subdivisions: the Agaria, Dandh, Dil and Pahadi Korwas.

== Lifestyle ==
The Korwas mainly practice a form of subsistence agriculture called jhoonga kheti. This method of farming involves trimming the forest to support a lentil crop. Previously this involved trimming medium-sized trees, but since the Forest Department became stricter they have cut back shrubs and bushes instead. Originally the trimmed wood would have been burnt but is nowadays taken as fertilizer. The land is tilled without tools and fertilizer. Each family harvests 20 kg of lentils, enough to subsist on until the next season. To supplement their incomes, the Korwas create supas, rice cleaners made of bamboo. The tribe also eats mahua, kanda, sihar and burju fruits when they are in season. They eat all animals, and British writers claimed the Pahadi Korwas used to eat dogs as well.

== Demographics ==
The majority of the Korwa population lives in northeastern Chhattisgarh, with a population of 129,429. A significant minority lives in western Jharkhand, with a population of 35,606. The Korwa in Uttar Pradesh are found mainly in the southern districts of Mirzapur district and Sonbhadra. Their habitat is a hilly, forested and undulating area. The community has four sub-groups- the Agaria Korwa, Dam Korwa, Dih Korwa and Pahar Korwa. They are further divided into seven exogamous clans, namely the Guleria, Haril, Huhar, Leth, Munda, Mura and Pahari. Most Korwa are still hunter gatherers, and are one of the most isolated amongst the communities of Uttar Pradesh. A small number have taken to settled agriculture, and by Brahminisation are being assimilated into Hindu society. However, they have their own deity known as Dih. Each of their settlement contains a shrine to the goddess called a Diwar.

The Korwa Scheduled Caste population in Uttar Pradesh at the 2011 Census of India was 1563.

== Culture ==
The Korwa tribe worships Satbahini Devi. The Pahadia Korwa are divided into four septs: Hezda, Samati, Edikhar and Madikhar. These can all intermarry and interdine. The Deharia Korwas, who were settled cultivators, have three septs: Dewanihar, Dhanuhar and Majhi.

The Hill Korwas live in mud huts with one central room and verandahs around the sides for cooking and sleeping. Some homes are divided into 2 rooms. One variant has the room tiled and thatched. The other variant, called a kumba, is a smaller hut, round in shape and conical at the top. Grass and sal leaves are used as thatch. The house has one room with a low door, and have fences.

Both men and women get tattooed in places where ornaments are worn - on the wrists, neck, above the breasts, legs and ankles, but nowhere near the back and forehead. The dress for men is a loincloth.

The mother tongue of Korwa people is the Korwa language. Alternative names for this language include Ernga and Singli. However, the Korwa people call their language as their Bhashi, which means local language. This language belongs to the Munda branch of the Austroasiatic language family. Korwa people also speak Sadri and Chhattisgarhi as their second language.
