= Kisan people =

Indian tribal group

Kisan
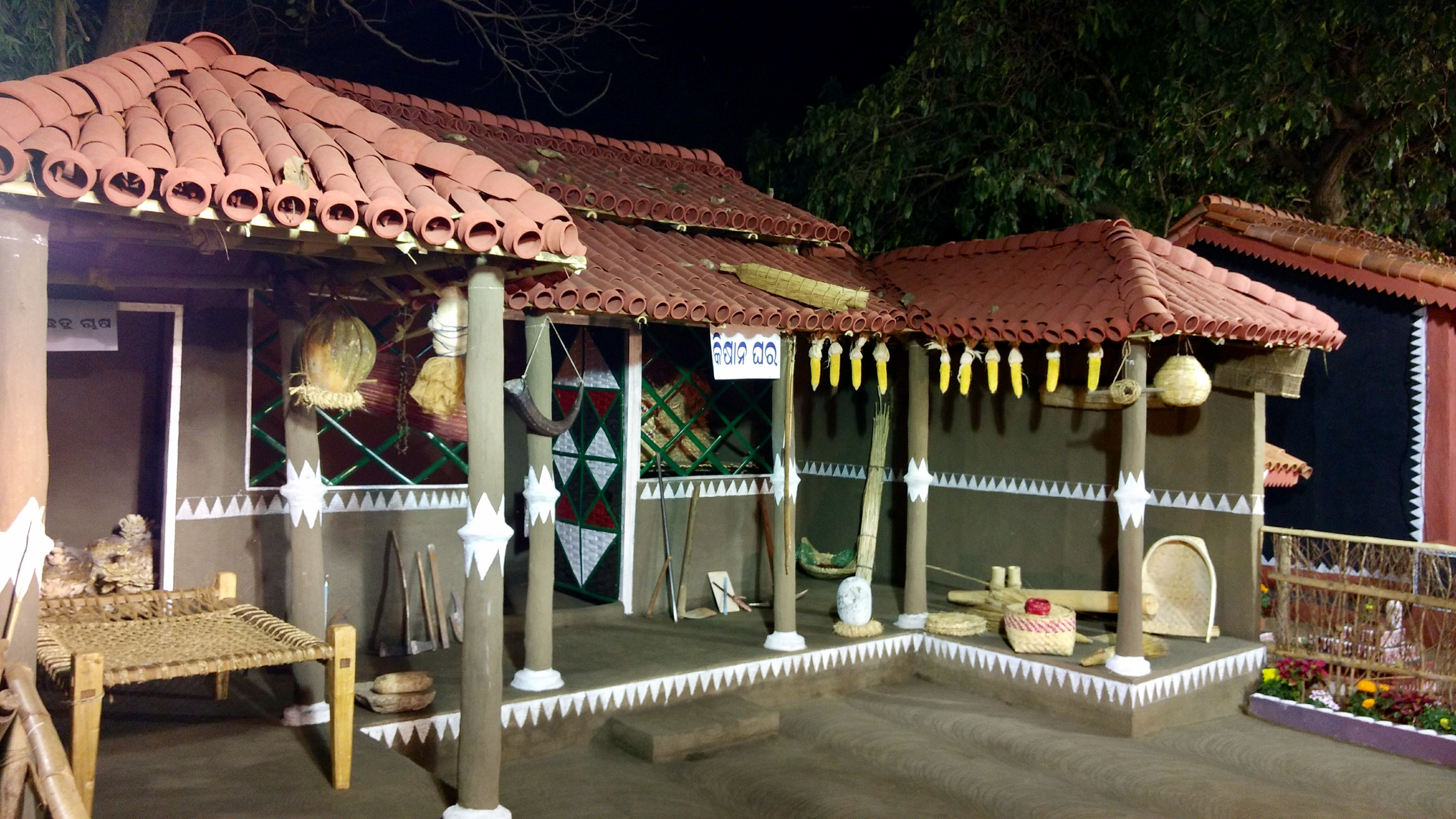
- Kisan house at the 2020 Odisha State Tribal Fair, Bhubaneswar

Total population
- 467,288

Regions with significant populations
- India
- Odisha: 331,589
- West Bengal: 98,434
- Jharkhand: 37,265
- Nepal: 1,739

Languages
- First language Kisan; Second language Hindi • Odia • Bengali • Sambalpuri

Religion
- Hinduism • Traditional religion • Christianity

Related ethnic groups
- Kurukh

The Kisan are a tribal group found in the Indian states of Odisha, West Bengal and Jharkhand. They are traditional farmers and a food gathering people. They speak Kisan, a dialect of Kurukh, as well as Odia and Sambalpuri. The tribe mainly lives in northwestern Odisha, in the districts of Sundergarh, Jharsuguda and Sambalpur. Other populations live in Malda district in western West Bengal and Latehar and Gumla districts of western Jharkhand. They also reside in Nepal's Jhapa district in small number (around 1,000).

== Geographic distribution ==
=== Kisan people in India ===
According to the 2011 Census of India, the Kisan people were registered to dwell in Odisha, where the largest population was registered. The tribe mainly lives in northwestern Odisha, in the districts of Sundergarh, Jharsuguda and Sambalpur.

Aside from Odisha, the Census reported populations of Kisan in West Bengal, Assam, Manipur, Arunachal Pradesh, Jharkhand, Maharashtra, and Himachal Pradesh.

=== Kisan people in Nepal ===
The Central Bureau of Statistics of Nepal classifies the Kisan as a subgroup within the broader social group of Terai Janajati. At the time of the 2011 Nepal census, 1,739 people (0.0% of the population of Nepal) were Kisan. The frequency of Kisan people by province was as follows:

- Gandaki Province (0.0%)
- Koshi Province (0.0%)
- Bagmati Province (0.0%)
- Karnali Province (0.0%)
- Lumbini Province (0.0%)
- Madhesh Province (0.0%)
- Sudurpashchim Province (0.0%)

The frequency of Kisan people was higher than national average (0.0%) in the following districts:

- Myagdi (0.5%)
- Jhapa (0.1%)

== Culture ==
=== Marriage ===
The Kisan community practise endogamy and exogamy. Most practice monogamy, but bigamy is also accepted. The community practices adult marriage. Marriage within the same bansa is also forbidden, since they share a bloodline. However, since bansa is patrilineal, marriage with the maternal uncle's daughter is accepted and common. Widows are allowed to remarry.

The Kisan recognise several forms of marriage common to tribal groups of central and eastern India: marriage by negotiation (arranged marriage), marriage by capture, love marriage, marriage by intrusion, marriage by adoption and marriage by exchange. Of these, marriage by negotiation is the most common, and is known as benja. In this marriage, the father or guardian of the person to be married selects the partner. In these negotiations the village headman is consulted.

The benja process is as follows. The agua, a mediator who negotiates between the two families, approaches the bride's father to ask for his daughter's hand in marriage for the groom. Then the groom and his family visit the bride's house with gifts of rice, handia (rice-beer), and animals. By the taking of the food, the bride's family accepts the groom's proposal. The groom's party prepares their food, celebrates with the bride's family in the evening, and returns to their village. The bride's relatives then visit the groom's village. Next, the two families settle on a bride price, called kania muli hessu or sukha mula. The price is paid in rice and may be 10 khani, equivalent to 1 quintal of rice, and is paid by the groom's father to the bride's family. One the kania mula is settled, the date of marriage is fixed with the consent of the kalo, or village priest. Since marriage is time-consuming it can only take place after the harvest, where there is little work to do in the field.

The marriage ceremony is common to tribes of central and eastern India. On the morning of the marriage day, the groom's barat (wedding procession) arrives at the bride's village with handia. They, along with relatives of the bride, escort her to the groom's village. On the village outskirts, the relatives of the bride and groom stage a mock fight, after which the bride is welcomed into the groom's house. The groom and bride and their parents wear clothes of red, yellow and white: never black. In the evening, the bride and groom and led to a pandal in the courtyard of the groom's house. Their rice is cooked in a new pot. The kalo then worships the Dharme Belas, supreme gods. The groom applies vermillion on the bride's forehead and their clothes are tied together, usually by the bride's sister. and the two walk around the pandal 7 times invoking the Dharme Belas. Afterwards there is celebration, dancing and feasting throughout the night.

A marriage is considered successful when the couple have had a child. Divorce is permitted in cases of adultery, impotency or cruelty, or if the marriage just does not work out. Remarriage of widows, widowers and divorcees is also permitted. A widow can marry her younger brother-in-law while widowers can similarly marry their younger sister-in-laws.

Marriage practices have changed in recent years, with the greater influence of broader Odia culture and modernisation. The bride's father now welcomes the barat of the groom to his house before accompanying her to the house of the bridegroom. In addition, instead of using a palaki to carry the bride and groom to the groom's house as was the case in earlier days, a cycle or rickshaw is used now. The members of the barat are now served mahua liquor instead of handia, along with meat and rice, at the bride's house. The post-ceremony dances and celebrations were previously done to the sound of mandar drums, while now loudspeakers are used.

== Language ==
The Kisan people speak the Kisan language, also known as kunha, sometimes considered an independent member of the North Dravidian group of the Dravidian languages. However, the scholarly opinion is that Kisan is to be understood as a dialect of Kurukh.

According to the Language Atlas of India, based on 1991 data, speakers of Kisan concentrated in the state of Orissa, totalling 162,088 speakers. By the 2011 Census, a significant number of speakers is still reported in Odisha, numbering 1,94,716 speakers of a total of 2,06,100.

== See also ==
- Kora (tribe)
