= Mal Paharia people =

Mal Paharia
Total population
- 182,560 (2011 census)

Regions with significant populations
- India
- Jharkhand: 135,797
- West Bengal: 44,538
- Bihar: 2,225
- Assam: 6,389 (1951 est.)

Languages
- First language Malto • Mal Paharia; Second language Bengali • Hindi

Religion
- Hinduism • Christianity • Islam

Related ethnic groups
- Malto • Kurukh • Kisan

The Mal Paharia people, also known as Maler or Malers, are an indigenous people of India, mainly living in the states of Jharkhand and West Bengal. They are the original inhabitants of the Rajmahal Hills, known today as the Santal Parganas division of Jharkhand. They are listed as a Scheduled Tribe by the governments of West Bengal, Bihar and Jharkhand. They speak the Malto language, a Dravidian language, as well as a poorly-documented Indo-Aryan Mal Paharia language.

== History ==
During Muslim rule in Bengal, the Mal Paharias developed a friendly relationship with local landlords. Under this agreement, Mal Paharia lands were divided into tappa headed by sardars, who in turn had authority over the manjhi: village head. The sardars acted as a lawkeeping force among the Mal Paharia in return for which they were given a certain amount of land by the plains people. Passes leading to the hills were guarded by Mal Paharia outposts as well as forts of the plains people. This system ensured relatively friendly relationships between the hill and plains people. Once a year, this arrangement was renewed with a feast in the plains between the landlords and sardars.

However, when the Mal Paharias tried to assert their independence again, they were betrayed by the Zamindars who killed many of their headmen and lead them into becoming raiders. Travel on the south bank of the Ganga near Rajmahal Hills became almost impossible, and British messengers were robbed and murdered. Despite many British attempts to suppress them, the Mal Paharias fought back by luring British forces into the jungle, where the British rifles were useless and Paharia's poisoned arrows were ideal. Finally, in 1778, the British proposed a "pacification" scheme where money and lands were restored to the sardars, and the forts of the landlords were taken over by EIC officials. Many Mal Paharias were recruited into a new British force: first using traditional bows and arrows, and eventually using British weaponry. This Paharia regiment, the Bhagalpur Hill Rangers, continued until the 1857 revolt and the reorganisation of British forces there.

The government also tried to settle the Mal Paharias in the plains as settled agriculturalists to make the land productive, but this did not work. Instead, the British brought in Santal cultivators from the southeastern part of the Chota Nagpur Plateau, who settled in the wasteland in large numbers starting in the 1830s. The Mal Paharias fiercely resisted the entry of the Santals into their lands, a struggle that would continue until the 1850s when Santal numbers became overwhelming. The entry of the Santals generally cut the Mal Paharias off from significant contact with those in the plains. Eventually, their territory became known as Santal Parganas. Santal Parganas would continue to be a division of various administrative units, most recently the state of Jharkhand created in 2000.

Today, the Paharias have become an insignificant minority in their own lands. Their literacy rate is an abysmal 1%, despite the many government schemes that have tried to uplift them. Most villages of the tribe lack basic facilities such as drinking water or sanitation, very few have government jobs and none have become involved in politics. The Paharias have formed several associations to fight for the restoration of their lands and the upliftment of their socio economic condition.

== Society ==
The Mal Paharias who live in the southern hills of Damin-i-koh and in the south and east of Santhal Parganas have been Hinduised. Among themselves they speak a variety of Bengali, but with others they speak Bengali and Hindi. The Bengali and Devenagari scripts are used by them. The Mal Paharias survive on agriculture and forest produce. Rice is their staple food. Pulses like moong, masur, Kulthi and lar are consumed. They are non-vegetarians, but do not eat beef. Both men and women drink liquor, which may be home-made or bought from the market. They smoke indigenous cheroots, and chew tobacco mixed with lime (khaini) and betel.

== Religion ==
The Mal Paharias follow a solar deity called Dharmer Gosain like their Sauria Paharia counterparts.

== See also ==
- Mal (caste)
