= Sauria Paharia people =

Sauria Paharia
Total population
- 51,634 (2011 census)

Regions with significant populations
- Bangladesh India
- Jharkhand: 46,222
- Sylhet: 5,000
- West Bengal: 3,480
- Bihar: 1,932

Languages
- Malto • Sylheti • Hindi • Bengali

Religion
- Hinduism and Christianity • Folk Religion

Related ethnic groups
- Oraon • Kumarbhag Paharia • Mal Paharia

The Sauria Paharia people are a Dravidian ethnic people of Bangladesh and the Indian states of Jharkhand, West Bengal, and Bihar. They are found mostly in Santhal Parganas region in the Rajmahal Hills.

== Origins ==
According to Kurukh traditions, when they were driven out of their home in the Son valley, the main group migrated towards Palamu, but a smaller group moved down the Gangetic valley till they reached Rajmahal Hills, where they settled mostly in Damin-i-koh. The language of the Sauria Paharias is closely linked to that of the Oraons.

== Demographics ==
Sauria Paharias are listed as a primitive tribe and have a population of around 45,000 in Jharkhand, with a possible negligible population in West Bengal. They constitute less than 1 per cent of the tribal population in Jharkhand.

== Religion ==
The Sauria Paharias mainly worship their ancestral spirits, known as Jiwe Urkkya ("the spirit that has left"), especially before sowing a new field. The Jiwe Urkkya is at first a fierce spirit, until a feast is given on the 5th day after the funeral, after which he becomes benevolent. Afterwards, the death anniversary, known as Bhoje, is celebrated by karra pujar, animal sacrifices. For the Karra pujar, the buffalo is most preferred. The feasts and offerings to ancestors are given by the demano, the village priest, who is believed to speak with the voices of the Jiwe Urkkya. Offerings are typically made during harvest season or during the Bandana festival. Ancestral worship is important for Saurias because they believe that, once he is satiated with offerings, he joins Bero Gosaiyya, the sun god.

The Saurias also worship a group of spirits called Gosain. These are associated with every phenomenon in the world around them. The Saurias make a distinction between male and female Gosain, but each village has different conceptions of which Gosain are male and which are female. The names of the Gosain are generally local to their area, and vary depending on the village. The home deity is represented by a door and is worshipped during the construction of a new house. The Gomo (pillar of the house) Gosain provides health and well-being, and the Sohar Gosain lives in the cattle shed and protects the cattle from harm. The Saurias also believe in evil spirits, called Alchi or Bhoote, as well as witchcraft (Chargani).

The most important place for veneration of the Gosain is the Manjhi Than, where the most significant Gosain is worshipped. This Gosain is male and is represented by five black stones under a small tree. The Manjhiya makes two sacrifices a year: one during the Bandana festival and just before sowing in a Kurwa field. Female Gosains are worshipped at the Gosain Adda and Bender Nadu, at which are sacrificed black fowl and pigs respectively. The Chal Nadu, on the nearest hilltop, is the place at which sacrifices are conducted if a calamity befalls the village.

== Society ==
Sauria Paharias practice shifting cultivation, called jhum. They lead family lives.

The Saurias are divided into three distinct cultural groups, namely the Probia, the Bare and the Chete.
