= Belbadda =

Belbadda Balbadda
- Village
- Location in Jharkhand, India Belbadda (India)
- Coordinates: 25.150667°N 87.322389°E
- Country: India
- State: Jharkhand
- District: Godda

Population (2011)
  - Total: 3,024

Languages (*For language details see Meharama#Language and religion)
  - Official: Hindi, Urdu
- Time zone: UTC+5:30 (IST)
- PIN: 814160
- Telephone/ STD code: 06437
- Lok Sabha constituency: Godda
- Vidhan Sabha constituency: Mahagama
- Website: godda.nic.in

Belbadda (also spelled Balbadda) is a village in Meharama CD block in Godda subdivision of Godda district in the Indian state of Jharkhand.

== Geography ==
Cities, towns and locations in the Sahibganj, Godda and Pakur districts in Santhal Pargana Division
M: municipality, CT: census town, R: rural/ urban centre, H: historical/ religious/ tourist centre
Owing to space constraints in the small map, the actual locations in a larger map may vary slightly

=== Location ===
Belbadda is located at 25.150667°N 87.322389°E.

Belbadda has an area of 124.64 hectares (308.0 acres).

=== Overview ===
The map shows a hilly area with the Rajmahal hills running from the bank of the Ganges in the extreme north to the south, beyond the area covered by the map into Dumka district. ‘Farakka’ is marked on the map and that is where Farakka Barrage is, just inside West Bengal. Rajmahal coalfield is shown in the map. The area is overwhelmingly rural with only small pockets of urbanisation.

Note: On the full screen map, all places marked on the map are linked and you can easily move on to another page of your choice. Enlarge the map to see what else is there – one gets railway links, more road links and so on.

== Demographics ==
According to the 2011 Census of India, Belbadda had a population of 3,024, of which 1,525 (50%) were males and 1,499 (50%) were females. Population in the age range 0–6 years was 482. The total number of literate persons in Belbadda was 1,487 (72.66% of the population over 6 years).

== Civic administration ==
=== Police station ===
Belbadda police station serves Meharama CD block.

== Education ==
Government High School Balbadda is a Hindi-medium coeducational institution established in 1950. It has facilities for teaching from class IX to class XII.

Kasturba Gandhi Balika Vidyalaya Meherama is a Hindi-medium girls only institution established in 2006. It has facilities for teaching from class VI to class XII.
