= Lalmatia, Godda =

Cities in Jharkhand, India

Lalmatia
- Village
- Location in Jharkhand, India Lalmatia (India)
- Coordinates: 25.055611°N 87.363722°E
- Country: India
- State: Jharkhand
- District: Godda

Population (2011)
  - Total: 1,208

Languages (*For language details see Boarijore#Language and religion)
  - Official: Hindi, Urdu
- Time zone: UTC+5:30 (IST)
- PIN: 813208
- Telephone/ STD code: 06437
- Lok Sabha constituency: Godda
- Vidhan Sabha constituency: Mahagama
- Website: godda.nic.in

Lalmatia is a village in the Boarijore CD block in the Godda subdivision of the Godda district in the Indian state of Jharkhand.

== Geography ==
Cities, towns and locations in the Sahibganj, Godda and Pakur districts in Santhal Pargana Division
M: municipality, CT: census town, R: rural/ urban centre, H: historical/ religious/ tourist centre
Owing to space constraints in the small map, the actual locations in a larger map may vary slightly

=== Location ===
Lalmtia is located at 25.055611°N 87.36372222°E.

Lalmatia has an area of 52 hectares (130 acres).

=== Overview ===
The map shows a hilly area with the Rajmahal hills running from the bank of the Ganges in the extreme north to the south, beyond the area covered by the map into Dumka district. ‘Farakka’ is marked on the map and that is where Farakka Barrage is, just inside West Bengal. Rajmahal coalfield is shown in the map. The entire area is overwhelmingly rural with only small pockets of urbanisation.

== Demographics ==
According to the 2011 Census of India, Lalmatia had a total population of 1,208, of which 720 (60%) were males and 488 (40%) were females. Population in the age range 0–6 years was 183. The total number of literate persons in Lalmatia was 786 (76.68% of the population over 6 years).

== Civic administration ==
=== Police station ===
Lalmatia police station serves Boarijore CD block.

== Economy ==
A major coal mining project of Eastern Coalfields Limited (Rajmahal open cast project, a part of Rajmahal coalfield) is going on in Boarijore, Mahagama and Sunderpahari CD blocks. Please see the satellite view of the Google map.

== Education ==
Jawahar Navodaya Vidyalaya Lalmatia is a Hindi-medium coeducational institution established in 1987. It has facilities for teaching from class VI to class XII.

Adwasi Inter College, Lalmatia is a Hindi-medium coeducation institution established in 1985. It has facilities for teaching in classes XI and XII.

Government High School Lalmatia is a Hindi-medium coeducational institution established in 1961. It has facilities for teaching in classes IX and X.
