= Hanwara =

- Village
- Location in Jharkhand, India Hanwara (India)
- Coordinates: 25.080879°N 87.223043°E
- Country: India
- State: Jharkhand
- District: Godda

Population (2011)
  - Total: 4,128

Languages (*For language details see Mahagama (community development block)#Language and religion)
  - Official: Hindi, Urdu
- Time zone: UTC+5:30 (IST)
- PIN: 814154
- Telephone/ STD code: 06437
- Lok Sabha constituency: Godda
- Vidhan Sabha constituency: Mahagama
- Website: godda.nic.in

Hanwara is a village in the Mahagama CD block in the Godda subdivision of the Godda district in the Indian state of Jharkhand.

== Geography ==
Cities, towns and locations in the Sahibganj, Godda and Pakur districts in Santhal Pargana Division
M: municipality, CT: census town, R: rural/ urban centre, H: historical/ religious/ tourist centre
Owing to space constraints in the small map, the actual locations in a larger map may vary slightly

=== Location ===
Hanwara is located at 25.080879°N 87.223043°E.

Hanwara has an area of 293 hectares (720 acres).

=== Overview ===
The map shows a hilly area with the Rajmahal hills running from the bank of the Ganges in the extreme north to the south, beyond the area covered by the map into Dumka district. ‘Farakka’ is marked on the map and that is where Farakka Barrage is, just inside West Bengal. Rajmahal coalfield is shown in the map. The area is overwhelmingly rural with only small pockets of urbanisation.

Note: The full screen map is interesting. All places marked on the map are linked and you can easily move on to another page of your choice. Enlarge the map to see what else is there – one gets railway links, many more road links and so on.

== Demographics ==
According to the 2011 Census of India, Hanwara had a total population of 4,128, of which 2,175 (53%) were males and 1,953 (47%) were females. Population in the age range 0–6 years was 864. The number of literate persons in Hanwara was 1,811 (55.48% of the population over 6 years).

== Civic administration ==
=== Police station ===
Hanwara police station serves Mahagama CD block.

== Education ==
Hanwara Government High School is a Hindi-medium coeducational institution established in 1975. It has facilities for teaching in classes IX and X.
