= Bara Boarijore =

- Village
- Location in Jharkhand, India Bara Boarijore (India)
- Coordinates: 25.065611°N 87.472322°E
- Country: India
- State: Jharkhand
- District: Godda

Population (2011)
  - Total: 2,423

Languages (*For language details see Boarijore#Language and religion)
  - Official: Hindi, Urdu
- Time zone: UTC+5:30 (IST)
- PIN: 813208
- Telephone/ STD code: 06437
- Lok Sabha constituency: Godda
- Vidhan Sabha constituency: Mahagama
- Website: godda.nic.in

Bara Boarijore is a village in the Boarijore CD block in the Godda subdivision of the Godda district in the Indian state of Jharkhand.

== Geography ==
Cities, towns and locations in the Sahibganj, Godda and Pakur districts in Santhal Pargana Division
M: municipality, CT: census town, R: rural/ urban centre, H: historical/ religious/ tourist centre
Owing to space constraints in the small map, the actual locations in a larger map may vary slightly

=== Location ===
Bara Boarijor is located at 25.065611°N 87.472322°E.

Bara Boarijore has an area of 200 hectares (490 acres).

=== Overview ===
The map shows a hilly area with the Rajmahal hills running from the bank of the Ganges in the extreme north to the south, beyond the area covered by the map into Dumka district. ‘Farakka’ is marked on the map and that is where Farakka Barrage is, just inside West Bengal. Rajmahal coalfield is shown in the map. The entire area is overwhelmingly rural with only small pockets of urbanisation.

Note: The interactive map displays hyperlinked locations for navigation across related pages. Expanding the map reveals additional features, including railway networks and extended road connections.

== Demographics ==
According to the 2011 Census of India, Bara Boarijore had a total population of 2,423, of which 1,195 (49%) were males and 1,228 (51%) were females. Population in the age range 0–6 years was 466. The total number of literate persons in Bara Boarijore was 1,377 (70.36% of the population over 6 years).

== Civic administration ==
=== Police station ===
Boarijore police station serves Boarijore CD block.

=== CD block HQ ===
Headquarters of Boarijore CD block is at Boarijore village.

== Education ==
Government High School Boarijore is a Hindi-medium coeducational institution established in 1963. It has facilities for teaching from class IX to class XII.

Government Model School Boarijore is an English-medium coeducational school established in 2012. It has facilities for teaching from class VI to class XII.

Kasturba Gandhi Balika Vidyalaya Boarijore is a Hindi-medium, girls only institution established in 2006. It has facilities for teaching from class VI to class XII.
