= Dhamri =

- Village
- Location in Jharkhand, India Dhamri (India)
- Coordinates: 25.211867°N 87.391189°E
- Country: India
- State: Jharkhand
- District: Godda

Languages (*For language details see Meharama#Language and religion)
  - Official: Hindi, Urdu
- Time zone: UTC+5:30 (IST)
- PIN: 814160
- Telephone/ STD code: 06437
- Lok Sabha constituency: Godda
- Vidhan Sabha constituency: Mahagama
- Website: godda.nic.in

Dhamri is a village in Meharama CD block in Godda subdivision of Godda district in the Indian state of Jharkhand.

== Geography ==
Cities, towns and locations in the Sahibganj, Godda and Pakur districts in Santhal Pargana Division
M: municipality, CT: census town, R: rural/ urban centre, H: historical/ religious/ tourist centre
Owing to space constraints in the small map, the actual locations in a larger map may vary slightly

=== Location ===
Dhamri is located at 25.211867°N 87.391189°E.

According to 2011 census, Dhamri is spread over two mouzas - Dhamri Saheb and Dhamri Gopalram. Dhamri Saheb has an area of 45 hectares (110 acres) and Dhamri Gopalram an area of 51 hectares (130 acres).

=== Overview ===
The map shows a hilly area with the Rajmahal hills running from the bank of the Ganges in the extreme north to the south, beyond the area covered by the map into Dumka district. ‘Farakka’ is marked on the map and that is where Farakka Barrage is, just inside West Bengal. Rajmahal coalfield is shown in the map. The entire area is overwhelmingly rural with only small pockets of urbanisation.

Note: The full screen map is interesting. All places marked on the map are linked and you can easily move on to another page of your choice. Enlarge the map to see what else is there – one gets railway links, many more road links and so on.

== Demographics ==
According to the 2011 Census of India, Dhamri Saheb had a total population of 696. The total number of literate persons in Dhamri Saheb was 305 (55.25% of the population over 6 years). Dhamri Gopalram had a total population of 51. The total number of literate persons in Dhamri Gopalram was 108 (32.41% of the population over 6 years).

== Education ==
S.R.T. College, Dhamri was established a visionary and education enthusiast Shri Raghunandan Tiwari in 1961. It is a constituent college of Sido Kanhu Murmu University. Subjects taught are: English, Hindi, Urdu, Sanskrit, political science, history, sociology, geography, economics, philosophy, physics, chemistry, mathematics, botany and zoology. It offers both honours and general courses in arts and science.
