= Basantrai, Godda =

Basantrai
- Village
- Location in Jharkhand, India Basantrai (India)
- Coordinates: 24.994944°N 87.202139°E
- Country: India
- State: Jharkhand
- District: Godda

Population (2011)
  - Total: 581

Languages (*For language details see Basantrai#Language and religion)
  - Official: Hindi, Urdu
- Time zone: UTC+5:30 (IST)
- PIN: 814155
- Telephone/ STD code: 06437
- Lok Sabha constituency: Godda
- Vidhan Sabha constituency: Godda
- Website: godda.nic.in

Basantrai is a village in the Basantrai CD block in the Godda subdivision of the Godda district in the Indian state of Jharkhand.

== Geography ==
Cities, towns and locations in the Sahibganj, Godda and Pakur districts in Santhal Pargana Division
M: municipality, CT: census town, R: rural/ urban centre, H: historical/ religious/ tourist centre
Owing to space constraints in the small map, the actual locations in a larger map may vary slightly

=== Location ===
Basantrai is located at approximately 24.994944°N 87.202139°E.

Basantrai has an area of 16.79 hectares (41.5 acres).

=== Overview ===
The map shows a hilly area with the Rajmahal hills running from the bank of the Ganges in the extreme north to the south, beyond the area covered by the map into Dumka district. ‘Farakka’ is marked on the map and that is where Farakka Barrage is, just inside West Bengal. Rajmahal coalfield is shown in the map. The entire area is overwhelmingly rural with only small pockets of urbanisation.

Note: All places marked on the map are linked and you can easily move on to another page of your choice. Enlarge the map to see what else is there – one gets railway links, many more road links and so on.

== Demographics ==
According to the 2011 Census of India, Basantrai had a total population of 581, of which 307(53%) were males and 274 (47%) were females. Population in the age range 0–6 years was 120. The total number of literate persons in Basantrai was 393 (85.25% of the population over 6 years).

== Civic administration ==
=== Police station ===
Basantrai police station serves the Basantrai CD block.

=== CD block HQ ===
Headquarters of Basantrai CD block is at Basantrai village.

== Education ==
M.A. Kalam Azad Degree College, Basantrai, is affiliated with Sido Kanhu Murmu University. Established in 1985, this college has facilities for teaching in classes XI and XII (Intermediate).
