= Mehrma =

Mehrma Meharma
- Village
- Location in Jharkhand, India Mehrma (India)
- Coordinates: 25.203667°N 87.371389°E
- Country: India
- State: Jharkhand
- District: Godda

Population (2011)
  - Total: 2,358

Languages (*For language details see Meharama#Language and religion)
  - Official: Hindi, Urdu
- Time zone: UTC+5:30 (IST)
- PIN: 814160
- Telephone/ STD code: 06437
- Lok Sabha constituency: Godda
- Vidhan Sabha constituency: Mahagama
- Website: godda.nic.in

Mehrma (also spelled Meharma) is a village in Meharama CD block in Godda subdivision of Godda district in the Indian state of Jharkhand.

== Geography ==
Cities, towns and locations in the Sahibganj, Godda and Pakur districts in Santhal Pargana Division
M: municipality, CT: census town, R: rural/ urban centre, H: historical/ religious/ tourist centre
Owing to space constraints in the small map, the actual locations in a larger map may vary slightly

=== Location ===
Mehrma is located at 25.203667°N 87.371389°E.

Mehrma has an area of 230.41 hectares (569.4 acres).

=== Overview ===
The map shows a hilly area with the Rajmahal hills running from the bank of the Ganges in the extreme north to the south, beyond the area covered by the map into Dumka district. ‘Farakka’ is marked on the map and that is where Farakka Barrage is, just inside West Bengal. Rajmahal coalfield is shown in the map. The entire area is overwhelmingly rural with only small pockets of urbanisation.

Note: All locations marked on the map are hyperlinked, allowing for easy navigation to the corresponding pages. The full-screen map includes other details, including railway links and road links.

== Demographics ==
According to the 2011 Census of India, Mehrma had a total population of 2,358, of which 1,226 (52%) were males and 1,132 (48%) were females. Population in the age range 0–6 years was 419. The total number of literate persons in Mehrma was 837 (43.17% of the population over 6 years).

== Civic administration ==
=== Police station ===
Mehrma police station serves Meharama CD block.

=== CD block HQ ===
Headquarters of Meharama CD block is at Mehrma village.

== Education ==
Project Girls High School is a Hindi-medium girls only institution established in 1981. It has facilities for teaching in classes IX and X.
