= Sarauni =

- Census Town
- Location in Jharkhand, India Sarauni (India)
- Coordinates: 24.814333°N 87.324167°E
- Country: India
- State: Jharkhand
- District: Godda

Area
  - Total: 3.71 km^{2} (1.43 sq mi)

Population (2011)
  - Total: 4,970
  - Density: 1,340/km^{2} (3,470/sq mi)

Languages (*For language details see Godda (community development block)#Language and religion)
  - Official: Hindi, Urdu
- Time zone: UTC+5:30 (IST)
- PIN: 814156
- Telephone/ STD code: 06422
- Lok Sabha constituency: Godda
- Vidhan Sabha constituency: Mahagama
- Website: godda.nic.in

Sarauni is a census town in Godda CD block in Godda subdivision of Godda district in the Indian state of Jharkhand.

== Geography ==
Cities, towns and locations in the Sahibganj, Godda and Pakur districts in Santhal Pargana Division
M: municipality, CT: census town, R: rural/ urban centre, H: historical/ religious/ tourist centre
Owing to space constraints in the small map, the actual locations in a larger map may vary slightly

=== Location ===
Sarauni is located at 24.814333°N 87.324167°E.

Sarauni has an area of 3.71 square kilometres (1.43 sq mi).

== Overview ==
The map shows a hilly area with the Rajmahal hills running from the bank of the Ganges in the extreme north to the south, beyond the area covered by the map into Dumka district. ‘Farakka’ is marked on the map and that is where Farakka Barrage is, just inside West Bengal. Rajmahal coalfield is shown in the map. The entire area is overwhelmingly rural with only small pockets of urbanisation.

== Demographics ==
According to the 2011 Census of India, Sarauni had a total population of 4,970, of which 2,542 (51%) were males and 2,428 (49%) were females. Population in the age range 0–6 years was 856. The total number of literate persons in Sarauni was 2,723 (66.19% of the population over 6 years).

== Infrastructure ==
According to the District Census Handbook 2011, Godda, Sarauni covered an area of 3.71 km^{2}. Among the civic amenities, it had 10 km roads with open drains, the protected water supply involved hand pump, uncovered well. It had 211 domestic electric connections, 5 road light points. Among the educational facilities it had 2 primary schools, 1 middle school, 1 secondary school, 1 senior secondary school. It had the branch office of 1 cooperative bank.
