= Parsa, Godda =

Parsa
- Village
- Location in Jharkhand, India Parsa (India)
- Coordinates: 25.055467°N 87.211189°E
- Country: India
- State: Jharkhand
- District: Godda

Population (2011)
  - Total: 6,101

Languages (*For language details see Mahagama (community development block)#Language and religion)
  - Official: Hindi, Urdu
- Time zone: UTC+5:30 (IST)
- PIN: 814155
- Telephone/ STD code: 06437
- Lok Sabha constituency: Godda
- Vidhan Sabha constituency: Mahagama
- Website: godda.nic.in

Parsa is a village in Mahagama CD block in Godda subdivision of Godda district in the Indian state of Jharkhand.

== Geography ==
Cities, towns and locations in the Sahibganj, Godda and Pakur districts in Santhal Pargana Division
M: municipality, CT: census town, R: rural/ urban centre, H: historical/ religious/ tourist centre
Owing to space constraints in the small map, the actual locations in a larger map may vary slightly

=== Location ===
Parsa is located at 25.055467°N 87.211189°E.

Parsa has an area of 414.28 hectares (1,023.7 acres).

=== Overview ===
The map shows a hilly area with the Rajmahal hills running from the bank of the Ganges in the extreme north to the south, beyond the area covered by the map into Dumka district. ‘Farakka’ is marked on the map and that is where Farakka Barrage is, just inside West Bengal. Rajmahal coalfield is shown in the map. The area is overwhelmingly rural with only small pockets of urbanisation.

== Demographics ==
According to the 2011 Census of India, Parsa had a total population of 6,101, of which 3,186 (52%) were males and 2,915 (48%) were females. Population in the age range 0–6 years was 1,343. The total number of literate persons in Parsa was 2,293 (48.19% of the population over 6 years).

== Education ==
Millat College at Parsa was established in 1972. It is a constituent college of Sido Kanhu Murmu University. Subjects taught are: Hindi, English, Sanskrit, Urdu, Persian, Santali, economics, history, political science, sociology, philosophy, mathematics, psychology, geography, Home Science. It offers honours and general courses in arts. Millat College also has facilities for teaching in classes XI and XI (Intermediate).

Millat High School at Parsa is a Hindi-medium coeducation institution established in 1946. It has facilities for teaching in classes IX and X.
