= Dewdanr =

Dewdanr Deodanr
- Village
- Location in Jharkhand, India Dewdanr (India)
- Coordinates: 24.644056°N 87.308311°E
- Country: India
- State: Jharkhand
- District: Godda

Population (2011)
  - Total: 12

Languages (*For language details see Poraiyahat (community development block)#Language and religion)
  - Official: Hindi, Urdu
- Time zone: UTC+5:30 (IST)
- PIN: 814147
- Telephone/ STD code: 06422
- Lok Sabha constituency: Godda
- Vidhan Sabha constituency: Poreyahat
- Website: godda.nic.in

Dewdanr is a village in the Poraiyahat CD block in the Godda subdivision of the Godda district in the Indian state of Jharkhand.

== Geography ==
Cities, towns and locations in the Sahibganj, Godda and Pakur districts in Santhal Pargana Division
M: municipality, CT: census town, R: rural/ urban centre, H: historical/ religious/ tourist centre
Owing to space constraints in the small map, the actual locations in a larger map may vary slightly

=== Location ===
Dewdanr is located at 24.644056°N 87.308311°E.

Dewdanr has an area of 93 hectares (230 acres).

=== Overview ===
The map shows a hilly area with the Rajmahal hills running from the bank of the Ganges in the extreme north to the south, beyond the area covered by the map into Dumka district. ‘Farakka’ is marked on the map and that is where Farakka Barrage is, just inside West Bengal. Rajmahal coalfield is shown in the map. The area is overwhelmingly rural with only small pockets of urbanisation.

== Demographics ==
According to the 2011 Census of India, Dewdanr had a total population of 12, of which 8 (67%) were males and 4 (33%) were females.

== Civic administration ==
=== Police station ===
Deodanr police station serves the Poraiyahat CD block.
