= Mahagama =

- Census Town
- Location in Jharkhand, India Mahagama (India)
- Coordinates: 25.03°N 87.32°E
- Country: India
- State: Jharkhand
- District: Godda

Area
  - Total: 2.21 km^{2} (0.85 sq mi)
- Elevation: 69 m (226 ft)

Population (2011)
  - Total: 10,969
  - Density: 4,960/km^{2} (12,900/sq mi)

Languages(*For language details see Mahagama (community development block)#Language and religion)
  - Official: Hindi, Urdu, Angika
- Time zone: UTC+5:30 (IST)
- PIN: 814154
- Telephone code: 06437
- Vehicle registration: JH17
- Lok Sabha constituency: Godda
- Vidhan Sabha constituency: Mahagama
- Website: godda.nic.in

Mahagama is a census town in the Mahagama CD block in the Godda subdivision of the Godda district in the Indian state of Jharkhand.

== Urja Nagar ==
Urja Nagar is a major township in the area,developed and maintained by Eastern Coalfields Limited (ECL).The planned residential colony comprises more than 1,441 housing units and includes facilities such as a hospital, shopping complexes, Rajendra Stadium and D.A.V. Public School. The township also has several playgrounds and sports courts, parks, and three clubs used for meetings, social gatherings and community celebrations. Several temples dedicated to different Hindu deities are also located within the township.

== Nearby cities and towns ==
The following is a list of nearby places:

 West

- Pararia (9.5 nm)
- Dhuraia (10.4 nm)
- Panjwara (15.5 nm)
- Laurhia Khurd (17.5 nm)

 North

- Bara (11.3 nm)
- Ekchari (11.4 nm)
- Bhagaiya (13.5 nm)
- Ghoga (13.7 nm)

 East

- Bara Boarijor (9.3 nm)
- Mandro (10.9 nm)
- Borio (14.5 nm)
- Logai (15.7 nm)
- Berhait (18.6 nm)

 South 

- Pathargama (5.7 nm)
- Rajabhita (6.3 nm)
- Godda (13.2 nm)
- Sundarpahar (17.1 nm)
- Dhamni (17.5 nm)
- Jordiha (19.7 nm)

== Geography ==
Cities, towns and locations in the Sahibganj, Godda and Pakur districts in Santhal Pargana Division
M: municipality, CT: census town, R: rural/ urban centre, H: historical/ religious/ tourist centre
Owing to space constraints in the small map, the actual locations in a larger map may vary slightly

=== Location ===
Mahagama is located at 25.03°N 87.32°E. The average elevation is 69 m (226 ft) above sea level. Mahagama is surrounded by hilly areas, with Kaleshari mountain on the east side of town. Laterite soil and red soil are the types of soil found in this block.

Mahagama and Mohanpur together form a twin town within Mahagama block and are therefore a major economic center of the district. The Mahagama township is full planned and all the amenities can be seen here. Mahagama is located 25.88 km from Godda, the main city in Godda district, and 278 km from the state capital Ranchi.

Mahagama has an area of 2.21 square kilometres (0.85 sq mi).

=== Overview ===
The map shows a hilly area with the Rajmahal hills running from the bank of the Ganges in the extreme north to the south, beyond the area covered by the map into Dumka district. ‘Farakka’ is marked on the map and that is where Farakka Barrage is, just inside West Bengal. Rajmahal coalfield is shown in the map. The entire area is overwhelmingly rural with only small pockets of urbanisation.

Note: The full screen map provides links to pages about marked locations, allowing users to navigate between them. Enlarging the map reveals additional geographical features, including railway lines and road connections.

== Members of Assembly ==
- 2000: (Ashok Kumar), Bharatiya Janata Party
- 2005: Ashok Kumar, Bharatiya Janata Party
- 2009: Rajesh Ranjan, Indian National Congress
- 2014: Ashok Kumar, Bharatiya Janata Party
- 2019: Dipika Pandey Singh, Indian National Congress
- 2024: Dipika Pandey Singh, Indian National Congress

== Climate ==
Mahagama experiences a hot dry summer, a good rainy season and a cool winter. Thunderstorms accompanied with severe squalls occur in pre-monsoon months. Average daytime highs are in the mid 80s°F to low 90s°F (around 30–32 °C) throughout the state in July, with overnight lows in the mid 60s°F to low 70s°F (20–22 °C). Dust storms occur occasionally in April and May. Morning fogs are seen in winter season.

== Demographics ==
According to the 2011 Census of India, Mahagama had a total population of 10,969, of which 5,771 (53%) were males and 5,198 (47%) were females. Population in the age range 0–6 years was 1,834. The total number of literate persons in Mahagama was 7,268 (79.56% of the population over 6 years).

== Infrastructure ==
According to the District Census Handbook 2011, Godda, Mahagama covered an area of 2.21 km^{2}. Among the civic amenities, it had 15 km roads with both open and closed drains, the protected water supply involved hand pump, uncovered well, overhead tank. It had 1,451 domestic electric connections, 42 road light points. Among the educational facilities it had 2 primary schools, 2 middle schools, 2 secondary schools, 1 non-formal education centre (Sarva Shiksha Abhiyan). Among the social, cultural and recreational facilities, it had 1 auditorium/ community hall. It had the branch offices of 3 nationalised banks, 1 cooperative bank.

== Civic administration ==
=== Police station ===
Mahagama police station serves Mahagama CD block.

=== CD block HQ ===
Headquarters of Mahagama CD block is at Mahagama town.

== Development ==
The establishment of the Rajmahal Coal Mining Project in the 1980s triggered the development of Mahagama. Since then it has grown from a small village to a potential town. Basua Chowk and Shopping Complex are the main attraction for shoppers. Multiple hotels and complexes are opening due to growing demand. The town is also the home for the Shree Shyam Seva Trust Foundation, a charity organization that aims at helping poor and needy people of this territory. Land rates and inflation have risen significantly in past years. Several development work (Social cause) have been taken up the Marwari community. Ishwar Das smriti Bhawan (Dhramshala) and Shyam seva Trust are example of such initiatives. These trusts provide services at minimal cost or no cost. Free eye camps and artificial limb distribution camps are frequently organized. The Shyam Mahotsav is also a centre of attraction which is an annual devotional event.

== Education ==
Around 103 primary schools, 20 middle schools, eight secondary schools, one senior secondary school and many private schools are functional in Mahagama block as per census 2001. Little flower school is very old school and very reputed school in Mahagama area situated in Basuwa Chowk since 1985. In the last few years, many privately run secondary and higher-secondary schools have opened. Recently, Kasturba Gandhi Balika Vidyalaya (KGBV) opened in the town area to provide elementary level education, with boarding facilities for girls belonging predominantly to the SC, ST, OBC and minorities in backward areas. D.A.V Public School is the most reputed school which is also the best amongst nearby districts. Jawahar Navodaya Vidyalaya is situated in the outer periphery of Mahagama.

Government-run schools are affiliated to Jharkhand Academic Council, while most of the private schools are affiliated to CBSE boards. Some of them are recognized at the state level. One madrasa (Badrul Uloom) is also functional in Mahagama, where underprivileged Muslim children get education free of cost.

There are many Computer Institutes functional in Mahagama Block. IACT (Institute for Advance Computer Technology) is the most reputed computer Institute in Teacher's colony, Mahagama. IT Zone website developing and Hosting centre deals in Website making of all school, college and other institute and company since last 4 years, situated in main road mahagama, near Kachwa Chowk.

== Transport ==
The town has frequent connections with Godda, Bhagalpur, Kahalgaon and Pirpanti. Public transport is provided by buses, auto rickshaws and local vans. Bus services are also available for Sahibganj, Dumka, Tata, Kolkata, Deoghar and Ranchi. The territory has no rail link and air link. Helipad can be seen in the Urjanagar township of Mahagama. The nearest railway station is Godda Railway Station & Bhagalpur Railway Station.

.

Bhagalpur railway stations serve as the primary gateway for travel to other parts of country. While Godda Railway Station is improving day per day. Many long route train for many big cities are starting from Godda railway station. In Coming days, it will the main hub for catch train.

== Sports and lifestyle ==
Cricket is the most popular sport in Mahagama. People can be seen playing cricket on the streets. Football, Kabaddi, and badminton are some other popular sports played in this region. Rajendra Stadium is situated in the heart of Urjanagar town. Football Game is also most spiritual game in Urjanagar played by Santhals United Club, established in 2008. This stadium has been hosting many state level games and other sport events.

Durga Puja and Chhat Puja are two major Parvas celebrated in this region. People from distant places come to worship and enjoy puja season as well as fair organized in Mela Maidan. At the end of Durga Puja that is, during Dusshera, Ravan Dahan program celebrated in the campus of Rajendra Stadium Urjanagar. Many people from nearby villages and towns also enjoy this festive with citizen also.

== See also ==
- Vidhan Sabha
- List of states of India by type of legislature
- Mahagama (community development block)
