= Motia =

- Village
- Location in Jharkhand, India Motia (India)
- Coordinates: 24.8295°N 87.1308°E
- Country: India
- State: Jharkhand
- District: Godda

Population (2011)
  - Total: 4,746

Languages (*For language details see Godda (community development block)#Language and religion)
  - Official: Hindi, Urdu
- Time zone: UTC+5:30 (IST)
- PIN: 814133
- Telephone/ STD code: 06422
- Lok Sabha constituency: Godda
- Vidhan Sabha constituency: Godda
- Website: godda.nic.in

Motia is a village in Godda CD block in Godda subdivision of Godda district in the Indian state of Jharkhand.

== Geography ==
Cities, towns and locations in the Sahibganj, Godda and Pakur districts in Santhal Pargana Division
M: municipality, CT: census town, R: rural/ urban centre, H: historical/ religious/ tourist centre
Owing to space constraints in the small map, the actual locations in a larger map may vary slightly

=== Location ===
Motia is located at 24.8295°N 87.1308°E.

Motia has an area of 526.49 hectares (1,301.0 acres).

=== Overview ===
The map shows a hilly area with the Rajmahal hills running from the bank of the Ganges in the north to the south, beyond the area covered by the map into Dumka district. ‘Farakka’ is marked on the map and that is where Farakka Barrage is, just inside West Bengal. Rajmahal coalfield is shown in the map. The entire area is overwhelmingly rural with only small pockets of urbanisation.

Note: The full-screen map is interactive. Each location is linked to another article. Enlarge the map to see in more detail.

== Demographics ==
According to the 2011 Census of India, Motia had a total population of 4,746, of which 2,413 (51%) were males and 2,333 (49%) were females. Population in the age range 0–6 years was 858. The total number of literate persons in Motia was 2,521 (64.84% of the population over 6 years).

== Economy ==
Adani Power is building a 1,600 MW thermal power plant spread across Motia, Gangta, Gayghat and other adjacent villages in Godda and Poraiyahat CD blocks. It is expected to be operational by 2022. As per a memorandum of understanding signed with Bangladesh Power Development Board, in 2016, Adanis will export the entire power generated to Bangladesh. Adanis would import coal from their Carmichael coal mine in Australia and the coal would come via Dhamra Port owned by Adani Ports & SEZ 700 km away in Odisha. In 2019, it became the first stand-alone power project to secure the status of Special economic zone. Raghubar Das, then Chief Minister of Jharkhand, felt that the Adani power plant at Godda will usher in development and progress in the tribal-domainated area. However, it is facing opposition locally for land acqusution.

== Education ==
Government High School Motiya is a Hindi-medium coeducational institution established in 1954. It has facilities for teaching in classes IX and X.

Nirmaya Rameshwar Girls High School Motia is a Hindi-medium girls only institution established in 1981. It has facilities for teaching in classes IX and X.
