= Sunderpahari, Godda =

Sunderpahari
- Village
- Location in Jharkhand, India Sunderpahari (India)
- Coordinates: 24.755056°N 87.362111°E
- Country: India
- State: Jharkhand
- District: Godda

Population (2011)
  - Total: 888

Languages (*For language details see Sunderpahari#Language and religion)
  - Official: Hindi, Urdu
- Time zone: UTC+5:30 (IST)
- PIN: 814156
- Telephone/ STD code: 06422
- Lok Sabha constituency: Godda
- Vidhan Sabha constituency: Godda
- Website: godda.nic.in

Sunderpahari (also spelled as Sundarpahari) is a village in the Sunderpahari CD block in the Godda subdivision of the Godda district in the Indian state of Jharkhand.

== Geography ==
Cities, towns and locations in the Sahibganj, Godda and Pakur districts in Santhal Pargana Division
M: municipality, CT: census town, R: rural/ urban centre, H: historical/ religious/ tourist centre
Owing to space constraints in the small map, the actual locations in a larger map may vary slightly

=== Location ===
Sunderpahari is located at 24.755056°N 87.362111°E.

Sundarpahari has an area of 451 hectares (1,110 acres).

=== Overview ===
The map shows a hilly area with the Rajmahal hills running from the bank of the Ganges in the extreme north to the south, beyond the area covered by the map into Dumka district. ‘Farakka’ is marked on the map and that is where Farakka Barrage is, just inside West Bengal. Rajmahal coalfield is shown in the map. The entire area is overwhelmingly rural with only small pockets of urbanisation.

Note: The full screen map is interactive. All places marked on the map are linked, and you can select and move on to another page of your choice. Enlarge the map to see what else is there – one gets railway links, many more road links and so on.

== Demographics ==
According to the 2011 Census of India, Sunderpahari had a total population of 888, of which 366 (41%) were males and 522 (59%) were females. Population in the age range 0–6 years was 130. The total number of literate persons in Sunderpahari was 447 (58.97% of the population over 6 years).

== Civic administration ==
=== Police station ===
Sunderpahari police station serves the Sunderpahari CD block.

=== CD block HQ ===
Headquarters of Sunderpahari CD block is at Sunderpahari village.

== Economy ==
Jindal Steel and Power had planned for a 2 X 660 MW captive power plant at Nipania (near Sunderpahari) for their upcoming steel plants at Patratu and Asanboni, both in Jharkhand. In spite of the ground-breaking ceremony having been presided over by Pranab Mukherjee, President of India, in April 2013, as of 2020 the project has made no progress except for some land acquisition. Jitapur coal block, located 10 km from the project site and having a reserve of 65 million tonnes of coal, was initially earmarked for the power plant but was later allotted to Adani Power. Efforts are being made to get the project going or return of the acquired land.

== Education ==
Sunderpahari High School is a Hindi-medium coeducational (?) institution. It has facilities for teaching from class I to class XII.

Kasturba Gandhi Balika Vidyalaya is a Hindi-medium girls only institution. It has facilities for teaching from class VI to class XII.

Sunderpahari Project High School is a Hindi-medium girls only institution. It has facilities for teaching in classes IX and X.

Government Model School is an English-medium coeducational institution. It has facilities for teaching from class VI to class X.
