= Poraiyahat =

Poraiyahat Poreyahat
- Town
- Location in Jharkhand, India
- Coordinates: 24°40′41″N 87°10′19″E
- Country: India
- State: Jharkhand
- District: Godda
- Elevation: 145 m (476 ft)

Population (2011)
  - Total: 6,319

Languages (*For language details see Poraiyahat (community development block)#Language and religion)
  - Official: Hindi, Urdu
- Time zone: UTC+5:30 (IST)
- PIN: 814153 (Poraiyahat)
- Telephone/STD code: 06422
- Lok Sabha constituency: Godda
- Vidhan Sabha constituency: Poreyahat
- Website: godda.nic.in

Poraiyahat is a town in the Poraiyahat community division block in the Godda district of Jharkhand, India.

== Geography ==
Cities, towns and locations in the Sahibganj, Godda and Pakur districts in Santhal Pargana Division
M: municipality, CT: census town, R: rural/ urban centre, H: historical/ religious/ tourist centre
Owing to space constraints in the small map, the actual locations in a larger map may vary slightly

=== Location ===
Poraiyahat is a town located on the north-east border of Bihar and Jharkhand.

Poraiyahat has an area of 487 hectares (1,200 acres).

=== Overview ===
The Rajmahal hills run from the bank of the Ganges in the extreme north to the south into the Dumka district. The entire area is mostly rural, with only small pockets of urbanisation.

== Demographics ==
According to the 2011 Census of India, Poraiyahat had a total population of 6,319, of which 3,296 (52%) were males and 3,023 (48%) were females. 876 people were in the age range 0–6 years. The total number of literate persons in Poraiyahat was 4,106 (75.44% of the population over six years).

== Transport ==
The Deoghar-Godda-Pirpainti NH 133 passes through Poraiyahat, and connects to the Farakka-Arwal NH 33 at Pirpainti.

The 30 km Hansdiha-Godda rail, part of the Eastern Railway, passes through Poraiyahat.
