= Lalmatia (disambiguation) =

Lalmatia refers to a neighbourhood in Dhaka, Bangladesh.

It also refers to:

- Lalmatia, Godda, a village in Jharkhand, India
- Lalmatia Colliery, in Godda district, Jharkhand, India
