= Rajabi =

Rajabi or Radjabi is a given name and a surname. Notable people with the name include:

Surname:

- Abdolreza Rajabi (1962–2008), Kurdish Iranian who died under suspicious circumstances in Reja'i Shahr Prison
- Atafeh Rajabi (1987–2004), Iranian girl, executed on charges of adultery and crimes against chastity
- Leila Rajabi (born 1983), naturalized Iranian shot putter of Belarusian origin
- Mehran Rajabi (born 1961), Iranian actor
- Mohammad Reza Rajabi (born 1986), Iranian handball player
- Saeid Rajabi (futsal) (born 1965), Iranian football coach, former football and futsal player
- Saeid Rajabi (taekwondo) (born 1996), Iranian heavyweight taekwondo competitor

Given name:

- Rajabi Eslami (born 1937), Iranian weightlifter

== See also ==
- Rajabi Tower, clock tower in South Mumbai India
- Rajab
- Rajabhita
