= Poraiyahat (community development block) =

- Community development block
- Poraiyahat
- Coordinates: 24°40′41″N 87°10′19″E
- Country: India
- State: Jharkhand
- District: Godda

Government
  - Type: Federal democracy

Area
  - Total: 470.03 km^{2} (181.48 sq mi)
- Elevation: 145 m (476 ft)

Population (2011)
  - Total: 187,489
  - Density: 398.89/km^{2} (1,033.1/sq mi)

Languages
  - Official: Hindi, Urdu

Literacy (2011)
  - Total literates: 87,791 (56.33%)
- Time zone: UTC+5:30 (IST)
- PIN: 814153 (Poraiyahat)
- Telephone/STD code: 06422
- Vehicle registration: JH 17
- Lok Sabha constituency: Godda
- Vidhan Sabha constituency: Poreyahat
- Website: godda.nic.in

Poraiyahat (also spelled Poreyahat, Pareyahat or simply Poreya) is a community development block that forms an administrative division in the Godda subdivision of the Godda district, Jharkhand state, India.

== Geography ==
Poraiyahat, the eponymous CD block headquarters, is located at 24.680056°N 87.179544°E.

It is located 15 km from Godda, the district headquarters.

Godda district is a plateau region with undulating uplands, long ridges and depressions. The western portion of the Rajmahal hills passes through the district. The plain areas have lost its once rich forests but the hills still retain some. Kajhia, Sunder and Sakri rivers flow through the district.

Poraiyahat CD block is bounded by Godda CD block on the north, Sunderpahari CD block on the east, Ramgarh and Saraiyahat CD blocks in Dumka district on the south, and Bausi CD block in Banka district of Bihar on the west.

Poraiyahat CD block has an area of 470.03 km^{2}.Poraiyahat and Deodanr police stations serve this block. Headquarters of this CD block is at Poraiyahat village.

== Demographics ==
=== Population ===
According to the 2011 Census of India, Poraiyahat CD block had a total population of 187,489, all of which were rural. There were 95,814 (51%) males and 91,675 (49%) females. Population in the age range 0–6 years was 31,648. Scheduled Castes numbered 12,347 (6.59%) and Scheduled Tribes numbered 59,481 (31.73%).

In the 2011 census, Poraiyahat (village) had a population of 6,319.

=== Literacy ===
According to the 2011 census the total number of literate persons in Poreyahat CD block was 87,791 (56.33% of the population over 6 years) out of which 55,229 (63%) were males and 35,562 (37%) were females. The gender disparity (the difference between female and male literacy rates) was 26%.

See also – List of Jharkhand districts ranked by literacy rate

Literacy in CD Blocks of
Godda district
Meharama – 55.99%
Thakurgangti – 56.64%
Boarijore – 45.68%
Mahagama – 55.66%
Pathargama – 61.31%
Basantrai – 56.60%
Godda – 59.58%
Poraiyahat – 56.33%
Sunderpahari – 43.62%
Source: 2011 Census: CD Block Wise
Primary Census Abstract Data

=== Language and religion ===
Religions in Poreyahat block (2011)
Religion	Percent
Hinduism	80.69%
Islam	8.39%
Christianity	6.14%
Sarna	4.53%
Other or not stated	0.25%

Languages of Poreyahat block (2011)
1. 'Other' Hindi (37.2%)
2. Santali (30.2%)
3. Khortha (23.0%)
4. Bengali (3.80%)
5. Hindi (2.60%)
6. Bhojpuri (1.88%)
7. Others (1.38%)

At the time of the 2011 census, 30.17% of the population spoke Santali, 22.98% Khortha, 3.80% Bengali, 2.60% Hindi and 1.88% Bhojpuri as their first language. 37.19% of the population recorded their language as 'Others' under Hindi as their first language.

== Rural poverty ==
40-50% of the population of Godda district were in the BPL category in 2004–2005, being in the same category as Giridih, Koderma and Hazaribagh districts. Rural poverty in Jharkhand declined from 66% in 1993–94 to 46% in 2004–05. In 2011, it has come down to 39.1%.

== Economy ==
=== Livelihood ===
Livelihood
in Poraiyahat CD block
1. Cultivators (32.3%)
2. Agricultural labourers (55.2%)
3. Household industries (2.13%)
4. Other Workers (10.3%)

In Poraiyahat CD block in 2011, amongst the class of total workers, cultivators numbered 26,289 and formed 32.32%, agricultural labourers numbered 44,889 and formed 55.19%, household industry workers numbered 1,735 and formed 2.13% and other workers numbered 8,421 and formed 10.35%. Total workers numbered 81,334 and formed 43.38% of the total population. Non-workers numbered 106,155 and formed 56.62% of total population.

Note: In the census records a person is considered a cultivator, if the person is engaged in cultivation/ supervision of land owned. When a person who works on another person's land for wages in cash or kind or share, is regarded as an agricultural labourer. Household industry is defined as an industry conducted by one or more members of the family within the household or village, and one that does not qualify for registration as a factory under the Factories Act. Other workers are persons engaged in some economic activity other than cultivators, agricultural labourers and household workers. It includes factory, mining, plantation, transport and office workers, those engaged in business and commerce, teachers and entertainment artistes.

=== Infrastructure ===
There are 197 inhabited villages in Poraiyahat CD block. In 2011, 64 villages had power supply. 12 villages had tap water (treated/ untreated), 164 villages had well water (covered/ uncovered), 172 villages had hand pumps, and 16 villages did not have drinking water facility. 10 villages had post offices, 26 villages had sub post offices, 15 villages had telephones (land lines), 19 villages had public call offices and 77 villages had mobile phone coverage. 180 villages had pucca (paved) village roads, 36 villages had bus service (public/ private), 19 villages had autos/ modified autos, 18 villages had taxis/ vans, 67 villages had tractors, 8 villages had navigable waterways. 8 villages had bank branches, 4 village had ATMs, 3 villages had agricultural credit societies, 16 villages had cinema/ video halls, 17 villages had public libraries, public reading room. 75 villages had public distribution system, 43 villages had weekly haat (market) and 100 villages had assembly polling stations.

=== Agriculture ===
Around 80% of the population depends on agriculture, the main economic activity of the district but lack of irrigation facilities is a major constraint in raising the existing low levels of productivity. A sizable population is also engaged in animal husbandry and cottage industries. The livelihood scenario presented above indicates that a large population depends on agriculture. In Poraiyahat CD block 48.43% of the total area is cultivable area and 31.98% of the cultivable area is irrigated area.

=== Power plant ===
Adani Power is building a 1,600 MW thermal power plant spread across Motia, Gangta, Gayghat and other adjacent villages in Godda and Poraiyahat CD blocks. It is expected to be operational by 2022.

=== Backward Regions Grant Fund ===
Godda district is listed as a backward region and receives financial support from the Backward Regions Grant Fund. The fund created by the Government of India is designed to redress regional imbalances in development. As of 2012, 272 districts across the country were listed under this scheme. The list includes 21 districts of Jharkhand.

== Education ==
Poraiyahat CD block had 45 villages with pre-primary schools, 163 villages with primary schools, 80 villages with middle schools, 19 villages with secondary schools, 8 villages with senior secondary schools, 6 villages with vocational training school/ ITI, 1 village with non-formal training centre, 31 villages with no educational facility.
.*Senior secondary schools are also known as Inter colleges in Jharkhand

== Healthcare ==
Poraiyahat CD block had 10 villages with primary health centres, 17 villages with primary health subcentres, 8 villages with maternity and child welfare centres, 3 villages with TB clinics, 6 villages with allopathic hospitals, 8 villages with dispensaries, 2 villages with veterinary hospitals, 4 villages with family welfare centres, 5 villages with medicine shops.
.*Private medical practitioners, alternative medicine etc. not included
