= Pathargama, Godda =

Pathargama
- Village
- Location in Jharkhand, India Pathargama (India)
- Coordinates: 24.9457°N 87.2772°E
- Country: India
- State: Jharkhand
- District: Godda

Population (2011)
  - Total: 3,490

Languages (*For language details see Pathargama#Language and religion)
  - Official: Hindi, Urdu
- Time zone: UTC+5:30 (IST)
- PIN: 814147
- Telephone/ STD code: 06437
- Lok Sabha constituency: Godda
- Vidhan Sabha constituency: Godda
- Website: godda.nic.in

Pathargama is a village in the Pathargama CD block in the Godda subdivision of the Godda district in the Indian state of Jharkhand.

== Geography ==
Cities, towns and locations in the Sahibganj, Godda and Pakur districts in Santhal Pargana Division
M: municipality, CT: census town, R: rural/ urban centre, H: historical/ religious/ tourist centre
Owing to space constraints in the small map, the actual locations in a larger map may vary slightly

=== Location ===
Pathargama is located at 24.9457°N 87.2772°E.

Pathargama has an area of 62 hectares (150 acres).

=== Overview ===
The map displays the area surrounding Pathargama, including the Rajmahal hillswhich run from the bank of the Ganges in the north to the south, extending beyond the edge of the map into the Dumka district. The area is rural with small pockets of urbanization.

Note: The map has additional functionality when expanded to full-size (e.g., each location marked on the map is linked to the related Wiki, expanded coverage of transportation infrastructure).

== Demographics ==
According to the 2011 Census of India, Pathargama had a total population of 3,490, of which 1,818 (52%) were males and 1,672 (48%) were females. Population in the age range 0–6 years was 576. The total number of literate persons in Pathargama was 2,249 (77.18% of the population over 6 years).

== Civic administration ==
=== Police station ===
Pathargama police station serves the Pathargama block.

=== CD block HQ ===
Headquarters of Pathargama CD block is at Pathargma village.

== Education ==
SBSSPSJ College was established at Pathargama in 1980. It is affiliated with Sido Kanhu Murmu University. It offers both honours and general courses in arts, science and commerce. and has coeducational facilities for classes XI and XII.

NG High School Pathargama is a Hindi-medium coeducational institution established in 1947. It has facilities for teaching from class IX to class XII.

Mahila College Pathargama is a Hindi-medium girls only institution established in 1989. It has facilities for teaching in classes XI and XII.

Government Girls High School Pathargama is a Hindi-medium girls only institution established in 1979. It has facilities for teaching in classes IX and X.

Kasturba Gandhi Balika Vidyalaya Pathargama is a Hindi-medium girls only school established in 2006. It has facilities for teaching from class VI to class XII.
