= Sarotia =

Sarotia is a village in Godda district of Jharkhand state of India.
