= Boarijore =

Boarijore Boarijor
- Community development block
- Coordinates: 25°3′41.8″N 87°28′32.6″E
- Country: India
- State: Jharkhand
- District: Godda

Government
  - Type: Federal democracy

Area
  - Total: 396.98 km^{2} (153.27 sq mi)
- Elevation: 38 m (125 ft)

Population (2011)
  - Total: 138,330
  - Density: 348.46/km^{2} (902.50/sq mi)

Languages
  - Official: Hindi, Urdu

Literacy (2011)
  - Total literates: 51,609 (45.68%)
- Time zone: UTC+5:30 (IST)
- PIN: 814147 (Pathergama); 814165 (Lalmatia Colliery)
- Telephone/STD code: 06437
- Vehicle registration: JH 17
- Lok Sabha constituency: Godda
- Vidhan Sabha constituency: Mahagama
- Website: godda.nic.in

Boarijore (also spelled Boarijor) is a CD block that forms an administrative division in the Godda subdivision of the Godda district, Jharkhand state, India.

== Geography ==
Bara Boarijore, the CD Block headquarters, is located at 25°3′41.8″N 87°28′32.6″E.

Boarijore is located 43 km (26.7 mi) from Godda, the district headquarters.

Godda district is a plateau region with undulating uplands, long ridges and depressions. The western portion of the Rajmahal hills passes through the district. The plain areas have lost their once-rich forests but the hills still retain some. The Kajhia, Sunder and Sakri rivers flow through the district.

The Rajmahal hills cover most of the Boarijore and Sunderpahari CD blocks in Godda district.

Boarijore CD block is bounded by Meharama and Thakurgangti CD blocks on the north, Mandro, Borio and Barhait CD blocks in Sahibganj district on the east, Sunderpahari CD block on the south, and Pathargama, Mahagama and Meharama CD blocks on the west.

Boarijore CD block has an area of 396.98 km^{2} (153.27 sq mi).Boarijore and Lalmatia police stations serve this block. Headquarters of this CD block is at Boarijore village.

== Demographics ==
=== Population ===
According to the 2011 Census of India, Boarijore CD block had a total population of 138,330, all of it rural. There were 70,106 (51%) males and 68,224 (49%) females. Population in the age range 0–6 years was 25,352. Scheduled Castes numbered 4,409 (3.19%) and Scheduled Tribes numbered 76,935 (55.62%).

In 2011 census, Bara Boarijor (village) had a population of 2,423 and Chota Boarijor (village) had 295 persons.

=== Literacy ===
According to the 2011 census, the total number of literates in Boarijor CD block was 51,609 (45.68% of the population over 6 years) out of which 32,949 (64%) were males and 18,660 (36%) were females. The gender disparity (the difference between female and male literacy rates) was 28%.

See also – List of Jharkhand districts ranked by literacy rate

Literacy in CD Blocks of
Godda district
Meharama – 55.99%
Thakurgangti – 56.64%
Boarijore – 45.68%
Mahagama – 55.66%
Pathargama – 61.31%
Basantrai – 56.60%
Godda – 59.58%
Poraiyahat – 56.33%
Sunderpahari – 43.62%
Source: 2011 Census: CD Block Wise
Primary Census Abstract Data

=== Language and religion ===
Religions in Boarijor block (2011)
Religion	Percent
Hinduism	58.94%
Islam	17.48%
Sarna	16.81%
Christianity	6.42%
Other or not stated	0.35%

Languages of Boarijor block (2011)
1. Santali (45.3%)
2. Khortha (12.6%)
3. Malto (8.31%)
4. 'Other' Hindi (7.77%)
5. Urdu (7.71%)
6. Kurmali (6.11%)
7. Bengali (5.64%)
8. Bhojpuri (3.81%)
9. Hindi (1.63%)
10. Others (1.10%)

At the time of the 2011 census, 45.28% of the population spoke Santali, 12.64% Khortha, 8.31% Malto, 7.71% Urdu, 6.11% Kurmali, 5.64% Bengali, 3.81% Bhojpuri and 1.63% Hindi as their first language. 7.77% of the population recorded their language as 'Others' under Hindi as their first language.

== Rural poverty ==
40-50% of the population of Godda district were in the BPL category in 2004–2005, being in the same category as Giridih, Koderma and Hazaribagh districts. Rural poverty in Jharkhand declined from 66% in 1993–94 to 46% in 2004–05. In 2011, it has come down to 39.1%.

== Economy ==
=== Livelihood ===
Livelihood
in Boarijore CD block
1. Cultivators (28.5%)
2. Agricultural labourers (56.2%)
3. Household industries (2.71%)
4. Other Workers (12.6%)

In Boarijore CD block in 2011, amongst the class of total workers, cultivators numbered 18,675 and formed 28.54%, agricultural labourers numbered 36,753 and formed 56.16%, household industry workers numbered 1,771 and formed 2.71% and other workers numbered 8,244 and formed 12.60%. Total workers numbered 65,443 and formed 47.31% of the total population. Non-workers numbered 72,887 and formed 52.69% of total population.

Note: In the census records a person is considered a cultivator, if the person is engaged in cultivation/ supervision of land owned. When a person who works on another person's land for wages in cash or kind or share, is regarded as an agricultural labourer. Household industry is defined as an industry conducted by one or more members of the family within the household or village, and one that does not qualify for registration as a factory under the Factories Act. Other workers are persons engaged in some economic activity other than cultivators, agricultural labourers and household workers. It includes factory, mining, plantation, transport and office workers, those engaged in business and commerce, teachers and entertainment artistes.

=== Infrastructure ===
There are 309 inhabited villages in Boarijore CD block. In 2011, 25 villages had power supply. 8 villages had tap water (treated/ untreated), 268 villages had well water (covered/ uncovered), 190 villages had hand pumps, and 22 villages did not have drinking water facility. 15 villages had post offices, 18 villages had sub post offices, 10 villages had telephones (land lines), 13 villages had public call offices and 140 villages had mobile phone coverage. 253 villages had pucca (paved) village roads, 31 villages had bus service (public/ private), 8 villages had autos/ modified autos, 14 villages had taxis/ vans, 65 villages had tractors, 7 villages had navigable waterways. 8 villages had bank branches, 2 villages had ATMs, 4 villages had agricultural credit societies, 48 villages had cinema/ video halls, 46 villages had public libraries, public reading room. 105 villages had public distribution system, 76 villages had weekly haat (market) and 134 villages had assembly polling stations.

=== Coal mining ===
Godda district is rich in coal. A major coal mining project of Eastern Coalfields Limited (Rajmahal open cast project, a part of Rajmahal coalfield) is going on in Boarijore, Mahagama and Sunderpahari CD blocks.

The Rajmahal Opencast project came up in the early 1980s with an annual cpapcity of 5 million tonnes. The capacity was raised to 10.5 million tonnes with Canadian collaboration in 1994. The capacity is being expanded to 17 million tonnes.

EMIL the mining arm of the Aditya Birla Group has been involved in the functioning of Rajmahal Opencast Mines of Eastern Coalfields. Mining operations started in July 2013. It is expected to produce 200 million tonnes of coal over 12.5 years. With the involvement of the Essel Mining and Industries Limited (EMIL) in the Rajmahal Opencast project, supplies to the 2,340 MW Kahalgaon Super Thermal Power Station and the 2,100 MW Farakka Super Thermal Power Station of NTPC were expected to improve. In the Boarijore CD block, major activity is going on near Lalmatia village. Please see satellite view of the Google map.

=== Agriculture ===
Around 80% of the population depends on agriculture, the main economic activity of the district but lack of irrigation facilities is a major constraint in raising the existing low levels of productivity. A sizable population is also engaged in animal husbandry and cottage industries. The livelihood scenario presented above indicates that a large population depends on agriculture. In Boarijore CD block 49.32% of the total area is cultivable area and 8.71% of the cultivable area is irrigated area.

=== Backward Regions Grant Fund ===
Godda district is listed as a backward region and receives financial support from the Backward Regions Grant Fund. The fund created by the Government of India is designed to redress regional imbalances in development. As of 2012, 272 districts across the country were listed under this scheme. The list includes 21 districts of Jharkhand.

== Education ==
Boarijore CD block had 20 villages with pre-primary schools, 183 villages with primary schools, 79 villages with middle schools, 12 villages with secondary schools, 2 villages with senior secondary schools, 2 vocational training schools/ ITI, 1 village with non-formal training centre, 125 villages with no educational facility.
.*Senior secondary schools are also known as Inter colleges in Jharkhand

== Healthcare ==
Boarijore CD block had 8 villages with primary health centres, 16 villages with primary health subcentres, 10 village with maternity and child welfare centre, 3 villages with allopathic hospitals, 4 villages with dispensaries, 1 village with family welfare centre, 18 villages with medicine shops.
.*Private medical practitioners, alternative medicine etc. not included
