= Thakurgangti =

- Community development block
- Coordinates: 25°7′45″N 87°27′13″E
- Country: India
- State: Jharkhand
- District: Godda

Government
  - Type: Federal democracy

Area
  - Total: 84.71 km^{2} (32.71 sq mi)
- Elevation: 38 m (125 ft)

Population (2011)
  - Total: 99,603
  - Density: 1,176/km^{2} (3,045/sq mi)

Languages
  - Official: Hindi, Urdu

Literacy (2011)
  - Total literates: 45,665 (56.64%)
- Time zone: UTC+5:30 (IST)
- PIN: 813208 (Mirzachowki); 814154 (Mahagama)
- Telephone/STD code: 06437
- Vehicle registration: JH 17
- Lok Sabha constituency: Godda
- Vidhan Sabha constituency: Mahagama
- Website: godda.nic.in

Thakurgangti is a community development block that forms an administrative division in Godda subdivision of the Godda district, Jharkhand state, India.

== History ==
Rameshwar Thakur, independence activist, former Union Minister and Governor of several states, was born at Thakurgangti.

== Geography ==
Thakurgangti, the eponymous CD block headquarters, is located at 25°7′45″N 87°27′13″E.

It is located 48 km from Godda, the district headquarters.

Godda district is a plateau region with undulating uplands, long ridges and depressions. The western portion of the Rajmahal hills passes through the district. The plain areas have lost its once rich forests but the hills still retain some. Kajhia, Sunder and Sakri rivers flow through the district.

Thakurgangti CD block is bounded by Pirpainti CD block in Bhagalpur district of Bihar on the north, Mandro CD block in Sahibganj district on the east, Boarijor CD block on the south and Meharama CD block on the west.

Thakurgangti CD block has an area of 84.71 km^{2}. Thakurgangti police station serves this block. Headquarters of this CD block is at Thakurgangti village.

== Demographics ==
=== Population ===
According to the 2011 Census of India, Thakurgangti CD block had a total population of 99,603, all of which were rural. There were 51,822 (52%) males and 47,781 (48%) females. Population in the age range 0–6 years was 18,978. Scheduled Castes numbered 8,159 (8.19%) and Scheduled Tribes numbered 13,304 (13.36%).

=== Literacy ===
According to the 2011 census, the total number of literates in Thakurgangti CD block was 45,665 (56.64% of the population over 6 years) out of which 28,495 (62%) were males and 17,170 (38%) were females. The gender disparity (the difference between female and male literacy rates) was 24%.

See also – List of Jharkhand districts ranked by literacy rate

Literacy in CD Blocks of
Godda district
Meharama – 55.99%
Thakurgangti – 56.64%
Boarijore – 45.68%
Mahagama – 55.66%
Pathargama – 61.31%
Basantrai – 56.60%
Godda – 59.58%
Poraiyahat – 56.33%
Sunderpahari – 43.62%
Source: 2011 Census: CD Block Wise
Primary Census Abstract Data

=== Language and religion ===
Religions in Thakurgangti block (2011)
Religion	Percent
Hinduism	72.67%
Islam	24.35%
Christianity	1.67%
Sarna	1.21%
Other or not stated	0.10%

Languages of Thakurgangti block (2011)
1. 'Other' Hindi (56.1%)
2. Santali (11.4%)
3. Kurmali (9.21%)
4. Urdu (5.07%)
5. Bengali (4.60%)
6. 'Other' Gujarati (4.16%)
7. Bhojpuri (2.22%)
8. Hindi (2.11%)
9. Magahi (1.65%)
10. Khortha (1.40%)
11. Kurukh (1.39%)
12. Others (0.67%)

At the time of the 2011 census, 11.37% of the population spoke Santali, 9.21% Kurmali, 5.07% Urdu, 4.60% Bengali, 2.22% Bhojpuri, 2.11% Hindi, 1.65% Magahi, 1.40% Khortha and 1.39% Kurukh as their first language. 56.15% of the population recorded their language as 'Others' under Hindi and 4.16% spoke 'Others' under Gujarati as their first language.

== Rural poverty ==
40-50% of the population of Godda district were in the BPL category in 2004–2005, being in the same category as Giridih, Koderma and Hazaribagh districts. Rural poverty in Jharkhand declined from 66% in 1993–94 to 46% in 2004–05. In 2011, it has come down to 39.1%.

== Economy ==
=== Livelihood ===
Livelihood
in Thakurgangti CD block
1. Cultivators (15.7%)
2. Agricultural labourers (54.1%)
3. Household industries (15.8%)
4. Other Workers (14.4%)

In Thakurgangti CD block in 2011, amongst the class of total workers, cultivators numbered 6,530 and formed 15.69%, agricultural labourers numbered 22,550 and formed 54.12%, household industry workers numbered 6,564 and formed 15.75% and other workers numbered 6,017 and formed 14.44%. Total workers numbered 41,670 and formed 41.84% of the total population. Non-workers numbered 57,933 and formed 50.36% of total population.

Note: In the census records a person is considered a cultivator, if the person is engaged in cultivation/ supervision of land owned. A person who works on another person's land for wages in cash or kind or share, is regarded as an agricultural labourer. Household industry is defined as an industry conducted by one or more members of the family within the household or village, and one that does not qualify for registration as a factory under the Factories Act. Other workers are persons engaged in some economic activity other than cultivators, agricultural labourers and household workers. It includes factory, mining, plantation, transport and office workers, those engaged in business and commerce, teachers and entertainment artistes.

=== Infrastructure ===
There are 146 inhabited villages in Thakurgangti CD block. In 2011, 29 villages had power supply. 133 villages had well water (covered/ uncovered), 107 villages had hand pumps, and all villages had drinking water facility. 11 villages had post offices, 18 villages had sub post offices, 15 villages had telephones (land lines), 2 villages had public call offices and 67 villages had mobile phone coverage. 109 villages had pucca (paved) village roads, 40 villages had bus service (public/ private), 9 villages had autos/ modified autos, 10 villages had taxis/ vans and 22 villages had tractors, 1 village had navigable waterway. 4 villages had bank branches, 36 villages had cinema/ video halls, 40 villages had public libraries, public reading room. 71 villages had public distribution system, 58 villages had weekly haat (market) and 103 villages had assembly polling stations.

=== Agriculture ===
Around 80% of the population depends on agriculture, the main economic activity of the district but lack of irrigation facilities is a major constraint in raising the existing low levels of productivity. A sizable population is also engaged in animal husbandry and cottage industries. The livelihood scenario presented above indicates that a large population depends on agriculture. In Thakurgangti CD block 75.46% of the total area is cultivable area and 15.72% of the cultivable area is irrigated area.

=== Backward Regions Grant Fund ===
Godda district is listed as a backward region and receives financial support from the Backward Regions Grant Fund. The fund created by the Government of India is designed to redress regional imbalances in development. As of 2012, 272 districts across the country were listed under this scheme. The list includes 21 districts of Jharkhand.

== Education ==
Thakurgangti CD block had 50 villages with pre-primary schools, 85 villages with primary schools, 45 villages with middle schools, 5 villages with secondary schools, 1 village with senior secondary school, 1 village with non-formal training centre, 55 villages with no educational facility.
.*Senior secondary schools are also known as Inter colleges in Jharkhand

== Healthcare ==
Thakurgangti CD block had 2 villages with primary health centres, 5 villages with primary health subcentres, 2 villages with dispensaries.
.*Private medical practitioners, alternative medicine etc. not included
