= Rajabhita =

- Village
- Location in Jharkhand, India Rajabhita (India)
- Coordinates: 24.934056°N 87.358431°E
- Country: India
- State: Jharkhand
- District: Godda

Population (2011)
  - Total: 239

Languages (*For language details see Sunderpahari#Language and religion)
  - Official: Hindi, Urdu
- Time zone: UTC+5:30 (IST)
- PIN: 814147
- Telephone/ STD code: 06422
- Lok Sabha constituency: Godda
- Vidhan Sabha constituency: Godda
- Website: godda.nic.in

Rajabhita is a village in the Sunderpahari CD block in the Godda subdivision of the Godda district in the Indian state of Jharkhand.

== Geography ==
Cities, towns and locations in the Sahibganj, Godda and Pakur districts in Santhal Pargana Division
M: municipality, CT: census town, R: rural/ urban centre, H: historical/ religious/ tourist centre
Owing to space constraints in the small map, the actual locations in a larger map may vary slightly

=== Location ===
Rajabhita is located at 24.934056°N 87.358431°E.

Rajabhita has an area of 229.48 hectares (567.1 acres).

=== Overview ===
The map shows a hilly area with the Rajmahal hills running from the bank of the Ganges in the extreme north to the south, beyond the area covered by the map into Dumka district. ‘Farakka’ is marked on the map and that is where Farakka Barrage is, just inside West Bengal. Rajmahal coalfield is shown in the map. The area is overwhelmingly rural with only small pockets of urbanisation.

Note: All places marked on the map are linked to their own articles.

== Demographics ==
According to the 2011 Census of India, Rajabhita had a population of 239, including 118 (49%) males and 121 (51%) females.

== Civic administration ==
=== Police station ===
Rajabhita police station serves the Sunderpahari CD block.

== Tourism ==
Sundar Dam, located nearby, is the largest irrigation project in the district and a beautiful picnic spot. The dam built across the Sundar River in 1970-78 is 75 ft high.
