= Godda (community development block) =

- Community development block
- Coordinates: 24°49′42″N 87°12′15″E
- Country: India
- State: Jharkhand
- District: Godda

Government
  - Type: Federal democracy

Area
  - Total: 353.76 km^{2} (136.59 sq mi)
- Elevation: 145 m (476 ft)

Population (2011)
  - Total: 221,775
  - Density: 626.91/km^{2} (1,623.7/sq mi)

Languages
  - Official: Hindi, Urdu

Literacy (2011)
  - Total literates: 108,866 (59.58%)
- Time zone: UTC+5:30 (IST)
- PIN: 814133 (Godda)
- Telephone/STD code: 06422
- Vehicle registration: JH 17
- Lok Sabha constituency: Godda
- Vidhan Sabha constituency: Godda, Poreyahat
- Website: godda.nic.in

Godda is a community development block that forms an administrative division in the Godda subdivision of the Godda district, Jharkhand state, India.

== Geography ==
Godda, the eponymous CD block headquarters, is located at 24°49′42″N 87°12′15″E.

Godda district is a plateau region with undulating uplands, long ridges and depressions. The western portion of the Rajmahal hills passes through the district. The plain areas have lost its once rich forests but the hills still retain some. Kajhia, Sunder and Sakri rivers flow through the district.

Godda CD block is bounded by Pathargama CD block on the north, Sunderpahari CD block on the east, Poraiyahat CD block on the south, and Dhuraiya and Barahat CD blocks in Banka district of Bihar on the west.

Godda CD block has an area of 353.76 km^{2}. Godda Town and Godda Mufassil police stations serve this block. Headquarters of this CD block is at Godda town.

== Demographics ==
=== Population ===
According to the 2011 Census of India, Godda CD block had a total population of 221,775, of which 216,805 were rural and 4,970. There were 114,911 (52%) males and 106,864 (48%) females. Population in the age range 0–6 years was 39,039. Scheduled Castes numbered 20,418 (9.21%) and Scheduled Tribes numbered 28,617 (12.90%).

In the 2011 census, Sarauni was census town in Godda CD block with a population of 4,970. There were four large villages (2011 population in brackets): Motiya (4,746), Jamuni Paharpur (6,271), Sarkanda (4,012) and Makhni (4,186).

=== Literacy ===
According to the 2011 census, the total number of literate persons in Godda CD block was 108,866 (59.58% of the population over 6 years) out of which 68,028 (62%) were males and 40,838 (38%) were females. The gender disparity (the difference between female and male literacy rates) was 24%.

See also – List of Jharkhand districts ranked by literacy rate

Literacy in CD Blocks of
Godda district
Meharama – 55.99%
Thakurgangti – 56.64%
Boarijore – 45.68%
Mahagama – 55.66%
Pathargama – 61.31%
Basantrai – 56.60%
Godda – 59.58%
Poraiyahat – 56.33%
Sunderpahari – 43.62%
Source: 2011 Census: CD Block Wise
Primary Census Abstract Data

=== Language and religion ===
Religions in Godda block (2011)
Religion	Percent
Hinduism	83.44%
Islam	14.29%
Sarna	1.07%
Christianity	1.03%
Other or not stated	0.17%

Languages of Godda block (2011)
1. 'Other' Hindi (50.0%)
2. Khortha (20.2%)
3. Santali (10.8%)
4. Urdu (4.99%)
5. Hindi (4.80%)
6. Bengali (3.66%)
7. Kurmali (3.05%)
8. Bhojpuri (1.55%)
9. Others (0.97%)

At the time of the 2011 census, 20.16% of the population spoke Khortha, 10.77% Santali, 4.99% Urdu, 4.80% Hindi, 3.66% Bengali, 3.05% Kurmali and 1.55% Bhojpuri as their first language. 50.05% of the population recorded their language as 'Others' under Hindi as their first language.

== Rural poverty ==
40-50% of the population of Godda district were in the BPL category in 2004–2005, being in the same category as Giridih, Koderma and Hazaribagh districts. Rural poverty in Jharkhand declined from 66% in 1993–94 to 46% in 2004–05. In 2011, it has come down to 39.1%.

== Economy ==
=== Livelihood ===
Livelihood
in Godda CD block
1. Cultivators (25.1%)
2. Agricultural labourers (58.5%)
3. Household industries (2.03%)
4. Other Workers (14.4%)

In Godda CD block in 2011, amongst the class of total workers, cultivators numbered 22,922 and formed 25.12%, agricultural labourers numbered 53,352 and formed 58.47%, household industry workers numbered 1,852 and formed 2.03% and other workers numbered 13,120 and formed 14.38%. Total workers numbered 105,863 and formed 39.17% of the total population. Non-workers numbered 164,392 and formed 60.83% of total population.

Note: In the census records a person is considered a cultivator, if the person is engaged in cultivation/ supervision of land owned. When a person who works on another person's land for wages in cash or kind or share, is regarded as an agricultural labourer. Household industry is defined as an industry conducted by one or more members of the family within the household or village, and one that does not qualify for registration as a factory under the Factories Act. Other workers are persons engaged in some economic activity other than cultivators, agricultural labourers and household workers. It includes factory, mining, plantation, transport and office workers, those engaged in business and commerce, teachers and entertainment artistes.

=== Infrastructure ===
There are 197 inhabited villages in Godda CD block. In 2011, 99 villages had power supply. 8 villages had either treated or untreated tap water, 151 villages had well water (covered/ uncovered), 162 villages had hand pumps, and 35 villages did not have drinking water facility. 35 villages had post offices, 15 villages had sub post offices, 4 villages had telephones (land lines), 11 villages had public call offices and 69 villages had mobile phone coverage. 158 villages had pucca (paved) village roads, 21 villages had bus service (public/ private), 20 villages had autos/ modified autos, 13 villages had taxis/ vans, 45 villages had tractors, 12 villages had navigable waterways. 9 villages had bank branches, 6 village had ATMs, 16 villages had agricultural credit societies, 30 villages had cinema/ video halls, 35 villages had public libraries, public reading room. 96 villages had public distribution system, 45 villages had weekly haat (market) and 131 villages had assembly polling stations.

=== Agriculture ===
Around 80% of the population depends on agriculture, the main economic activity of the district but lack of irrigation facilities is a major constraint in raising the existing low levels of productivity. A sizable population is also engaged in animal husbandry and cottage industries. The livelihood scenario presented above indicates that a large population depends on agriculture. In Godda CD block 43.83% of the total area is cultivable area and 18.86% of the cultivable area is irrigated area.

=== Power plant ===
Adani Power is building a 1,600 MW thermal power plant spread across Motia, Gangta, Gayghat and other adjacent villages in Godda and Poraiyahat CD blocks. It is expected to be operational by 2022.

=== Backward Regions Grant Fund ===
Godda district is listed as a backward region and receives financial support from the Backward Regions Grant Fund. The fund created by the Government of India is designed to redress regional imbalances in development. As of 2012, 272 districts across the country were listed under this scheme. The list includes 21 districts of Jharkhand.

== Education ==
Godda CD block had 25 villages with pre-primary schools, 144 villages with primary schools, 79 villages with middle schools, 13 villages with secondary schools, 1 village with senior secondary school, 19 villages with vocational training school/ ITI, 2 villages with non-formal training centres, 51 villages with no educational facility.
.*Senior secondary schools are also known as Inter colleges in Jharkhand

== Healthcare ==
Godda CD block had 6 villages with primary health centres, 21 villages with primary health subcentres, 2 villages with allopathic hospitals, 2 villages with dispensaries, 4 villages with family welfare centres, 9 villages with medicine shops.
.*Private medical practitioners, alternative medicine etc. not included
