= Meharama =

Meharama Mehrma
- Community development block
- Coordinates: 25°12′6″N 87°21′59″E
- Country: India
- State: Jharkhand
- District: Godda

Government
  - Type: Federal democracy

Area
  - Total: 131.70 km^{2} (50.85 sq mi)
- Elevation: 53 m (174 ft)

Population (2011)
  - Total: 146,325
  - Density: 1,111.0/km^{2} (2,877.6/sq mi)

Languages
  - Official: Hindi, Urdu

Literacy (2011)
  - Total literates: 65,788 (55.99%)
- Time zone: UTC+5:30 (IST)
- PIN: 814160 (Meharama)
- Telephone/STD code: 06437
- Vehicle registration: JH-17
- Lok Sabha constituency: Godda
- Vidhan Sabha constituency: Mahagama
- Website: godda.nic.in

Meharama (also spelled Meharma, Mehrma) is a community development block that forms an administrative division in the Godda subdivision of the Godda district, Jharkhand state, India.

== Geography ==
Mehrma, the eponymous CD block headquarters, is located at 25°12′6″N 87°21′59″E.

It is located 49 km from Godda, the district headquarters.

Godda district is a plateau region with undulating uplands, long ridges and depressions. The western portion of the Rajmahal hills passes through the district. The plain areas have lost its once rich forests but the hills still retain some. Kajhia, Sunder and Sakri rivers flow through the district.

Meharama CD block is bounded by the Pirpainti CD block in Bhagalpur district of Bihar on the north, Thakurgangti and Boarijore CD blocks on the east, Mahagama CD block on the south, and Colgong and Sonahaula CD blocks in Bhagapur district of Bihar on the west.

Meharama CD block has an area of 131.70 km^{2}.Mehrma and Belbadda police stations serve this block. Headquarters of this CD block is at Mehrma village.

== Demographics ==
=== Population ===
According to the 2011 Census of India, Meharama CD block had a total population of 146,325, all of which were rural. There were 76,588 (52%) males and 69,737 (48%) females. Population in the age range 0–6 years was 28,822. Scheduled Castes numbered 22,253 (15.21%) and Scheduled Tribes numbered 13,451 (9.19%).

In the 2011 census, Mehrma (village) had a population of 3,234. Meherama CD block had three large villages (2011 population in brackets): Singhari (4,191), Sudin (4,999) and Kasba (4,121).

=== Literacy ===
As of 2011 census, the total number of literates in Meherma CD block was 65,788 (55.99% of the population over 6 years) out of which 40,865 (60%) were males and 24,923 (40%) were females. The gender disparity (the difference between female and male literacy rates) was 20%.

See also – List of Jharkhand districts ranked by literacy rate

Literacy in CD Blocks of
Godda district
Meharama – 55.99%
Thakurgangti – 56.64%
Boarijore – 45.68%
Mahagama – 55.66%
Pathargama – 61.31%
Basantrai – 56.60%
Godda – 59.58%
Poraiyahat – 56.33%
Sunderpahari – 43.62%
Source: 2011 Census: CD Block Wise
Primary Census Abstract Data

=== Language and religion ===
Religions in Meharama block (2011)
Religion	Percent
Hinduism	74.12%
Islam	22.94%
Sarna	2.28%
Christianity	0.48%
Other or not stated	0.18%

Languages of Meharama block (2011)
1. 'Other' Hindi (74.1%)
2. Urdu (6.44%)
3. Bhojpuri (5.65%)
4. Santali (4.92%)
5. Kurukh (4.05%)
6. Hindi (3.80%)
7. Others (1.03%)

At the time of the 2011 census, 6.44% of the population spoke Urdu, 5.65% Bhojpuri, 4.92% Santali, 4.05% Kurukh and 3.80% Hindi as their first language. 74.11% of the population recorded their language as 'Others' under Hindi as their first language.

== Rural poverty ==
40-50% of the population of Godda district were in the BPL category in 2004–2005, being in the same category as Giridih, Koderma and Hazaribagh districts. Rural poverty in Jharkhand declined from 66% in 1993–94 to 46% in 2004–05. In 2011, it has come down to 39.1%.

== Economy ==
=== Livelihood ===
Livelihood
in Meharama CD block
1. Cultivators (18.4%)
2. Agricultural labourers (65.6%)
3. Household industries (2.43%)
4. Other Workers (14.1%)

In Meharama CD block in 2011, amongst the class of total workers, cultivators numbered 10,456 and formed 18.39%, agricultural labourers numbered 36,974 and formed 65.64%, household industry workers numbered 1,381 and formed 2.43% and other workers numbered 8,034 and formed 14.13%. Total workers numbered 56,845 and formed 38.85% of the total population. Non-workers numbered 89,480 and formed 61.15% of total population.

Note: In the census records a person is considered a cultivator, if the person is engaged in cultivation/ supervision of land owned. When a person who works on another person's land for wages in cash or kind or share, is regarded as an agricultural labourer. Household industry is defined as an industry conducted by one or more members of the family within the household or village, and one that does not qualify for registration as a factory under the Factories Act. Other workers are persons engaged in some economic activity other than cultivators, agricultural labourers and household workers. It includes factory, mining, plantation, transport and office workers, those engaged in business and commerce, teachers and entertainment artistes.

=== Infrastructure ===
There are 144 inhabited villages in Meharama CD block. In 2011, 48 villages had power supply. 30 villages had tap water (treated/ untreated), 133 villages had well water (covered/ uncovered), 97 villages had hand pumps, and all villages had drinking water facility. 19 villages had post offices, 15 villages had sub post offices, 7 villages had telephones (land lines), 14 villages had public call offices and 58 villages had mobile phone coverage. 100 villages had pucca (paved) village roads, 24 villages had bus service (public/ private), 6 villages had autos/ modified autos,6 villages had taxis/ vans and 47 villages had tractors, 5 villages had navigable waterways. 7 villages had bank branches, 5 villages had ATMs, 7 villages had agricultural credit societies, 35 villages had cinema/ video halls, 36 villages had public libraries and public reading rooms. 78 villages had public distribution system, 48 villages had weekly haat (market) and 102 villages had assembly polling stations.

=== Agriculture ===
Around 80% of the population depends on agriculture, the main economic activity of the district but lack of irrigation facilities is a major constraint in raising the existing low levels of productivity. A sizable population is also engaged in animal husbandry and cottage industries. The livelihood scenario presented above indicates that a large population depends on agriculture. In Meharama CD block 75.77% of the total area is cultivable area and 26.66% of the cultivable area is irrigated area.

=== Backward Regions Grant Fund ===
Godda district is listed as a backward region and receives financial support from the Backward Regions Grant Fund. The fund created by the Government of India is designed to redress regional imbalances in development. As of 2012, 272 districts across the country were listed under this scheme. The list includes 21 districts of Jharkhand.

== Education ==
Meharama CD block had 15 villages with pre-primary schools, 83 villages with primary schools, 64 villages with middle schools, 9 villages with secondary schools, 1 village with senior secondary school, 2 villages with general degree colleges, 1 village with non-formal training centre, 59 villages with no educational facility.
.*Senior secondary schools are also known as Inter colleges in Jharkhand

Sri Raghunandan Tiwari College, Dhamri was established in 1961.

== Healthcare ==
Meharama CD block had 4 villages with primary health centres, 12 villages with primary health subcentres, 6 village with maternity and child welfare centre, 4 TB clinics, 7 villages with allopathic hospitals, 7 villages with dispensaries, 3 villages with veterinary hospitals, 4 villages with family welfare centres, 17 villages with medicine shops.
.*Private medical practitioners, alternative medicine etc. not included
