= Bhagaiya =

Village in India

Coordinates: 25.189°N 87.476°E

Bhagaiya, also Bhagaia, is a village panchayat in Godda district, Jharkhand state, India. The village is known for its traditional handloom silk manufacturing and weaving and for that reason is also known as Resham Nagar ("Silk city").

There is a Lord Shiva temple, surrounded by the small hills and forest, in the middle of the village.
