= Pathargama =

- Community development block
- Coordinates: 24°56′42″N 87°16′38″E
- Country: India
- State: Jharkhand
- District: Godda

Government
  - Type: Federal democracy

Area
  - Total: 155.91 km^{2} (60.20 sq mi)
- Elevation: 53 m (174 ft)

Population (2011)
  - Total: 115,662
  - Density: 741.85/km^{2} (1,921.4/sq mi)

Languages
  - Official: Hindi, Urdu

Literacy (2011)
  - Total literates: 58,352 (61.31%)
- Time zone: UTC+5:30 (IST)
- PIN: 814147 (Pathergama)
- Telephone/STD code: 06437
- Vehicle registration: JH 17
- Lok Sabha constituency: Godda
- Vidhan Sabha constituency: Godda
- Website: godda.nic.in

Pathargama is a community development block that forms an administrative division in the Godda subdivision of the Godda district, Jharkhand state, India.

== Geography ==
Pathargama, the eponymous CD block headquarters, is located at 24°56′42″N 87°16′38″E.

It is located 19 km from Godda, the district headquarters.

Godda district is a plateau region with undulating uplands, long ridges and depressions. The western portion of the Rajmahal hills passes through the district. The plain areas have lost its once rich forests but the hills still retain some. Kajhia, Sunder and Sakri rivers flow through the district.

Pathargama CD block is bounded by Basantrai and Mahagama CD blocks on the north, Boarijore and Sunderpahari CD blocks on the east, Godda CD block on the south, and Dhuraiya CD block in Banka district of Bihar on the west.

Pathargama CD block has an area of 155.91 km^{2}.Pathargama police station serves this block. Headquarters of this CD block is at Pathargama village.

== Demographics ==
=== Population ===
According to the 2011 Census of India, Pathargama CD block had a total population of 115,662, all of which were rural. There were 59,780 (52%) males and 55,882 (48%) females. Population in the age range 0–6 years was 20,491. Scheduled Castes numbered 13,537 (11.70%) and Scheduled Tribes numbered 18,646 (16.12%).

In 2011 census, Pathargama (village) had a population of 3,490.

=== Literacy ===
As of 2011 census, the total number of literate persons in Pathargama CD block was 58,352 (61.31% of the population over 6 years) out of which 36,571 (63%) were males and 21,781 (37%) were females. The gender disparity (the difference between female and male literacy rates) was 26%.

See also – List of Jharkhand districts ranked by literacy rate

Literacy in CD Blocks of
Godda district
Meharama – 55.99%
Thakurgangti – 56.64%
Boarijore – 45.68%
Mahagama – 55.66%
Pathargama – 61.31%
Basantrai – 56.60%
Godda – 59.58%
Poraiyahat – 56.33%
Sunderpahari – 43.62%
Source: 2011 Census: CD Block Wise
Primary Census Abstract Data

=== Language and religion ===
Religions in Pathargama block (2011)
Religion	Percent
Hinduism	86.74%
Islam	9.86%
Sarna	2.44%
Christianity	0.83%
Other or not stated	0.12%

Languages of Pathargama block (2011)
1. 'Other' Hindi (57.1%)
2. Santali (15.5%)
3. Kurmali (8.56%)
4. Khortha (5.86%)
5. Bhojpuri (4.99%)
6. Hindi (3.58%)
7. Urdu (2.99%)
8. Others (1.46%)

At the time of the 2011 census, 15.46% of the population spoke Santali, 8.56% Kurmali, 5.86% Khortha, 4.99% Bhojpuri, 3.58% Hindi and 2.99% Urdu as their first language. 57.10% of the population recorded their language as 'Others' under Hindi as their first language.

== Rural poverty ==
40-50% of the population of Godda district were in the BPL category in 2004–2005, being in the same category as Giridih, Koderma and Hazaribagh districts. Rural poverty in Jharkhand declined from 66% in 1993–94 to 46% in 2004–05. In 2011, it has come down to 39.1%.

== Economy ==
=== Livelihood ===
Livelihood
in Pathargama CD block
1. Cultivators (33.3%)
2. Agricultural labourers (52.8%)
3. Household industries (1.96%)
4. Other Workers (11.9%)

In Pathargama CD block in 2011, amongst the class of total workers, cultivators numbered 16,965 and formed 33.33%, agricultural labourers numbered 26,866 and formed 52.79%, household industry workers numbered 1,060 and formed 1.96% and other workers numbered 6,065 and formed 11.92%. Total workers numbered 50,896 and formed 44% of the total population. Non-workers numbered 64,766 and formed 56% of total population.

Note: In the census records a person is considered a cultivator, if the person is engaged in cultivation/ supervision of land owned. When a person who works on another person's land for wages in cash or kind or share, is regarded as an agricultural labourer. Household industry is defined as an industry conducted by one or more members of the family within the household or village, and one that does not qualify for registration as a factory under the Factories Act. Other workers are persons engaged in some economic activity other than cultivators, agricultural labourers and household workers. It includes factory, mining, plantation, transport and office workers, those engaged in business and commerce, teachers and entertainment artistes.

=== Infrastructure ===
There are 146 inhabited villages in Pathargama CD block. In 2011, 65 villages had power supply. 14 villages had tap water (treated/ untreated), 95 villages had well water (covered/ uncovered), 116 villages had hand pumps, and 27 villages did not have drinking water facility. 19 villages had post offices, 5 villages had sub post offices, 14 villages had telephones (land lines), 28 villages had public call offices and 60 villages had mobile phone coverage. 111 villages had pucca (paved) village roads, 18 villages had bus service (public/ private), 10 villages had autos/ modified autos, 15 villages had taxis/ vans, 23 villages had tractors, 5 villages had navigable waterways. 6 villages had bank branches, 1 village had ATMs, 6 villages had agricultural credit societies, 30 villages had cinema/ video halls, 31 villages had public libraries, public reading room. 58 villages had public distribution system, 42 villages had weekly haat (market) and 52 villages had assembly polling stations.

=== Agriculture ===
Around 80% of the population depends on agriculture, the main economic activity of the district but lack of irrigation facilities is a major constraint in raising the existing low levels of productivity. A sizable population is also engaged in animal husbandry and cottage industries. The livelihood scenario presented above indicates that a large population depends on agriculture. In Pathargama CD block 74.70% of the total area is cultivable area and 11.52% of the cultivable area is irrigated area.

=== Backward Regions Grant Fund ===
Godda district is listed as a backward region and receives financial support from the Backward Regions Grant Fund. The fund created by the Government of India is designed to redress regional imbalances in development. As of 2012, 272 districts across the country were listed under this scheme. The list includes 21 districts of Jharkhand.

== Education ==
Pathargama CD block had 17 villages with pre-primary schools, 97 villages with primary schools, 61 villages with middle schools, 13 villages with secondary schools, 5 villages with senior secondary schools, 5 vocational training schools/ ITI, 8 villages with non-formal training centres, 47 villages with no educational facility.
.*Senior secondary schools are also known as Inter colleges in Jharkhand

SBSSPSJ College was established at Pathargama in 1980. It is affiliated with Sido Kanhu Murmu University. It offers both honours and general courses in arts, science and commerce.

== Healthcare ==
Pathargama CD block had 4 villages with primary health centres, 15 villages with primary health subcentres, 3 village with maternity and child welfare centre, 1 village with TB clinic, 2 villages with allopathic hospitals, 1 village with dispensary, 1 village with veterinary hospital, 1 village with family welfare centre, 3 villages with medicine shops.
.*Private medical practitioners, alternative medicine etc. not included
