= Sunderpahari =

- Community development block
- Coordinates: 24°45′18.2″N 87°21′43.6″E
- Country: India
- State: Jharkhand
- District: Godda

Government
  - Type: Federal democracy

Area
  - Total: 429.88 km^{2} (165.98 sq mi)
- Elevation: 38 m (125 ft)

Population (2011)
  - Total: 187,489
  - Density: 436.14/km^{2} (1,129.6/sq mi)

Languages
  - Official: Hindi, Urdu

Literacy (2011)
  - Total literates: 87,791 (56.33%)
- Time zone: UTC+5:30 (IST)
- PIN: 814153 (Poraiyahat); 814156 (Sarouni Bazar)
- Telephone/STD code: 06422
- Vehicle registration: JH 17
- Lok Sabha constituency: rajmahal
- Vidhan Sabha constituency: barhait
- Website: godda.nic.in

Sunderpahari (also spelled Sundarpahari, Sundar Pahari) is a CD block that forms an administrative division in the Godda subdivision of the Godda district, Jharkhand state, India.

== Geography ==
Sunderpahari, the CD block headquarters, is located at 24°45′18.2″N 87°21′43.6″E.

It is located 15 km from Godda, the district headquarters.

Godda district is a plateau region with undulating uplands, long ridges and depressions. The western portion of the Rajmahal hills passes through the district. The plain areas have lost their once-rich forests but the hills still retain some. The Kajhia, Sunder and Sakri rivers flow through the district.

The Rajmahal Hills cover most of the Boarijore and Sunderpahari CD blocks in Godda district.

Sunderpahari CD block is bounded by Boarijore CD block on the north, Barhait CD block in Sahibganj district and Littipara and Amrapara CD blocks in Pakur district on the east, Gopikandar CD block in Dumka district on the south, and Paraiyaht, Godda and Pathargama CD blocks on the west.

Sunderpahari CD block has an area of 429.88 km^{2}.Sunderpahari and Rajabhita police stations serve this block. Headquarters of this CD block is at Sunderpahari village.

== Demographics ==
=== Population ===
According to the 2011 Census of India, Sunderpahari CD block had a total population of 65,463, all of which were rural. There were 32,895 (50%) males and 32,568 (50%) females. Population in the age range 0–6 years was 11,724. Scheduled Castes numbered 1,399 (2.14%) and Scheduled Tribes numbered 50,133 (76.58%).

In the 2011 census, Sunderpahari (village) had a population of 888.

=== Literacy ===
According to the 2011 census, the total number of literate persons in Sunderpahari CD block was 23,441 (43.62% of the population over 6 years) out of which 14,662 (63%) were males and 8,779 (37%) were females. The gender disparity (the difference between female and male literacy rates) was 26%.

See also – List of Jharkhand districts ranked by literacy rate

Literacy in CD Blocks of
Godda district
Meharama – 55.99%
Thakurgangti – 56.64%
Boarijore – 45.68%
Mahagama – 55.66%
Pathargama – 61.31%
Basantrai – 56.60%
Godda – 59.58%
Poraiyahat – 56.33%
Sunderpahari – 43.62%
Source: 2011 Census: CD Block Wise
Primary Census Abstract Data

=== Language and religion ===
Religions in Sundarpahari block (2011)
Religion	Percent
Hinduism	76.66%
Christianity	15.93%
Islam	6.65%
Sarna	0.53%
Other or not stated	0.23%

Languages of Sundarpahari block (2011)
1. Santali (51.6%)
2. Malto (24.3%)
3. Khortha (14.5%)
4. Bengali (3.92%)
5. Bhojpuri (1.94%)
6. 'Other' Hindi (1.94%)
7. Hindi (0.95%)
8. Others (0.88%)

At the time of the 2011 census, 51.56% of the population spoke Santali, 24.29% Malto, 14.52% Khortha, 3.92% Bengali, 1.94% Bhojpuri and 0.95% Hindi as their first language. 1.94% of the population recorded their language as 'Others' under Hindi as their first language.

== Rural poverty ==
40-50% of the population of Godda district were in the BPL category in 2004–2005, being in the same category as Giridih, Koderma and Hazaribagh districts. Rural poverty in Jharkhand declined from 66% in 1993–94 to 46% in 2004–05. In 2011, it has come down to 39.1%.

== Economy ==
=== Livelihood ===
Livelihood
in Sunderpahari CD block
1. Cultivators (43.4%)
2. Agricultural labourers (46.7%)
3. Household industries (2.81%)
4. Other Workers (7.10%)

In Sunderpahari CD block in 2011, amongst the class of total workers, cultivators numbered 15,344 and formed 43.41%, agricultural labourers numbered 16,500 and formed 46.68%, household industry workers numbered 994 and formed 2.81% and other workers numbered 2,509 and formed 7.10%. Total workers numbered 35,347 and formed 54.00% of the total population. Non-workers numbered 30,116 and formed 46.00% of total population.

Note: In the census records a person is considered a cultivator, if the person is engaged in cultivation/ supervision of land owned. When a person who works on another person's land for wages in cash or kind or share, is regarded as an agricultural labourer. Household industry is defined as an industry conducted by one or more members of the family within the household or village, and one that does not qualify for registration as a factory under the Factories Act. Other workers are persons engaged in some economic activity other than cultivators, agricultural labourers and household workers. It includes factory, mining, plantation, transport and office workers, those engaged in business and commerce, teachers and entertainment artistes.

=== Infrastructure ===
There are 221 inhabited villages in Sunderpahari CD block. In 2011, 9 villages had power supply. 5 villages had tap water (treated/ untreated), 112 villages had well water (covered/ uncovered), 143 villages had hand pumps, and 43 villages did not have drinking water facility. 7 villages had post offices, 11 villages had sub post offices, 1 village had telephones (land lines), 5 villages had public call offices and 82 villages had mobile phone coverage. 159 villages had pucca (paved) village roads, 9 villages had bus service (public/ private), 3 villages had taxis/ vans, 52 villages had tractors. 2 villages had bank branches, 2 villages had agricultural credit societies, 21 villages had cinema/ video halls, 22 villages had public libraries, public reading room. 48 villages had public distribution system, 37 villages had weekly haat (market) and 63 villages had assembly polling stations.

=== Coal mining ===
Godda district is rich in coal. A major coal mining project of Eastern Coalfields Limited (Rajmahal open cast project, a part of Rajmahal coalfield) is going on in Boarijore, Mahagama and Sunderpahari CD blocks.

The Rajmahal Opencast project came up in the early 1980s with an annual cpapcity of 5 million tonnes. The capacity was raised to 10.5 million tonnes with Canadian collaboration in 1994. The capacity is being expanded to 17 million tonnes.

EMIL the mining arm of the Aditya Birla Group has been involved in the functioning of Rajmahal Opencast Mines of Eastern Coalfields. Mining operations started in July 2013. It is expected to produce 200 million tonnes of coal over 12.5 years. With the involvement of the Essel Mining and Industries Limited (EMIL) in the Rajmahal Opencast project, supplies to the 2,340 MW Kahalgaon Super Thermal Power Station and the 2,100 MW Farakka Super Thermal Power Station of NTPC were expected to improve.

=== Power plant ===
Jindal Steel and Power had planned for a 2 X 660 MW captive power plant at Nipania (near Sunderpahari in Sundarpahari CD block) for their upcoming steel plants at Patratu and Asanboni, both in Jharkhand. In spite of the ground-breaking ceremony having been presided over by Pranab Mukherjee, President of India, in April 2013, as of 2020 the project has made no progress except for some land acquisition. Jitapur coal block, located 10 km from the project site and having a reserve of 65 million tonnes of coal, was initially earmarked for the power plant but was later allotted to Adani Power. Efforts are being made to get the project going or return of the acquired land.

=== Agriculture ===
Around 80% of the population depends on agriculture, the main economic activity of the district but lack of irrigation facilities is a major constraint in raising the existing low levels of productivity. A sizable population is also engaged in animal husbandry and cottage industries. The livelihood scenario presented above indicates that a large population depends on agriculture. In Sunderpahari CD block 21.42% of the total area is cultivable area and 8.47% of the cultivable area is irrigated area.

=== Backward Regions Grant Fund ===
Godda district is listed as a backward region and receives financial support from the Backward Regions Grant Fund. The fund created by the Government of India is designed to redress regional imbalances in development. As of 2012, 272 districts across the country were listed under this scheme. The list includes 21 districts of Jharkhand.

== Education ==
Sunderpahari CD block had 25 villages with pre-primary schools, 112 villages with primary schools, 47 villages with middle schools, 9 villages with secondary schools, 106 villages with no educational facility.

== Healthcare ==
Sunderpahari CD block had 1 village with primary health centre, 12 villages with primary health subcentres, 2 villages with allopathic hospitals, 1 village with dispensary, 1 village with family welfare centre, 3 villages with medicine shops.
.*Private medical practitioners, alternative medicine etc. not included
