= Mahagama (community development block) =

- Community development block
- Coordinates: 25°1′44″N 87°19′15″E
- Country: India
- State: Jharkhand
- District: Godda

Government
  - Type: Federal democracy

Area
  - Total: 163.30 km^{2} (63.05 sq mi)
- Elevation: 38 m (125 ft)

Population (2011)
  - Total: 196,976
  - Density: 1,206.2/km^{2} (3,124.1/sq mi)

Languages
  - Official: Hindi, Urdu

Literacy (2011)
  - Total literates: 87,627 (55.66%)
- Time zone: UTC+5:30 (IST)
- PIN: 814154 (Mahagama); 814165 (Lalmatia Colliery)
- Telephone/STD code: 06437
- Vehicle registration: JH 17
- Lok Sabha constituency: Godda
- Vidhan Sabha constituency: Mahagama
- Website: godda.nic.in

Mahagama is a CD block that forms an administrative division in the Godda subdivision of the Godda district, Jharkhand state, India.

== Geography ==
Mahagama, the eponymous CD block headquarters, is located at 25°1′44″N 87°19′15″E.

It is located 43 km from Godda, the district headquarters.

Godda district is a plateau region with undulating uplands, long ridges and depressions. The western portion of the Rajmahal hills passes through the district. The plain areas have lost its once rich forests but the hills still retain some. Kajhia, Sunder and Sakri rivers flow through the district.

The Mahagama CD block is bounded by Meharama CD block on the north, Boarijore CD block on the east, Pathargama and Basantrai CD blocks on the south, and Sonhaula CD block in Bhagalpur district of Bihar on the west.

Mahagama CD block has an area of 163.30 km^{2}.Mahagama and Hanwara police stations serve this block. Headquarters of this CD block is at Mahagama town.

== Demographics ==
=== Population ===
According to the 2011 Census of India, Mahagama CD block had a population of 196,796, of which 186,007 were rural and 10,969 were urban. There were 101,987 (52%) males and 94,989 (48%) females. Population in the age range 0–6 years was 39,553. Scheduled Castes numbered 19,443 (9.87%) and Scheduled Tribes numbered 14,010 (7.11%).

According to the 2011 census, Mahagama, a census town in Mahagama CD block, had a population of 10,969. There were five large villages in Mahagama CD block (2011 population in brackets): Dighi (5,885), Parsa (6,101), Banjpur (4,328), Nayanagar (4,434) and Logain (4,199).

=== Literacy ===
According to the 2011 census, the number of literate persons in the Mahagama CD block was 87,627 (55.66% of the population over 6 years) out of which 54,515 (62%) were males and 33,112 (38%) were females. The gender disparity (the difference between female and male literacy rates) was 24%.

See also – List of Jharkhand districts ranked by literacy rate

Literacy in CD Blocks of
Godda district
Meharama – 55.99%
Thakurgangti – 56.64%
Boarijore – 45.68%
Mahagama – 55.66%
Pathargama – 61.31%
Basantrai – 56.60%
Godda – 59.58%
Poraiyahat – 56.33%
Sunderpahari – 43.62%
Source: 2011 Census: CD Block Wise
Primary Census Abstract Data

=== Language and religion ===
Religions in Mahagama block (2011)
Religion	Percent
Hinduism	51.72%
Islam	45.85%
Sarna	1.92%
Other or not stated	0.51%

Languages of Mahagama block (2011)
1. 'Other' Hindi (57.5%)
2. Urdu (23.6%)
3. Hindi (6.08%)
4. Santali (5.96%)
5. Khortha (3.25%)
6. Bhojpuri (1.73%)
7. Others (1.96%)

At the time of the 2011 census, 23.55% of the population spoke Urdu, 6.08% Hindi, 5.96% Santali, 3.25% Khortha and 1.73% Bhojpuri as their first language. 57.47% of the population recorded their language as 'Others' under Hindi as their first language.

== Rural poverty ==
40-50% of the population of Godda district were in the BPL category in 2004–2005, being in the same category as Giridih, Koderma and Hazaribagh districts. Rural poverty in Jharkhand declined from 66% in 1993–94 to 46% in 2004–05. In 2011, it has come down to 39.1%.

== Economy ==
=== Livelihood ===
Livelihood
in Mahagama CD block
1. Cultivators (21.0%)
2. Agricultural labourers (62.1%)
3. Household industries (2.64%)
4. Other Workers (14.2%)

In Mahagama CD block in 2011, amongst the class of total workers, cultivators numbered 16,181 and formed 21.01%, agricultural labourers numbered 47,836 and formed 62.11%, household industry workers numbered 2,036 and formed 2.64% and other workers numbered 10,969 and formed 14.24%. Total workers numbered 80,146 and formed 40.69% of the total population. Non-workers numbered 116,830 and formed 59.31% of total population.

Note: In the census records a person is considered a cultivator, if the person is engaged in cultivation/ supervision of land owned. When a person who works on another person's land for wages in cash or kind or share, is regarded as an agricultural labourer. Household industry is defined as an industry conducted by one or more members of the family within the household or village, and one that does not qualify for registration as a factory under the Factories Act. Other workers are persons engaged in some economic activity other than cultivators, agricultural labourers and household workers. It includes factory, mining, plantation, transport and office workers, those engaged in business and commerce, teachers and entertainment artistes.

=== Infrastructure ===
There are 245 inhabited villages in Mahagama CD block. In 2011, 100 villages had power supply. 64 villages had tap water (treated/ untreated), 166 villages had well water (covered/ uncovered), 170 villages had hand pumps, and 56 villages did not have drinking water facility. 28 villages had post offices, 17 villages had sub post offices, 15 villages had telephones (land lines), 17 villages had public call offices and 64 villages had mobile phone coverage. 173 villages had pucca (paved) village roads, 27 villages had bus service (public/ private), 3 villages had autos/ modified autos, 5 villages had taxis/ vans, 65 villages had tractors, 34 villages had navigable waterways. 6 villages had bank branches, 1 village had ATMs, 1 village had agricultural credit society, 66 villages had cinema/ video halls, 65 villages had public libraries, public reading room. 125 villages had public distribution system, 81 villages had weekly haat (market) and 138 villages had assembly polling stations.

=== Coal mining ===
Godda district is rich in coal. A major coal mining project of Eastern Coalfields Limited (Rajmahal open cast project, a part of Rajmahal coalfield) is going on in Boarijore, Mahagama and Sunderpahari CD blocks.

The Rajmahal Opencast project came up in the early 1980s with an annual cpapcity of 5 million tonnes. The capacity was raised to 10.5 million tonnes with Canadian collaboration in 1994. The capacity is being expanded to 17 million tonnes.

EMIL the mining arm of the Aditya Birla Group has been involved in the functioning of Rajmahal Opencast Mines of Eastern Coalfields. Mining operations started in July 2013. It is expected to produce 200 million tonnes of coal over 12.5 years. With the involvement of the Essel Mining and Industries Limited (EMIL) in the Rajmahal Opencast project, supplies to the 2,340 MW Kahalgaon Super Thermal Power Station and the 2,100 MW Farakka Super Thermal Power Station of NTPC were expected to improve. In Mahgama CD block, major mining activity in near Mahagama town. Please see the satellite view of the Google map.

=== Agriculture ===
Around 80% of the population depends on agriculture, the main economic activity of the district but lack of irrigation facilities is a major constraint in raising the existing low levels of productivity. A sizable population is also engaged in animal husbandry and cottage industries. The livelihood scenario presented above indicates that a large population depends on agriculture. In Mahagama CD block 57.05% of the total area is cultivable area and 27.28% of the cultivable area is irrigated area.

=== Backward Regions Grant Fund ===
Godda district is listed as a backward region and receives financial support from the Backward Regions Grant Fund. The fund created by the Government of India is designed to redress regional imbalances in development. As of 2012, 272 districts across the country were listed under this scheme. The list includes 21 districts of Jharkhand.

== Education ==
Mahagama CD block had 41 villages with pre-primary schools, 126 villages with primary schools, 53 villages with middle schools, 12 villages with secondary schools, 5 villages with senior secondary schools, 1 general degree college, 4 villages with non-formal training centres, 117 villages with no educational facility.
.*Senior secondary schools are also known as Inter colleges in Jharkhand

Millat College at Parsa was established in 1972.

== Healthcare ==
Mahagama CD block had 3 villages with primary health centres, 13 villages with primary health subcentres, 3 village with maternity and child welfare centre, 3 villages with allopathic hospitals, 2 villages with dispensaries, 21 villages with medicine shops.
.*Private medical practitioners, alternative medicine etc. not included
