= Basantrai =

- Community development block
- Coordinates: 24°59′41.8″N 87°12′7.7″E
- Country: India
- State: Jharkhand
- District: Godda

Government
  - Type: Federal democracy

Area
  - Total: 88.57 km^{2} (34.20 sq mi)
- Elevation: 53 m (174 ft)

Population (2011)
  - Total: 93,448
  - Density: 1,055/km^{2} (2,733/sq mi)

Languages
  - Official: Hindi, Urdu

Literacy (2011)
  - Total literates: 40,198 (56.60%)
- Time zone: UTC+5:30 (IST)
- PIN: 814155 (Basantrai)
- Telephone/STD code: 06437
- Vehicle registration: JH-17
- Lok Sabha constituency: Godda
- Vidhan Sabha constituency: Godda
- Website: godda.nic.in

Basantrai (also spelled Basant Rai, Bashant Rai) is a community development block that forms an administrative division in the Godda subdivision of the Godda district, Jharkhand state, India.

== History ==
Basantrai was created a new block in 2009.

== Geography ==
Basantrai, the eponymous CD block headquarters, is located at 24°59′41.8″N 87°12′7.7″E.

It is located 19 km from Godda, the district headquarters.

Godda district is a plateau region with undulating uplands, long ridges and depressions. The western portion of the Rajmahal hills passes through the district. The plain areas have lost its once rich forests but the hills still retain some. Kajhia, Sunder and Sakri rivers flow through the district.

Basantrai CD block is bounded by Mahagama CD block on the north, Pathargama CD block on the east and the south, and Dhuraiya CD block in Banka district of Bihar on the west.

Basantrai CD block has an area of 88.57 km^{2}. Basantrai police station serves this block. Headquarters of this CD block is at Basantrai village.

== Demographics ==
=== Population ===
According to the 2011 Census of India, Basantrai CD block had a total population of 93,448, all of which were rural. There were 48,317 (52%) males and 45,131 (48%) females. Population in the age range 0–6 years was 19,432. Scheduled Castes numbered 10,816 (11.57%) and Scheduled Tribes numbered 2,660 (2.85%).

In the 2011 census, Basantrai (village) had a population of 581.

=== Literacy ===
According to the 2011 census, the total number of literate persons in Basantrai CD block was 40,198 (56.60% of the population over 6 years) out of which 25,204 (63%) were males and 14,994 (37%) were females. The gender disparity (the difference between female and male literacy rates) was 26%.

See also – List of Jharkhand districts ranked by literacy rate

Literacy in CD Blocks of
Godda district
Meharama – 55.99%
Thakurgangti – 56.64%
Boarijore – 45.68%
Mahagama – 55.66%
Pathargama – 61.31%
Basantrai – 56.60%
Godda – 59.58%
Poraiyahat – 56.33%
Sunderpahari – 43.62%
Source: 2011 Census: CD Block Wise
Primary Census Abstract Data

=== Language and religion ===
Religions in Basantrai block (2011)
Religion	Percent
Islam	50.02%
Hinduism	48.79%
Sarna	1.00%
Other or not stated	0.18%

Languages of Basantrai block (2011)
1. 'Other' Hindi (70.4%)
2. Urdu (25.4%)
3. Santali (2.72%)
4. Hindi (1.17%)
5. Others (0.36%)

At the time of the 2011 census, 25.39% of the population spoke Urdu, 2.72% Santali and 1.17% Hindi as their first language. 70.36% of the population recorded their language as 'Others' under Hindi as their first language.

== Rural poverty ==
40-50% of the population of Godda district were in the BPL category in 2004–2005, being in the same category as Giridih, Koderma and Hazaribagh districts. Rural poverty in Jharkhand declined from 66% in 1993–94 to 46% in 2004–05. In 2011, it has come down to 39.1%.

== Economy ==
=== Livelihood ===
Livelihood
in Basantrai CD block
1. Cultivators (28.0%)
2. Agricultural labourers (58.2%)
3. Household industries (1.95%)
4. Other Workers (11.8%)

In Basantrai CD block in 2011, amongst the class of total workers, cultivators numbered 9,714 and formed 28.04%, agricultural labourers numbered 20,158 and formed 58.18%, household industry workers numbered 675 and formed 1.95% and other workers numbered 4,100 and formed 11.83%. Total workers numbered 36,467 and formed 37.08% of the total population. Non-workers numbered 58,801 and formed 62.92% of total population.

Note: In the census records a person is considered a cultivator, if the person is engaged in cultivation/ supervision of land owned. When a person who works on another person's land for wages in cash or kind or share, is regarded as an agricultural labourer. Household industry is defined as an industry conducted by one or more members of the family within the household or village, and one that does not qualify for registration as a factory under the Factories Act. Other workers are persons engaged in some economic activity other than cultivators, agricultural labourers and household workers. It includes factory, mining, plantation, transport and office workers, those engaged in business and commerce, teachers and entertainment artistes.

=== Infrastructure ===
There are 83 inhabited villages in Basantrai CD block. In 2011, 26 villages had power supply. 5 villages had tap water (treated/ untreated), 50 villages had well water (covered/ uncovered), 64 villages had hand pumps, and 18 villages did not have drinking water facility. 14 villages had post offices, 4 villages had sub post offices, 3 villages had telephones (land lines), 8 villages had public call offices and 33 villages had mobile phone coverage. 58 villages had pucca (paved) village roads, 12 villages had bus service (public/ private), 5 villages had autos/ modified autos, 7 villages had taxis/ vans, 29 villages had tractors, 11 villages had navigable waterways. 6 villages had bank branches, 3 villages had agricultural credit societies, 25 villages had cinema/ video halls, 26 villages had public libraries, public reading room. 60 villages had public distribution system, 38 villages had weekly haat (market) and 55 villages had assembly polling stations.

=== Agriculture ===
Around 80% of the population depends on agriculture, the main economic activity of the district but lack of irrigation facilities is a major constraint in raising the existing low levels of productivity. A sizable population is also engaged in animal husbandry and cottage industries. The livelihood scenario presented above indicates that a large population depends on agriculture. In Basantrai CD block 66.78% of the total area is cultivable area and 7.70% of the cultivable area is irrigated area.

=== Backward Regions Grant Fund ===
Godda district is listed as a backward region and receives financial support from the Backward Regions Grant Fund. The fund created by the Government of India is designed to redress regional imbalances in development. As of 2012, 272 districts across the country were listed under this scheme. The list includes 21 districts of Jharkhand.

== Education ==
Basantrai CD block had 9 villages with pre-primary schools, 54 villages with primary schools, 21 villages with middle schools, 2 villages with secondary schools, 1 village with senior secondary school, 3 villages with non-formal training centres, 26 villages with no educational facility.
.*Senior secondary schools are also known as Inter colleges in Jharkhand

== Healthcare ==
Basantrai CD block had 11 villages with primary health centres, 21 villages with primary health subcentres, 10 villages with maternity and child welfare centres, 5 villages with TB clinics, 3 villages with allopathic hospitals, 14 villages with dispensaries, 6 villages with veterinary hospitals, 9 villages with family welfare centres, 6 villages with medicine shops.
.*Private medical practitioners, alternative medicine etc. not included
