= Poreyahat Assembly constituency =

Poreyahat
- Constituency No. 16 for the Jharkhand Legislative Assembly

Constituency details
- Country: India
- Region: East India
- State: Jharkhand
- District: Godda
- Established: 2000
- Reservation: None

Member of Legislative Assembly
- 6th Jharkhand Legislative Assembly
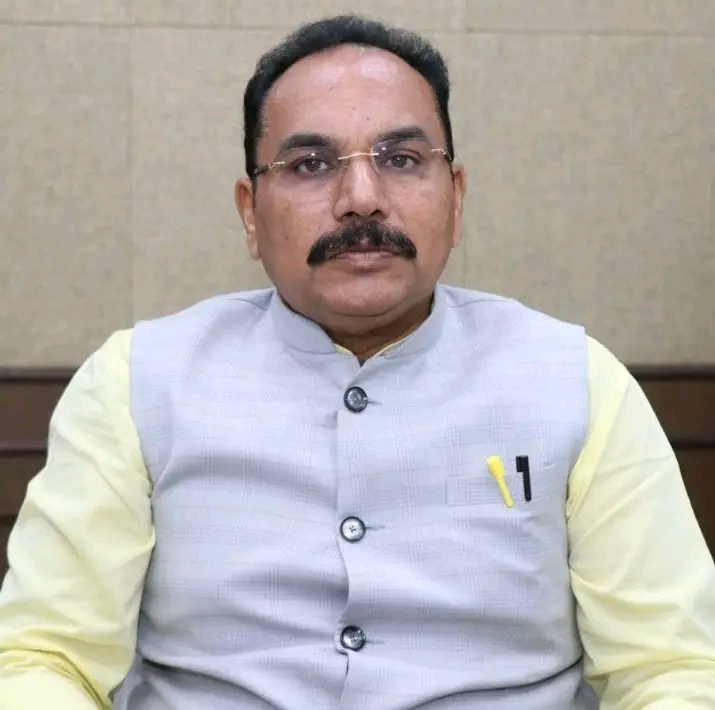
- Incumbent Pradeep Yadav
- Party: INC
- Alliance: MGB
- Elected year: 2024

Poreyahat is an assembly constituency in the Indian state of Jharkhand.

== Overview ==
Poreyahat Assembly constituency covers: Poreyahat Police Station in Godda district, Sarayiahat Police Station in Dumka district and Burhikura, Dammajhilua, Sandmara, Nonbatta, Makhni, Pathra and Punsiya gram panchayats of Godda Police Station in Godda district.

Poreyahat Assembly constituency is part of Godda (Lok Sabha constituency).

== Members of Legislative Assembly ==
Election	Member	Party
Bihar Legislative Assembly
Before 1957: see Poreyahat cum Jarmundi constituency
1957-62: Constituency did not exist
1962	Jadunandan Murmu	Indian National Congress
1967	M. Murmu	Bharatiya Jana Sangh
1969	Edward Marandi	Bihar Prant Hul Jharkhand
1972	Prithwi Chand Kisku	Indian National Congress
1977	Kamlakant Prasad Sinha	Janata Party
1980	Suraj Mandal	Jharkhand Mukti Morcha
1985	Suraj Mandal	Jharkhand Mukti Morcha
1990	Suraj Mandal	Jharkhand Mukti Morcha
1995	Prashant Kumar Mandal	Jharkhand Mukti Morcha
2000	Pradeep Yadav	Bharatiya Janata Party
Jharkhand Legislative Assembly
2003^	Prashant Kumar Mandal	Jharkhand Mukti Morcha
2005	Pradeep Yadav	Bharatiya Janata Party
2009	Pradeep Yadav	Jharkhand Vikas Morcha
2014	Pradeep Yadav	Jharkhand Vikas Morcha
2019	Pradeep Yadav	Jharkhand Vikas Morcha
2024	Pradeep Yadav	Indian National Congress

^by-election

== Election results ==
=== Assembly Election 2024 ===
2024 Jharkhand Legislative Assembly election: Poreyahat
Party	Candidate	Votes	%	±%
INC	Pradeep Yadav	117,842	52.90%	New
BJP	Devendra Nath Singh	83,712	37.58%	▲3.78
Independent	Rajendra Pandit	3,665	1.65%	New
CPI	Ram Chandra Hembrom	3,318	1.49%	New
JLKM	Praveen Kumar	3,316	1.49%	New
BSP	Sanjay Yadav	1,654	0.74%	▼0.13
NOTA	None of the Above	4,761	2.14%	▲0.51
Margin of victory		34,130	15.32%	▲8.11
Turnout		2,22,763	70.26%	▲1.57
Registered electors		3,17,044		▲15.43
INC gain from JVM(P)		Swing	▲11.90	

=== Assembly Election 2019 ===
2019 Jharkhand Legislative Assembly election: Poreyahat
Party	Candidate	Votes	%	±%
JVM(P)	Pradeep Yadav	77,358	41.00%	▲5.49
BJP	Gajadhar Singh	63,761	33.80%	▲4.47
JMM	Ashok Kumar	34,745	18.42%	▼6.39
Independent	Simon Marandi	3,061	1.62%	New
Bharatiya National Janta Dal	Muhammad Ansari	1,833	0.97%	New
Bhartiya Dalit Party	Sanjay Kumar Sinha	1,648	0.87%	New
BSP	Umesh Mishra	1,639	0.87%	▼1.52
NOTA	Nota	3,078	1.63%	▼0.15
Margin of victory		13,597	7.21%	▲1.02
Turnout		1,88,662	68.69%	▲0.17
Registered electors		2,74,662		▲4.37
JVM(P) hold		Swing	▲5.49	

=== Assembly Election 2014 ===
2014 Jharkhand Legislative Assembly election: Poreyahat
Party	Candidate	Votes	%	±%
JVM(P)	Pradeep Yadav	64,036	35.51%	▼12.66
BJP	Devendranath Singh	52,878	29.33%	▲12.00
JMM	Ashok Kumar	44,737	24.81%	▲2.98
BSP	Neebha Jaiswal	4,314	2.39%	New
Independent	Divyandu Shekhar	2,473	1.37%	New
Independent	Kishor Kisku	2,039	1.13%	New
Independent	Dinesh Mandal	1,402	0.78%	New
NOTA	None of the Above	3,210	1.78%	New
Margin of victory		11,158	6.19%	▼20.16
Turnout		1,80,315	68.52%	▲5.15
Registered electors		2,63,155		▲19.72
JVM(P) hold		Swing	▼12.66	

=== Assembly Election 2009 ===
2009 Jharkhand Legislative Assembly election: Poreyahat
Party	Candidate	Votes	%	±%
JVM(P)	Pradeep Yadav	67,105	48.18%	New
JMM	Suraj Mandal	30,401	21.83%	▼13.08
BJP	Prashant Kumar	24,133	17.33%	▼35.23
Loktantrik Samata Dal	Khagendra Prasad Mahto	3,779	2.71%	New
RJD	Buniya Devi	2,655	1.91%	New
Independent	Hemant Kumar Yadav	2,267	1.63%	New
Independent	Lakshmikant Yadav	1,555	1.12%	New
Margin of victory		36,704	26.35%	▲8.70
Turnout		1,39,286	63.37%	▲1.31
Registered electors		2,19,806		▼0.89
JVM(P) gain from BJP		Swing	▼4.38	

=== Assembly Election 2005 ===
2005 Jharkhand Legislative Assembly election: Poreyahat
Party	Candidate	Votes	%	±%
BJP	Pradeep Yadav	72,342	52.56%	▲7.63
JMM	Prashant Kumar	48,050	34.91%	▼10.48
SP	Anand Kumar	3,693	2.68%	New
UGDP	Kundan Kumar Lal	3,344	2.43%	New
BSP	Deolal Hemram	3,242	2.36%	▼1.31
Independent	Sheela Devi Urf Shail Devi	2,116	1.54%	New
AJSU	Lamvodar Darwe	1,280	0.93%	New
Margin of victory		24,292	17.65%	▲17.18
Turnout		1,37,635	62.06%	▼6.69
Registered electors		2,21,773		▲17.46
BJP gain from JMM		Swing	▲7.17	

=== Assembly By-election 2003 ===
2003 Jharkhand Legislative Assembly by-election: Poreyahat
Party	Candidate	Votes	%	±%
JMM	Prashant Kumar	58,924	45.39%	▲16.36
BJP	Ajit Kumar	58,316	44.93%	▲0.99
BSP	B. Prasad Singh	4,755	3.66%	▲2.29
Independent	Sanjeev Mirdha	1,713	1.32%	New
Independent	Karulal Singh	953	0.73%	New
Independent	Srikant Bagwe	942	0.73%	New
Jharkhand Vikas Dal	Aniruddh Sah	858	0.66%	New
Margin of victory		608	0.47%	▼14.43
Turnout		1,29,803	68.75%	▲3.03
Registered electors		1,88,804		▲0.41
JMM gain from BJP		Swing	▲1.46	

=== Assembly Election 2000 ===
2000 Bihar Legislative Assembly election: Poreyahat
Party	Candidate	Votes	%	±%
BJP	Pradeep Yadav	54,287	43.93%	New
JMM	Prashant Kumar	35,874	29.03%	New
INC	Rajesh Kumar Sah	14,083	11.40%	New
RJD	Phani Bhushan Yadav	7,922	6.41%	New
SP	Suraj Mandal	5,158	4.17%	New
CPI	Hem Kant Yadav	3,061	2.48%	New
BSP	Anjani Devi	1,700	1.38%	New
Margin of victory		18,413	14.90%	
Turnout		1,23,567	66.78%	
Registered electors		1,88,025		
BJP win (new seat)				

== See also ==
- Poraiyahat
- Godda (community development block)
- Saraiyahat
