= Mahagama Assembly constituency =

Mahagama
- Constituency No. 18 for the Jharkhand Legislative Assembly

Constituency details
- Country: India
- Region: East India
- State: Jharkhand
- District: Godda
- Lok Sabha constituency: Godda
- Established: 2000
- Reservation: None

Member of Legislative Assembly
- 6th Jharkhand Legislative Assembly
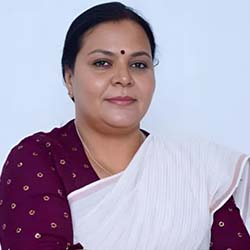
- Incumbent Dipika Pandey Singh
- Party: INC
- Alliance: MGB
- Elected year: 2024

Mahagama is an assembly constituency in the Indian state of Jharkhand.

== Overview ==
Mahagama (Vidhan Sabha constituency) covers: Mahagama and Meherma Police Stations in Godda district.

Mahagama Assembly constituency is part of Godda (Lok Sabha constituency).

== Members of Legislative Assembly ==
Election	Member	Party
Bihar Legislative Assembly
1952	Sagar Mohan Pathak	Indian National Congress
1957	Mahendra Mahto	Praja Socialist Party
1962	Rajpati Ram	Indian National Congress
1967	Rajpati Ram	Indian National Congress
1969	Sayeed Ahmed	Communist Party of India
1972	Awadh Bihari Singh	Bharatiya Jana Sangh
1977	Sayeed Ahmed	Janata Party
1980	Awadh Bihari Singh	Indian National Congress
1985	Awadh Bihari Singh	Indian National Congress
1990	Faiyaz Bhagalpuri	Janata Dal
1995	Awadh Bihari Singh	Indian National Congress
2000	Ashok Kumar	Bharatiya Janata Party
Jharkhand Legislative Assembly
2005	Ashok Kumar	Bharatiya Janata Party
2009	Rajesh Ranjan	Indian National Congress
2014	Ashok Kumar	Bharatiya Janata Party
2019	Dipika Pandey Singh	Indian National Congress
2024	Dipika Pandey Singh	Indian National Congress

== Election results ==
=== Assembly Election 2024 ===
2024 Jharkhand Legislative Assembly election: Mahagama
Party	Candidate	Votes	%	±%
INC	Dipika Pandey Singh	114,069	51.03%	▲5.53
BJP	Ashok Kumar	95,424	42.69%	▲3.57
JLKM	Jawahar Lal Yadav	5,117	2.29%	New
Independent	Md. Harunrasid	2,185	0.98%	New
AIMIM	Mohammad Kamran Khan	1,783	0.80%	▼2.12
NOTA	None of the Above	2,922	1.31%	▲0.44
Margin of victory		18,645	8.34%	▲1.97
Turnout		2,23,545	66.91%	▲1.01
Registered electors		3,34,116		▲12.26
INC hold		Swing	▲5.53	

=== Assembly Election 2019 ===
2019 Jharkhand Legislative Assembly election: Mahagama
Party	Candidate	Votes	%	±%
INC	Deepika Pandey Singh	89,224	45.49%	▲35.32
BJP	Ashok Kumar	76,725	39.12%	▼0.04
AIMIM	Ashok Kumar Singh	5,719	2.92%	New
Independent	Gouri Priya	4,136	2.11%	New
CPI(M)	Ashok Sah	2,703	1.38%	▼4.72
JVM(P)	Sanjiv Kumar Mishra	2,506	1.28%	▼20.39
AJSU	Ataur Rahaman Siddiki	2,198	1.12%	New
NOTA	Nota	1,700	0.87%	▼0.74
Margin of victory		12,499	6.37%	▼11.13
Turnout		1,96,119	65.90%	▲0.46
Registered electors		2,97,621		▲7.97
INC gain from BJP		Swing	▲6.33	

=== Assembly Election 2014 ===
2014 Jharkhand Legislative Assembly election: Mahagama
Party	Candidate	Votes	%	±%
BJP	Ashok Kumar	70,635	39.16%	▲13.83
JVM(P)	Shahid Iqbal	39,075	21.67%	New
INC	Rajesh Ranjan	18,355	10.18%	▼20.98
JMM	Surendra Mohan Keshri	13,770	7.63%	▼1.06
CPI(M)	Ashok Sah	10,998	6.10%	▼0.57
BSP	Jawaharlal Yadav	8,806	4.88%	New
Independent	Sudama Kumar Singh	5,044	2.80%	New
NOTA	None of the Above	2,892	1.60%	New
Margin of victory		31,560	17.50%	▲11.68
Turnout		1,80,359	65.43%	▲8.10
Registered electors		2,75,642		▲12.32
BJP gain from INC		Swing	▲8.01	

=== Assembly Election 2009 ===
2009 Jharkhand Legislative Assembly election: Mahagama
Party	Candidate	Votes	%	±%
INC	Rajesh Ranjan	43,834	31.16%	New
BJP	Ashok Kumar	35,648	25.34%	▼8.15
JMM	Lal Bihari Sah	12,237	8.70%	▲2.06
CPI(M)	Ashok Sah	9,388	6.67%	▲3.89
RJD	Badri Bhagat	7,183	5.11%	▼23.73
Independent	Kunwar Gopal Singh	5,865	4.17%	New
Independent	Saryu Prasad Panjiyara	4,227	3.00%	New
Margin of victory		8,186	5.82%	▲1.16
Turnout		1,40,695	57.33%	▲0.28
Registered electors		2,45,415		▲1.38
INC gain from BJP		Swing	▼2.34	

=== Assembly Election 2005 ===
2005 Jharkhand Legislative Assembly election: Mahagama
Party	Candidate	Votes	%	±%
BJP	Ashok Kumar	46,253	33.49%	▲7.51
RJD	Ataur Rahaman Siddiki	39,825	28.84%	▲11.38
BSP	Ashok Kumar Singh	12,885	9.33%	New
JMM	Pervez Hassan	9,160	6.63%	▼3.25
Independent	Rajesh Ranjan	4,669	3.38%	New
CPI(M)	Ashok Sah	3,843	2.78%	New
Independent	Virendra Kumar Singh	3,151	2.28%	New
Margin of victory		6,428	4.65%	▼3.87
Turnout		1,38,102	57.05%	▼2.79
Registered electors		2,42,063		▲17.51
BJP hold		Swing	▲7.51	

=== Assembly Election 2000 ===
2000 Bihar Legislative Assembly election: Mahagama
Party	Candidate	Votes	%	±%
BJP	Ashok Kumar	32,025	25.98%	New
RJD	Ataur Rahaman Siddiki	21,519	17.46%	New
INC	Awadh Bihari Singh	12,622	10.24%	New
JMM	Virendra Kumar Singh	12,181	9.88%	New
CPI	Suresh Prasad Yadav	12,113	9.83%	New
Independent	Usman Gani	6,786	5.50%	New
Bhartiya Jana Congress (Rashtriya)	Enamul Haque	5,646	4.58%	New
Margin of victory		10,506	8.52%	
Turnout		1,23,273	60.94%	
Registered electors		2,05,995		
BJP win (new seat)				

== See also ==
- Meharama
- Mahagama (community development block)
- Mahagama
