= Rajmahal coalfield =

Coalfield in Jharkhand, India

Rajmahal Coalfield
- Location within Jharkhand
- Location: Jharkhand, India; 25°2′35″N 87°20′39″E
- Products: Power grade coal
- Company: Eastern Coalfields Limited

The Rajmahal Coalfield is a large coalfield located in Jharkhand in eastern India.

== Geography ==
Cities, towns and locations in the Sahibganj, Godda and Pakur districts in Santhal Pargana Division
M: municipality, CT: census town, R: rural/ urban centre, H: historical/ religious/ tourist centre
Owing to space constraints in the small map, the actual locations in a larger map may vary slightly

=== Location ===
Rajmahal coalfield is centred around 25°2′35″N 87°20′39″E.

== Area of Operations ==
Five relatively small coal basins – Hura, Chuperbhita, Pachwara, Mahuagarhi and Brahmani - compose the Rajmahal Coalfields. They form a sort of a broken chain along the western flank of the Rajmahal Hills in the north to West Bengal's Birbhum district in the south. The main advantage of this coalfield is that much of its reserves are untouched. Another description shows the Rajmahal area as being composed of the following: Hura, Gilhuria and Jilbari, Chuparbhita, Pachwara and Brahmani.

== Reserves ==
According to Geological Survey of India, reserves of coal as on 1.1.2004 in Rajmahal Coalfield were 13.13 billion tonnes. It was the third highest reserve in Jharkhand, after Jharia Coalfield (19.4 billion tonnes) and North Karanpura Coalfield (14.6 billion tonnes). While Raniganj Coalfield is the major producer of superior quality non-coking coal, Rajmahal is one of the coalfields that has power-grade coal at shallow depth (up to 300 m).

== Rajmahal open cast and other projects ==
A major coal mining project of Eastern Coalfields Limited (Rajmahal open-cast project, a part of Rajmahal coalfield) is going on in Boarijore, Mahagama and Sunderpahari CD Blocks of Godda district in Jharkhand. Rajmahal open-cast project (earlier known as Lalmatia Colliery) supplies coal to the 2,100 MW Farakka Super Thermal Power Station and the 2,340 MW Kahalgaon Super Thermal Power Station.

As of 2020, major activity is going on near Mahagama town and Lalmatia village. Please see the satellite view of the Google map.

The Rajmahal Opencast project came up in the early 1980s with an annual cpapcity of 5 million tonnes. The capacity was raised to 10.5 million tonnes with Canadian collaboration in 1994. The capacity is being expanded to 17 million tonnes.

EMIL the mining arm of the Aditya Birla Group has been involved in the functioning of Rajmahal Opencast Mines of Eastern Coalfields. Mining operations started in July 2013. It is expected to produce 200 million tonnes of coal over 12.5 years. With the involvement of the Essel Mining and Industries Limited (EMIL) in the Rajmahal Opencast project, supplies to the 2,340 MW Kahalgaon Super Thermal Power Station and the 2,100 MW Farakka Super Thermal Power Station of NTPC were expected to improve.

Simlong and Chatkam collieries and other nearby collieries of Rajmahal coalfield are operated by Eastern Coalfields Limited in Littipara CD block.

Panem Coal operates the Pachhwara Central project with reserves of 562 million tonnes of coal at Panchuara.
