= Godda district =

Coordinates: 24°49′N 87°13′E

- District of Jharkhand
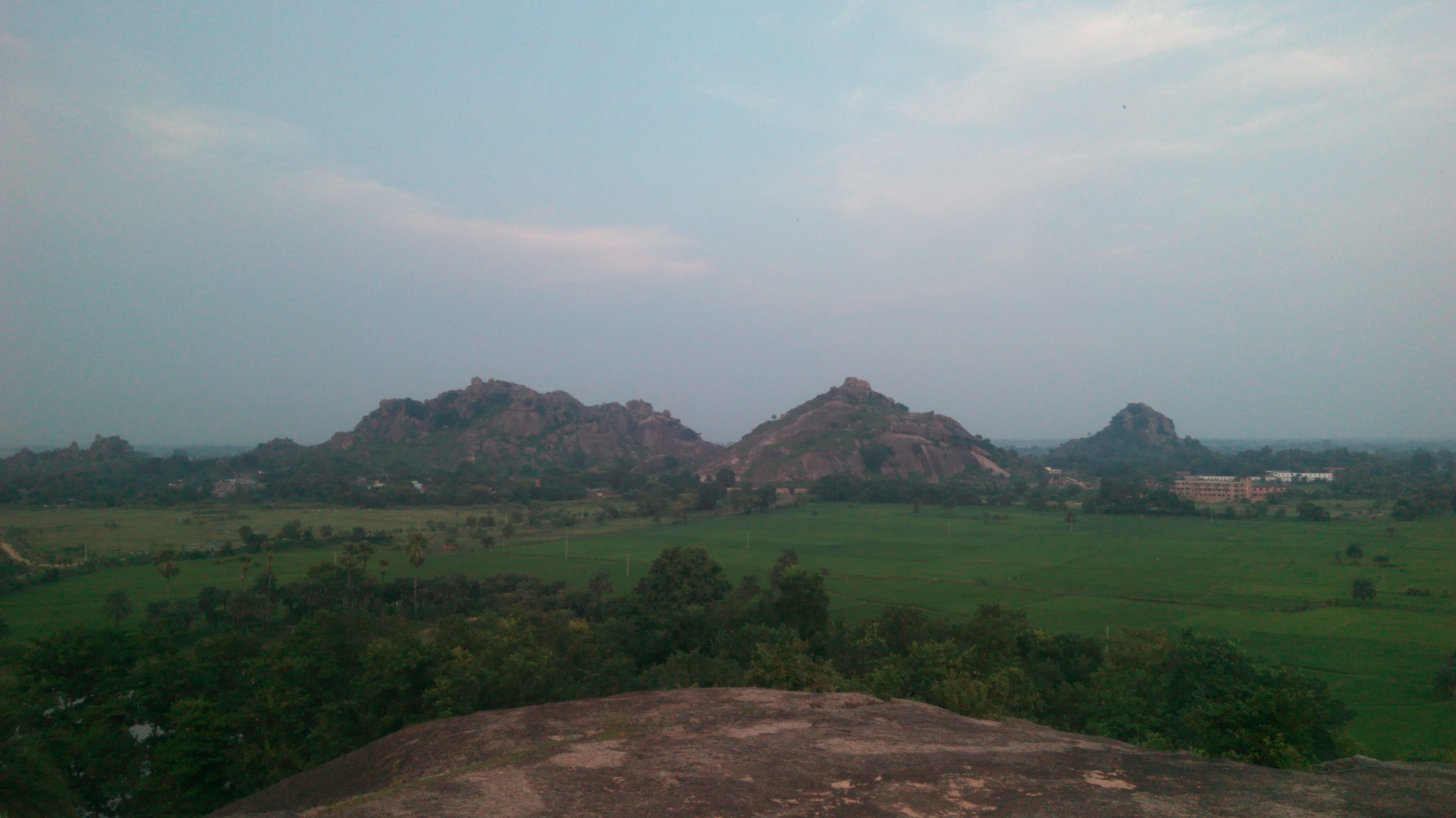
- View of Manokamna Hill in Lakhanpahari
- Interactive map of Godda district
- Country: India
- State: Jharkhand
- Division: Santhal Pargana
- Headquarters: Godda

Government
  - Lok Sabha constituencies: Godda (shared with Deoghar and Dumka districts)
  - Vidhan Sabha constituencies: 3

Area
  - Total: 2,110 km^{2} (810 sq mi)

Population (2011)
  - Total: 1,313,551
  - Density: 623/km^{2} (1,610/sq mi)

Demographics
  - Literacy: 56.40 per cent
  - Sex ratio: 933
- Website: Official website

Godda district is one of the twenty-four districts of Jharkhand state in eastern India. It lies in the north eastern part of the state. The geographical area that now comprises Godda district used to be part of the erstwhile Santhal Parganas district. Godda town is the headquarters of Godda district. The area of the district is 2110 km², with a population of around 1,313,551.

== Economy ==
Godda is mostly famous for the Rajmahal coalfield in Lalmatia. It is an integral part of Jharkhand and is known for its hills and small forests. The mine present here is an integral part of ECL coalfields and is among the biggest in whole Asia.

Until the late 1980s Godda was full of forests and was a remote place far from science and technology and was living in a dark age as other districts of Jharkhand. The entire scenario changed after coal was first discovered in abundance under the Rajmahal Hills by a team of the Geological Survey of India. Central Mine Planning and Design Institute Ltd. conducted a detailed survey of the area. The Rajmahal Opencast Coal mine project was conceived in early 1980s, initially to supply coal to Farakka Super Thermal Power Project of NTPC, with an initial annual capacity of 5 million tonne. For expansion of this coal mine project to 10.5 million tonne per annum, an agreement was signed between Coal India Limited and Canadian Commercial Corporation in January 1989 where MET-CHEM Canada Inc. was designated as the Canadian Executing Agency for implementing the project. The Project was completed in July 1994 and is being run by Eastern Coalfileds Limited personnel. This mine is producing 11.5 million tonne coal per annum. This is being expanded further to 17 million tonne.

Two more opencast coal mine of Eastern Coalfields Limited are coming in Godda district, Chuperbhita opencast coal mine project (capacity - 4 million tonne) and Hurra 'C' opencast coal mine project (capacity - 3 million tonne).

The main economic activity of the people is agriculture, and major crops are paddy, wheat and maize. The district is with rail link of Godda railway station. In 2006 the Indian government named Godda one of the country's 250 most backward districts (out of a total of 640). It is one of the 21 districts in Jharkhand receiving funds from the Backward Regions Grant Fund Programme (BRGF).

== Politics ==
District	No.	Constituency	Name	Party		Alliance	Remarks	Godda	16	Poreyahat	Pradeep Yadav	INC
17	Godda	Sanjay Prasad Yadav		RJD	Cabinet minister			Godda				
18	Mahagama	Dipika Pandey Singh		INC	Cabinet minister			Godda				

== Administration ==
=== Blocks/Mandals ===
Godda district consists of 9 blocks. The following are the list of the blocks in Godda district:

1. Boarijore
2. Godda
3. Mahagama
4. Meharama
5. Pathargama
6. Poraiyahat
7. Sunderpahari
8. Thakurgangti
9. Basantrai.

=== Villages & Panchayats ===
There are 201 panchayats and 1634 villages in the district:

Blocks	No. of Panchayats	No. of Villages
Basantrai	14	82
Boarijor	22	296
Godda	34	196
Mahagama	29	140
Meherma	23	136
Pathargama	19	141
Poreyahat	31	194
Sundarpahari	13	208
Thakurgangti	16	141
Total	201	1634

== Divisions ==
There are three Vidhan Sabha constituencies in this district: Poreyahat, Godda and Mahagama. All of these are part of Godda Lok Sabha constituency.

== Demographics ==
Historical population
Year	Pop.	±% p.a.
1901	348,128	—
1911	362,203	+0.40%
1921	346,047	−0.46%
1931	395,534	+1.35%
1941	431,077	+0.86%
1951	447,976	+0.39%
1961	496,653	+1.04%
1971	600,863	+1.92%
1981	713,405	+1.73%
1991	861,182	+1.90%
2001	1,047,939	+1.98%
2011	1,313,551	+2.28%

Religions in Godda district (2011)
Religion	Percent
Hinduism	71.34%
Islam	22.02%
Sarna	3.58%
Christians	2.88%
Other or not stated	0.18%

CD Block	Hindu %	Muslim %	Other %
Godda	83.44	14.29	2.27
Mahagama	51.72	45.85	2.43
Basantrai	48.79	50.02	1.19
Thakurgangti	72.67	24.35	2.98
Meharama	74.12	22.94	2.94
Pathargama	86.74	9.96	3.40
Poraiyahat	80.69	8.39	10.92
Sunderpahari	76.66	6.65	16.69
Boarijore	58.94	17.48	23.58

According to the 2011 census Godda district has a population of 1,313,551, roughly equal to the nation of Mauritius or the US state of New Hampshire. This gives it a ranking of 372nd in India (out of a total of 640). The district has a population density of 622 inhabitants per square kilometre (1,610/sq mi). Its population growth rate over the decade 2001-2011 was 25.14%. Godda has a sex ratio of 933 females for every 1000 males, and a literacy rate of 56.40%. 4.90% of the population lives in urban areas. Scheduled Castes and Scheduled Tribes make up 8.80% and 21.26% of the population respectively.

Languages of Godda district (2011)
1. 'Other' Hindi (47.7%)
2. Santali (17.7%)
3. Khortha (10.6%)
4. Urdu (8.40%)
5. Hindi (3.47%)
6. Bengali (2.84%)
7. Kurmali (2.83%)
8. Malto (2.19%)
9. Others (4.27%)

At the time of the 2011 Census of India, 17.72% of the population spoke Santali, 10.6% Khortha, 8.40% Urdu, 3.47% Hindi, 2.84% Bengali, 2.83% Kurmali and 2.19% Malto as their first language. 'Others' under Hindi made up 47.68% of the population. The local dialect is Angika.
