= Maheshpur =

Maheshpur (literally, "the city of Mahesh") may refer to any of the following places:

== In Bangladesh ==
- Maheshpur Upazila, Jhenaidah, Khulna

== In India ==
- Maheshpur, Bihar, a village in Champaran
- Maheshpur, Lakhisarai district, a village in Bihar
- Maheshpur, Munger, a village in Bihar
- Maheshpur block, Jharkhand
- Maheshpur Raj, Jharkhand
- Maheshpur, Pakur, a village in Jharkhand
- Maheshpur, Malda, a village in West Bengal

== In Nepal ==
- Maheshpur, Mechi
- Maheshpur, Narayani
- Maheshpur Gamharia
- Maheshpur Patari

== See also ==
- Maheshpur (Vidhan Sabha constituency)
