= Kumarpur =

- Census Town
- Location in Jharkhand, India Kumarpur (India)
- Coordinates: 24.685333°N 87.842289°E
- Country: India
- State: Jharkhand
- District: Pakur

Area
  - Total: 4.03 km^{2} (1.56 sq mi)

Population (2011)
  - Total: 7,153
  - Density: 1,770/km^{2} (4,600/sq mi)

Languages (*For language details see Pakur block#Language and religion)
  - Official: Hindi, Urdu
- Time zone: UTC+5:30 (IST)
- PIN: 814111
- Telephone/ STD code: 06427
- Lok Sabha constituency: Rajmahal
- Vidhan Sabha constituency: Litipara
- Website: pakur.nic.in

Kumarpur is a census town in Pakur CD block in Pakur subdivision of Pakur district in the Indian state of Jharkhand.

== Geography ==
Cities, towns and locations in the Sahibganj, Godda and Pakur districts in Santhal Pargana Division
M: municipality, CT: census town, R: rural/ urban centre, H: historical/ religious/ tourist centre
Owing to space constraints in the small map, the actual locations in a larger map may vary slightly

=== Location ===
Kumarpur is located at 24.685333°N 87.842289°E.

Kumarpur has an area of 4.03 square kilometres (1.56 sq mi).

=== Overview ===
The map shows a hilly area with the Rajmahal hills running from the bank of the Ganges in the extreme north to the south, beyond the area covered by the map into Dumka district. ‘Farakka’ is marked on the map and that is where Farakka Barrage is, just inside West Bengal. Rajmahal coalfield is shown in the map. The entire area is overwhelmingly rural with only small pockets of urbanisation.

Note: The full screen map has a level of interactivity. Each location marked on the map contains links between pages.

== Demographics ==
According to the 2011 Census of India, Kumarpur had a total population of 7,153, of which 3,519 (49%) were males and 3,634 (51%) were females. Population in the age range 0–6 years was 1,742. The total number of literate persons in Kumarpur was 1,581 (29.22% of the population over 6 years).

== Infrastructure ==
According to the District Census Handbook 2011, Pakur, Kumarpur covered an area of 4.03 km^{2}. Among the civic amenities, it had 10 km roads with open drains, the protected water supply involved hand pump, covered well. It had 199 domestic electric connections. Among the educational facilities it had 1 primary school, 1 middle school, other educational facilities at Pakur 5 km away. Two important commodities it manufactured were bidi, stone. It had the branch offices of 1 nationalised bank, 1 cooperative bank, 1 agricultural credit society, 1 non-agricultural credit society.

== Economy ==
Kumarpur is in the heart of the Pakur black stone mining area.

== Transport ==
Tilbhita railway station on the Sahibganj loop is located nearby.
