= Sagarmpur =

Sangrampur Sangarmpur
- Census Town
- Location in Jharkhand, India Sangrampur (India)
- Coordinates: 24.670333°N 87.848689°E
- Country: India
- State: Jharkhand
- District: Pakur

Area
  - Total: 4.03 km^{2} (1.56 sq mi)

Population (2011)
  - Total: 7,153
  - Density: 1,770/km^{2} (4,600/sq mi)

Languages (*For language details see Pakur block#Language and religion)
  - Official: Hindi, Urdu
- Time zone: UTC+5:30 (IST)
- PIN: 814111
- Telephone/ STD code: 06427
- Lok Sabha constituency: Rajmahal
- Vidhan Sabha constituency: Litipara
- Website: pakur.nic.in

Sangrampur (also spelled Sangrampur) is a census town in Pakur CD block in Pakur subdivision of Pakur district in the Indian state of Jharkhand.

== Geography ==
Cities, towns and locations in the Sahibganj, Godda and Pakur districts in Santhal Pargana Division
M: municipality, CT: census town, R: rural/ urban centre, H: historical/ religious/ tourist centre
Owing to space constraints in the small map, the actual locations in a larger map may vary slightly

=== Location ===
Sagrampur is located at 24.670333°N 87.848689°E.

Sagrampur has an area of 2.66 square kilometres (1.03 sq mi).

=== Overview ===
The map shows a hilly area with the Rajmahal hills running from the bank of the Ganges in the extreme north to the south, beyond the area covered by the map into Dumka district. ‘Farakka’ is marked on the map and that is where Farakka Barrage is, just inside West Bengal. Rajmahal coalfield is shown in the map. The entire area is overwhelmingly rural with only small pockets of urbanisation.

Note: All marked locations on the interactive map above are hyperlinked and can be clicked on to go to different pages.

== Demographics ==
According to the 2011 Census of India, Sagrampur had a total population of 6,184, of which 2,990 (48%) were males and 3,194 (52%) were females. Population in the age range 0–6 years was 1,382. The total number of literate persons in Sagrampur was 1,794 (37.36% of the population over 6 years).

== Infrastructure ==
According to the District Census Handbook 2011, Pakur, Sagarmpur covered an area of 2.66 km^{2}. Among the civic amenities, it had 8 km roads with open drains, the protected water supply involved hand pump, tubewell/ borewell, overhead tank. It had 330 domestic electric connections. Among the educational facilities it had 1 primary school, 1 middle school, other educational facilities at Pakur 5 km away. An important commodity it manufactured was bidi. It had the branch offices of 1 nationalised bank, 1 cooperative bank.

== Transport ==
Tilbhita railway station on the Sahibganj loop is located nearby.
