= Raghunandanpur =

- Census Town
- Location in Jharkhand, India Raghunandanpur (India)
- Coordinates: 24.638333°N 87.883889°E
- Country: India
- State: Jharkhand
- District: Pakur

Area
  - Total: 0.82 km^{2} (0.32 sq mi)

Population (2011)
  - Total: 8,335
  - Density: 10,000/km^{2} (26,000/sq mi)

Languages (*For language details see Pakur block#Language and religion)
  - Official: Hindi, Urdu
- Time zone: UTC+5:30 (IST)
- PIN: 814111
- Telephone/ STD code: 06427
- Lok Sabha constituency: Rajmahal
- Vidhan Sabha constituency: Litipara
- Website: pakur.nic.in

Raghunandanpur is a census town in Pakur CD block in Pakur subdivision of Pakur district in the Indian state of Jharkhand.

== Geography ==
Cities, towns and locations in the Sahibganj, Godda and Pakur districts in Santhal Pargana Division
M: municipality, CT: census town, R: rural/ urban centre, H: historical/ religious/ tourist centre
Owing to space constraints in the small map, the actual locations in a larger map may vary slightly

=== Location ===
Raghunandanpur is located at 24.638333°N 87.883889°E.

Raghunandanpur has an area of 0.82 square kilometres (0.32 sq mi).

=== Overview ===
The map shows a hilly area with the Rajmahal hills running from the bank of the Ganges in the extreme north to the south, beyond the area covered by the map into Dumka district. ‘Farakka’ is marked on the map and that is where Farakka Barrage is, just inside West Bengal. Rajmahal coalfield is shown in the map. The entire area is overwhelmingly rural with only small pockets of urbanisation.

Note: All places marked on the map are linked and you can move on to another page of your choice. Try opening the map in full screen to see what else is there – one gets railway links, many more road links and so on.

== Demographics ==
According to the 2011 Census of India, Raghunandanpur had a total population of 8,335, of which 4,248 (51%) were males and 4,087 (49%) were females. Population in the age range 0–6 years was 1,903. The total number of literate persons in Raghunandanpur was 3,312 (51.49% of the population over 6 years).

== Infrastructure ==
According to the District Census Handbook 2011, Pakur, Raghunandanpur covered an area of 0.82 km^{2}. Among the civic amenities, it had 8 km roads with open drains, the protected water supply involved hand pump, tubewell/ borewell, overhead tank. It had 737 domestic electric connections. Among the educational facilities it had 1 primary school, 1 middle school, other educational facilities at Pakur 3 km away. An important commodity it manufactured was bidi. It had the branch office of 1 nationalised bank.
