= Panchuara =

Village in Jharkhand, India

Panchuara Pachhwara
- Village
- Panchuara village photo

- Location in Jharkhand, India Panchuara (India)
- Coordinates: 24.534667°N 87.504722°E
- Country: India
- State: Jharkhand
- District: Pakur

Area
  - Total: 1,325.16 km^{2} (511.65 sq mi)

Population (2011)
  - Total: 2,958
  - Density: 2.232/km^{2} (5.781/sq mi)

Languages (*For language details see Amrapara block#Language and religion)
  - Official: Hindi, Urdu
- Time zone: UTC+5:30 (IST)
- PIN: 814111
- Telephone/ STD code: 06427
- Lok Sabha constituency: Rajmahal
- Vidhan Sabha constituency: Litipara
- Website: pakur.nic.in

Panchuara (also known as Pachhwara) is a village in Amrapara CD block in Pakur subdivision of Pakur district in the Indian state of Jharkhand.

== Geography ==
Cities, towns and locations in the Sahibganj, Godda and Pakur districts in Santhal Pargana Division
M: municipality, CT: census town, R: rural/ urban centre, H: historical/ religious/ tourist centre
Owing to space constraints in the small map, the actual locations in a larger map may vary slightly

=== Location ===
Panchuara is located at 24.534667°N 87.504722°E.

Panchuara has an area of 1,325.16 hectares (3,274.5 acres).

=== Overview ===
The map shows a hilly area with the Rajmahal hills running from the bank of the Ganges in the extreme north to the south, beyond the area covered by the map into Dumka district. ‘Farakka’ is marked on the map and that is where Farakka Barrage is, just inside West Bengal. Rajmahal coalfield is shown in the map. The entire area is overwhelmingly rural with only small pockets of urbanisation.

== Demographics ==
According to the 2011 Census of India, Panchuara had a total population of 2,958, of which 1,486 (50%) were males and 1,472 (50%) were females. Population in the age range 0–6 years was 609. The total number of literate persons in Panchuara was 2,349 (50.62% of the population over 6 years).

== Economy ==
Panem Coal, a joint venture of Punjab State Power Corporation and Eastern Minerals and Trading Agency (EMTA), operates the Pachhwara Central project. It is estimated that Pachhwara Central block has reserves of 562 million tonnes of coal. It is a part of the Rajmahal coalfield. An open cast mine has been developed across 11 square kilometres (4.2 sq mi). It supplies coal to three power pants in Punjab. Jharkhand state government earns a royalty of around Rs. 100 crores annually. The operations have displaced 250 families. The project began in 2002 and ran into trouble when the Santhal community inhabiting the area were pushed off their land. Sister Valsa John, an Indian nun, organised the Santhals to demand compensation for their land for the project. Ultimately Panem Coal was forced into a compensation agreement. However, Sister Valsa was beaten and hacked to death by a mob in 2011.
