= Littipara block =

Littipara
- Community development block
- Location in Jharkhand, India
- Coordinates: 24°41′41.9″N 87°37′1″E
- Country: India
- State: Jharkhand
- District: Pakur

Government
  - Type: Federal democracy

Area
  - Total: 412.95 km^{2} (159.44 sq mi)
- Elevation: 30 m (98 ft)

Population (2011)
  - Total: 105,701
  - Density: 255.97/km^{2} (662.95/sq mi)

Languages
  - Official: Hindi, Urdu
  - Regional: Santhali, Malto

Literacy (2011)
  - Total literates: 34,099 (40.70%)
- Time zone: UTC+5:30 (IST)
- PIN: 816102
- Telephone/STD code: 06435
- Vehicle registration: JH-16
- Lok Sabha constituency: Rajmahal
- Vidhan Sabha constituency: Litipara
- Website: pakur.nic.in

Littipara is a community development block that forms an administrative division in the Pakur subdivision of the Pakur district, Jharkhand state, India.

== Geography ==
Litipara, the eponymous CD block headquarters, is located at 24°41′41.9″N 87°37′1″E.

It is located 28 km from Pakur, the district headquarters.

A predominantly hilly area, Pakur district has pockets of plain land. A long but narrow stretch between the Farakka Feeder Canal, located outside the district, and the Sahibganj loop line is very fertile. The Littipara and Amrapara CD blocks are largely covered by the Rajmahal hills. The rest of the district is rolling uplands. The district, once famous for its forests, have lost all of it, except a few hill tops in the Damin-i-koh area.

Littipara CD block is bounded by Barhait and Pathna CD blocks in Sahibganj district on the north, Hiranpur CD block on the east, Amrapara CD block on the south, and Sunderpahari CD block in Godda district on the east.

Littipara CD block has an area of 412.95 km^{2}.Litipara police station serves this block. Headquarters of this CD block is at Litipara village.

== Demographics ==
=== Population ===
According to the 2011 Census of India, Littipara CD block had a total population of 106,701, all of which were rural. There were 52,850 (50%) males and 52,851 (50%) females. Population in the age range 0–6 years was 21,919. Scheduled Castes numbered 2,412 (2.28%) and Scheduled Tribes numbered 76,352 (72.23%).

In 2011, Litipara (village) had a population of 2,294.

=== Literacy ===
As of the 2011 census, the total number of literate persons in Litipara CD block was 34,099 (40.70% of the population over 6 years) out of which 21,247 (62%) were males and 12,852 (38%) were females. The gender disparity (the difference between female and male literacy rates) was 24%.

See also – List of Jharkhand districts ranked by literacy rate

Literacy in CD Blocks of
Pakur district
Littipara – 40.70%
Amrapara – 46.55%
Hiranpur – 51.95%
Pakur – 51.95%
Maheshpur – 52.34%
Pakuria – 53.82%
Source: 2011 Census: CD Block Wise
Primary Census Abstract Data

=== Language and religion ===
Religions in Littipara CD block (2011)
Religion	Percent
Hinduism	52.13%
Christianity	24.66%
Islam	11.58%
Others*	11.17%
Other or not stated	0.46%
*mainly tribal religions like Sarna

Hindi is the official language in Jharkhand and Urdu has been declared as an additional official language.

In the 2001 census, Hindus constituted 47.79%, Christians 14.90% and Muslims 10.98% of the population in Littipara CD block. In the district as a whole, Hindus constituted 44.45%, Muslims 32.74% and Christians 6.01% of the population. The percentage of scheduled tribes in the population of Littipara CD block was 71.68%. In the district as a whole scheduled tribes constituted 44.59% of the population. Around 85% of the tribal population was composed of Santhals. There are two primitive groups – Mal Paharias and Sauria Paharias.

Languages of Littipara CD block (2011)
1. Santali (50.3%)
2. Malto (21.5%)
3. Khortha (14.5%)
4. Bengali (6.78%)
5. Urdu (3.57%)
6. Hindi (1.26%)
7. Others (2.04%)

At the time of the 2011 census, 50.34% of the population spoke Santali, 21.47% Malto, 14.54% Khortha, 6.78% Bengali, 3.57% Urdu and 1.26% Hindi as their first language.

== Rural poverty ==
50-60% of the population of Pakur district were in the BPL category in 2004–2005, being in the same category as Sahebganj, Deoghar and Garhwa districts. Rural poverty in Jharkhand declined from 66% in 1993–94 to 46% in 2004–05. In 2011, it has come down to 39.1%.

== Economy ==
=== Livelihood ===
Livelihood
in Littipara CD block
1. Cultivators (38.6%)
2. Agricultural labourers (47.9%)
3. Household industries (3.35%)
4. Other Workers (10.2%)

In Littipara CD block in 2011, amongst the class of total workers, cultivators numbered 19,907 and formed 38.56%, agricultural labourers numbered 24,733 and formed 47.90%, household industry workers numbered 1,728 and formed 3.35% and other workers numbered 5,264 and formed 10.20%. Total workers numbered 51,632 and formed 48.35% of the total population. Non-workers numbered 54,069 and formed 51.15% of total population.

Note: In the census records a person is considered a cultivator, if the person is engaged in cultivation/ supervision of land owned. When a person who works on another person's land for wages in cash or kind or share, is regarded as an agricultural labourer. Household industry is defined as an industry conducted by one or more members of the family within the household or village, and one that does not qualify for registration as a factory under the Factories Act. Other workers are persons engaged in some economic activity other than cultivators, agricultural labourers and household workers. It includes factory, mining, plantation, transport and office workers, those engaged in business and commerce, teachers and entertainment artistes.

=== Infrastructure ===
There are 275 inhabited villages in Littipara CD block. In 2011, 15 villages had power supply. 27 villages had tap water (treated/ untreated), 255 villages had well water (covered/ uncovered), 209 villages had hand pumps, and all villages had drinking water facility. 12 villages had post offices, 2 villages had sub post offices, 5 villages had telephones (land lines), 6 villages had public call offices and 54 villages had mobile phone coverage. 258 villages had pucca (paved) village roads, 34 villages had bus service (public/ private), 3 villages had autos/ modified autos, 4 villages had taxis/ vans, 37 villages had tractors, 7 villages had navigable waterways. 6 villages had bank branches, 2 villages had ATMs, 3 villages had agricultural credit societies, 20 villages had cinema/ video halls, 11 villages had public libraries, public reading room. 50 villages had public distribution system, 21 villages had weekly haat (market) and 12 villages had assembly polling stations.

=== Coal mining ===
Simlong and Chatkam collieries and other nearby collieries of Rajmahal coalfield are operated by Eastern Coalfields Limited in Littipara CD block.

Simlong Colliery of Eastern Coalfields, in the Cupperbhitta basin of the Rajmahal coalfield, has a rated capacity of 2 million tonnes per year and a peak capacity of 2.3 million tonnes per year. Total mineable reserves are 38.80 million tonnes and, as of 2015–16, the project was expected to have a life of 26 year.

=== Agriculture ===
Pakur is predominantly a hilly district. There is a narrow fertile alluvial tract bordering the Ganges Feeder Canal. While the hills stretch from the north to the south-east, the rest is rolling area, which is less conducive to agricultural operations than the alluvial strip. The net sown area of the district is around 28%. Thus though the district is predominantly agricultural it offers only limited opportunities to the people. Many people from the district migrate to the neighbouring districts of West Bengal during the agricultural seasons. In Littipara CD block, 18.97% of the total area is cultivable area and 3.56% of the cultivable area is irrigated area.

=== Backward Regions Grant Fund ===
Pakur district is listed as a backward region and receives financial support from the Backward Regions Grant Fund. The fund created by the Government of India is designed to redress regional imbalances in development. As of 2012, 272 districts across the country were listed under this scheme. The list includes 21 districts of Jharkhand.

== Education ==
Littipara CD block had 26 villages with pre-primary schools, 172 villages with primary schools, 50 villages with middle schools, 2 villages with secondary schools, 2 villages with senior secondary schools, 100 villages with no educational facility.
.*Senior secondary schools are also known as Inter colleges in Jharkhand

== Healthcare ==
Littipara CD block had 2 villages with primary health centres, 22 villages with primary health subcentres, 4 village with maternity and child welfare centre, 2 villages with TB clinics, 6 villages with allopathic hospitals, 7 villages with dispensaries, 2 villages with veterinary hospitals, 3 villages with family welfare centres, 9 villages with medicine shops.
.*Private medical practitioners, alternative medicine etc. not included
