= Hiranpur block =

Hiranpur
- Community development block
- Location in Jharkhand, India
- Coordinates: 24°42′22″N 87°42′16″E
- Country: India
- State: Jharkhand
- District: Pakur

Government
  - Type: Federal democracy

Area
  - Total: 170.51 km^{2} (65.83 sq mi)
- Elevation: 30 m (98 ft)

Population (2011)
  - Total: 84,079
  - Density: 493.10/km^{2} (1,277.1/sq mi)

Languages
  - Official: Hindi, Urdu

Literacy (2011)
  - Total literates: 35,137 (51.95%)
- Time zone: UTC+5:30 (IST)
- PIN: 816104 (Hiranpur)
- Telephone/STD code: 06435
- Vehicle registration: JH-16
- Lok Sabha constituency: Rajmahal
- Vidhan Sabha constituency: Litipara
- Website: pakur.nic.in

Hiranpur is a community development block that forms an administrative division in the Pakur subdivision of the Pakur district, Jharkhand state, India.

== Geography ==
Hiranpur, the eponymous CD block headquarters, is located at 24°42′22″N 87°42′16″E.

It is located 19 km from Pakur, the district headquarters.

A predominantly hilly area, Pakur district has pockets of plain land. A long but narrow stretch between the Farakka Feeder Canal, located outside the district, and the Sahibganj loop line is very fertile. The Littipara and Amrapara CD blocks are largely covered by the Rajmahal hills. The rest of the district is rolling uplands. The district, once famous for its forests, have lost all of it, except a few hill tops in the Damin-i-koh area.

Hiranpur CD block is bounded by Barharwa CD block in Sahibganj district on the north, Pakur CD block on the east, Mahespur CD block on the south, and Littipara CD block on the west.

Hiranpur CD block has an area of 170.51 km^{2}.Hiranpur police station serves this block. Headquarters of this CD block is at Hiranpur village.

== Demographics ==
=== Population ===
According to the 2011 Census of India, Hiranpur CD block had a total population of 84,079, all of which were rural. There were 42,506 (51%) males and 41,573 (49%) females. Population in the age range 0–6 years was 16,439. Scheduled Castes numbered 4,186 (4.98%) and Scheduled Tribes numbered 33,195 (39.48%).

In 2011, Hiranpur Khas had a population of 1,135. There are several villages surrounding it (2011 population in brackets): Hat Kathi (3,747), Sundarpur (2,611), Baramasia (1,423) and Ranipur (766).

=== Literacy ===
As of 2011 census, the total number of literate persons in Hiranpur CD block was 35,137 (51.95% of the population over 6 years) out of which 21,491 (61%) were males and 13,646 (39%) were females. The gender disparity (the difference between female and male literacy rates) was 22%.

See also – List of Jharkhand districts ranked by literacy rate

Literacy in CD Blocks of
Pakur district
Littipara – 40.70%
Amrapara – 46.55%
Hiranpur – 51.95%
Pakur – 51.95%
Maheshpur – 52.34%
Pakuria – 53.82%
Source: 2011 Census: CD Block Wise
Primary Census Abstract Data

=== Language and religion ===
Religions in Hiranpur CD block (2011)
Religion	Percent
Hinduism	56.92%
Islam	27.35%
Christianity	8.76%
Others*	6.71%
Other or not stated	0.35%
*mainly tribal religions like Sarna

In 2001 census, Hindus constituted 57.22%, Muslims 25.09% and Christians 6.35% of the population in Hiranpur CD block. In the district as a whole, Hindus constituted 44.45%, Muslims 32.74% and Christians 6.01% of the population. The percentage of scheduled tribes in the population of Hiranpur CD block was 41.42%. In the district as a whole, scheduled tribes constituted 44.59% of the population. Around 85% of the tribal population was composed of Santhals. There are two primitive groups – Mal Paharias and Sauria Paharias.

Languages of Hiranpur CD block (2011)
1. Santali (35.4%)
2. Khortha (33.2%)
3. Bengali (14.1%)
4. Urdu (9.04%)
5. Malto (3.92%)
6. Hindi (1.94%)
7. Bhojpuri (1.33%)
8. Others (1.10%)

At the time of the 2011 census, 35.35% of the population spoke Santali, 33.20% Khortha, 14.12% Bengali, 9.04% Urdu, 3.92% Malto, 1.94% Hindi and 1.33% Bhojpuri as their first language.

== Rural poverty ==
50-60% of the population of Pakur district were in the BPL category in 2004–2005, being in the same category as Sahebganj, Deoghar and Garhwa districts. Rural poverty in Jharkhand declined from 66% in 1993–94 to 46% in 2004–05. In 2011, it has come down to 39.1%.

== Economy ==
=== Livelihood ===
Livelihood
in Hiranpur CD block
1. Cultivators (29.9%)
2. Agricultural labourers (51.8%)
3. Household industries (2.44%)
4. Other Workers (15.9%)

In Hiranpur CD block in 2011, amongst the class of total workers, cultivators numbered 11,729 and formed 29.87%, agricultural labourers numbered 20,351 and formed 51.82%, household industry workers numbered 959 and formed 2.44% and other workers numbered 6,233 and formed 15.87%. Total workers numbered 39,272 and formed 46.71% of the total population. Non-workers numbered 44,807 and formed 56.29% of total population.

Note: In the census records a person is considered a cultivator, if the person is engaged in cultivation/ supervision of land owned. When a person who works on another person's land for wages in cash or kind or share, is regarded as an agricultural labourer. Household industry is defined as an industry conducted by one or more members of the family within the household or village, and one that does not qualify for registration as a factory under the Factories Act. Other workers are persons engaged in some economic activity other than cultivators, agricultural labourers and household workers. It includes factory, mining, plantation, transport and office workers, those engaged in business and commerce, teachers and entertainment artistes.

=== Infrastructure ===
There are 119 inhabited villages in Hiranpur CD block. In 2011, 39 villages had power supply. 1 village had tap water (treated/ untreated), 113 villages had well water (covered/ uncovered), 119 villages had hand pumps, and all villages had drinking water facility. 13 villages had post offices, 5 villages had sub post offices, 2 villages had telephones (land lines), 11 villages had public call offices and 26 villages had mobile phone coverage. 108 villages had pucca (paved) village roads, 19 villages had bus service (public/ private), 8 villages had autos/ modified autos, 12 villages had taxis/ vans, 18 villages had tractors. 3 villages had bank branches, 1 village had ATM, 10 villages had cinema/ video halls, 7 villages had public libraries, public reading room. 31 villages had public distribution system, 13 villages had weekly haat (market) and 4 villages had assembly polling stations.

=== Agriculture ===
Pakur is predominantly a hilly district. There is a narrow fertile alluvial tract bordering the Ganges Feeder Canal. While the hills stretch from the north to the south-east, the rest is rolling area, which is less conducive to agricultural operations than the alluvial strip. The net sown area of the district is around 28%. Thus though the district is predominantly agricultural it offers only limited opportunities to the people. Many people from the district migrate to the neighbouring districts of West Bengal during the agricultural seasons. In Hiranpur CD block 30.54% of the total area is cultivable area and 11.83% of the cultivable area is irrigated area.

=== Stone chips industry ===
Pakur is a centre of mining of black stone which is in great demand in the construction industry. There are four circles for mining of stone – Pakur, Hiranpur, Mahespur and Pakuria. Stone chips are mined in Hiranpur circle at villages such as Anguthia, Belpahari, Bhandaro, Bishanpur, Dharni Pahar, Dhowapahar, Fatehpur, Ganeshpur, Hathigarh, Harinduba, Jiyajori, Karanpura, Maharo, Mansighpur, Murgadanga, Pipaljoria, Pokharia, Pratappur, Ramakura, Rani Kola, Rajipur, Shiwlidanga, Silpahari, Suraidanga, Shaharpur, Talpahari and Vanpohira.

=== Backward Regions Grant Fund ===
Pakur district is listed as a backward region and receives financial support from the Backward Regions Grant Fund. The fund created by the Government of India is designed to redress regional imbalances in development. As of 2012, 272 districts across the country were listed under this scheme. The list includes 21 districts of Jharkhand.

== Education ==
Hiranpur CD block had 15 villages with pre-primary schools, 85 villages with primary schools, 29 villages with middle schools, 2 villages with secondary schools, 3 villages with senior secondary schools, 32 villages with no educational facility.
.*Senior secondary schools are also known as Inter colleges in Jharkhand

== Healthcare ==
Hiranpur CD block had 2 villages with primary health centres, 11 villages with primary health subcentres, 1 village with maternity and child welfare centre, 1 village with allopathic hospital, 1 village with dispensary, 1 village with family welfare centre, 1 village with medicine shop.
.*Private medical practitioners, alternative medicine etc. not included
