= Amrapara =

Village in Pakur (Jharkhand), India

- Village
- Amrapara

- Location in Jharkhand, India Amrapara (India)
- Coordinates: 24.521367°N 87.571722°E
- Country: India
- State: Jharkhand
- District: Pakur

Population (2011)
  - Total: 3,898

Languages (*For language details see Amrapara block#Language and religion)
  - Official: Hindi, Urdu
- Time zone: UTC+5:30 (IST)
- PIN: 814111
- Telephone/ STD code: 06427
- Vehicle registration: JH 16
- Lok Sabha constituency: Rajmahal
- Vidhan Sabha constituency: Litipara
- Website: pakur.nic.in

Amrapara is a village in Amrapara CD block in Pakur subdivision of Pakur district in the Indian state of Jharkhand.

== Geography ==
Cities, towns and locations in the Sahibganj, Godda and Pakur districts in Santhal Pargana Division
M: municipality, CT: census town, R: rural/ urban centre, H: historical/ religious/ tourist centre
Owing to space constraints in the small map, the actual locations in a larger map may vary slightly

=== Location ===
Amrapara is located at 24.521367°N 87.571722°E.

Amrapara has an area of 365 hectares (900 acres).

=== Overview ===
The map shows a hilly area with the Rajmahal hills running from the bank of the Ganges in the extreme north to the south, beyond the area covered by the map into Dumka district. ‘Farakka’ is marked on the map and that is where Farakka Barrage is, just inside West Bengal. Rajmahal coalfield is shown in the map. The entire area is overwhelmingly rural with only small pockets of urbanisation.

Note: All places marked on the full screen map are linked and you can swiftly move on to another page of your choice. Enlarge the map to see what else is linked, there are some railway links, road links and more.

== Demographics ==
According to the 2011 Census of India, Amrapara had a total population of 3,898, of which 1,984 (51%) were males and 1,914 (49%) were females. Population in the age range 0–6 years was 626. The total number of literate persons in Amrapara was 2,293 (70.08% of the population over 6 years).

== Civic administration ==
=== Police station ===
Amrapara police station serves Amrapara CD block.

=== CD block HQ ===
Headquarters of Amrapara CD block is at Amrapara village.

== Education ==
Rajkiyakrit High School is a Hindi-medium coeducational institution established in 1949. It has facilities for teaching from class IX to class XII.

Model School Amrapara is an English-medium coeducational institution established in 2012. It has facilities for teaching from class VI to class XII.

Project High School Amrapara is a Hindi-medium girls only institution established in 1950. It has facilities for teaching from class VIII to class X.
