= Litipara =

- Village
- Location in Jharkhand, India Litipara (India)
- Coordinates: 24.694972°N 87.616944°E
- Country: India
- State: Jharkhand
- District: Pakur

Population (2011)
  - Total: 2,294

Languages (*For language details see Littipara block#Language and religion)
  - Official: Hindi, Urdu
- Time zone: UTC+5:30 (IST)
- PIN: 816102
- Telephone/ STD code: 06435
- Vehicle registration: JH 16
- Lok Sabha constituency: Rajmahal
- Vidhan Sabha constituency: Litipara
- Website: pakur.nic.in

Litipara is a village in Littipara CD block in Pakur subdivision of Pakur district in the Indian state of Jharkhand.

== Geography ==
Cities, towns and locations in the Sahibganj, Godda and Pakur districts in Santhal Pargana Division
M: municipality, CT: census town, R: rural/ urban centre, H: historical/ religious/ tourist centre
Owing to space constraints in the small map, the actual locations in a larger map may vary slightly

=== Location ===
Litipara is located at 24.694972°N 87.616944°E.

Litipara has an area of 461 hectares (1,140 acres).

=== Overview ===
The map shows a hilly area with the Rajmahal hills running from the bank of the Ganges in the extreme north to the south, beyond the area covered by the map into Dumka district. ‘Farakka’ is marked on the map and that is where Farakka Barrage is, just inside West Bengal. Rajmahal coalfield is shown in the map. The entire area is overwhelmingly rural with only small pockets of urbanisation.

The area is served by local road networks and regional railway lines connecting the surrounding settlements.

== Demographics ==
According to the 2011 Census of India, Litipara had a total population of 2,294, of which 1,185 (52%) were males and 1,109 (51%) were females. Population in the age range 0–6 years was 309. The total number of literate persons in Litipara was 1,244 (62.67% of the population over 6 years).

== Civic administration ==
=== Police station ===
Litipara police station serves Littipara CD block.

=== CD block HQ ===
Headquarters of Littipara CD block is at Litipara village.

== Education ==
Rajyakrit High School Littipara is a Hindi-medium coeducational institution established in 1971. It has facilities for teaching from class VIII to class XII.

Model School Littipara is an English-medium coeducational institution established in 2012. It has facilities for teaching from class VI to class XII.

Kasturba Gandhi Balika Vidyalaya Littipara is a Hindi-medium girls only institution established in 2008. It has facilities for teaching from class VI to class XII.

Project Girls High School is a Hindi-medium girls only institution established in 1983. It has facilities for teaching from class VIII to class X.
