= Pakuria =

- Village
- Location in Jharkhand, India Pakuria (India)
- Coordinates: 24.337538°N 87.647439°E
- Country: India
- State: Jharkhand
- District: Pakur

Population (2011)
  - Total: 3,234

Languages (*For language details see Pakuria block#Language and religion)
  - Official: Hindi, Urdu
- Time zone: UTC+5:30 (IST)
- PIN: 816117
- Telephone/ STD code: 06423
- Vehicle registration: JH 16
- Lok Sabha constituency: Rajmahal
- Vidhan Sabha constituency: Maheshpur
- Website: pakur.nic.in

Pakuria is a village in the Pakuria CD block in the Pakur subdivision of the Pakur district in the Indian state of Jharkhand.

== Geography ==
Cities, towns and locations in the Sahibganj, Godda and Pakur districts in Santhal Pargana Division
M: municipality, CT: census town, R: rural/ urban centre, H: historical/ religious/ tourist centre
Owing to space constraints in the small map, the actual locations in a larger map may vary slightly

=== Location ===
Pakuria is located at 24.337538°N 87.647439°E.

Pakuria has an area of 274 hectares (680 acres).

=== Overview ===
The map shows a hilly area with the Rajmahal hills running from the bank of the Ganges in the extreme north to the south, beyond the area covered by the map into Dumka district. ‘Farakka’ is marked on the map and that is where Farakka Barrage is, just inside West Bengal. Rajmahal coalfield is shown in the map. The entire area is overwhelmingly rural with only small pockets of urbanisation.

== Demographics ==
According to the 2011 Census of India, Pakuria had a total population of 3,234, of which 1,678 (52%) were males and 1,556 (48%) were females. Population in the age range 0–6 years was 394. The total number of literate persons in Pakuria was 2,390 (84.15% of the population over 6 years).

== Civic administration ==
=== Police station ===
Pakuria police station serves Pakuria CD block.

=== CD block HQ ===
Headquarters of Pakuria CD block is at Pakuria village.

== Education ==
Pakuriya High School is a Hindi-medium coeducational institution established in 1957. It has facilities for teaching from class IX to class XII.

Pakuriya Girls High School is a Hindi-medium girls only institution established in 1932. It has facilities for teaching from class V to class X.

Project Girls High School Pakuriya is a Hindi-medium girls only institution established in 1984. It has facilities for teaching from class VIII to class X.
