= Alamgir Alam =

Indian politician (born 1950)

Cabinet Minister, Government of Jharkhand
- In office 29 December 2019 – 17 May 2024
- Governor: Draupadi Murmu; Ramesh Bais; C. P. Radhakrishnan
- Chief Minister: Hemant Soren
- Ministry and Departments: Parliamentary Affairs.; Rural development.
- Preceded by: Nilkant Singh Munda

Member of the Jharkhand Legislative Assembly
- In office 2014–2024
- Preceded by: Aquil Akhtar
- Succeeded by: Nisat Alam
- Constituency: Pakur
- In office 2000–2009
- Preceded by: Beni Prasad Gupta
- Succeeded by: Aquil Akhtar
- Constituency: Pakur

Leader of Congress Legislative Party(CLP) in Jharkhand Assembly
- In office 2014–2024
- Succeeded by: Rameshwar Oraon

Personal details
- Born: Pakur, Jharkhand
- Party: Indian National Congress

Alamgir Alam (born 1950) is an Indian politician from Jharkhand. He is a four-term MLA for Pakur Assembly constituency representing the Indian National Congress in the Jharkhand Vidhan Sabha. He was elected to the Jharkhand Legislative Assembly in the 2000, 2005, 2014 and 2019 elections. He also served as the Speaker of the Jharkhand assembly between 20 October 2006, and 12 December 2009.

== Early life and education ==
Alam is from Pakur, Pakur District, Jharkhand. He is the son of Sanaul Haque. He completed his B.Sc. in 1974 at Sahibganj College, which is affiliated with Bhagalpur University.

== Career ==
Alam retained his seat in the 2019 Jharkhand Legislative Assembly election, defeating Akil Akhtar in 2009 elections. After the elections, in which Congress emerged victorious in coalition with JMM and RJD, Alam was elected as the leader of the Congress Legislature Party. On 29 December 2019, Alam was among the initial four members sworn into the state Cabinet along with chief minister Hemant Soren, Rameshwar Oraon and Satyanand Bhokta.

Earlier, he first became an MLA winning the 2000 Bihar Legislative Assembly election and retained the Pakur seat for the first time in the newly formed Jharkhand state in the 2005 Jharkhand Legislative Assembly election defeating Beni Prasad Gupta of the BJP, by a margin of 25,736 votes. Later, he won again in the 2014 and became a four time MLA winning in 2019. In between, he lost the 2009 Jharkhand Legislative Assembly election.

He was arrested by the ED on alleged charges in a money laundering case. He was released on bail by an order of the Supreme Court passed on 11 May 2026.
