= R. K. Sinha =

Indian academic

Radha Krishna Sinha (1 January 1917 – 27 August 2003) was an Indian scholar of English literature. He came from a family of elite intellectuals and academics. He was a DPhil from the University of Oxford and the head of the Department of English, Patna University. All his children and grandchildren teach English Literature.

== Biography ==
Sinha was born in an affluent family on 1 January 1917 at Maheshpur in the district of Munger in Bihar. He was a gold medallist at his university for his Master of Arts (English) degree and obtained a DPhil from the University of Oxford in 1950, he had been teaching at the University of Patna from 7 July 1938 to 31 January 1979, the topic of his research was Literary Influences on D H Lawrence. His guide was Lord David Cecil, an authority on Victorian novels. Sinha did research from October 1946 to December 1949 under his supervision.

== Obituaries ==
- A P J Abdul Kalam, Rashtrapati Bhawan, New Delhi R K Sinha was an eminent and outstanding English Professor of Patna University.
- Lt General S K Sinha, Governor of Jammu and Kashmir, I had the privilege of being taught by R K Sinha, he commanded respect, by his sincerity, depth of knowledge and teaching ability, he became a colossus, in English literature.
- Dinesh Nandan Sahay, Governor of Tripura, Dr Sinha, whose student I had been a legend in his lifetime, a versatile Professor of English of the Patna University, was a living encyclopaedia of English literature and an ocean of knowledge.
- Kailashpati Mishra, Governor of Gujarat, The noteworthy academic contribution of the late Dr R K Sinha, would long be remembered.
- Alison Richard, The Vice Chancellor, University of Cambridge, Dr Sinha served his country, his University, and scholarship with great distinction and imbued generations of students with love of the English language and its literature.
- Randolph Quirk, Former Vice-Chancellor University of London, It, commemorative volume is a thoroughly worthy objective, for the eminent Professor R K Sinha.
