= Bajrang Kumar Choudhary =

Bajrang Choudhary
- Born: 22 June 1968 (age 57); Hiranpur, Jharkhand, India
- Occupations: Managing Director, Bharat Road Network Limited
- Spouse: Rashmi Choudhary
- Website: www.brnl.in

Bajrang Kumar Choudhary serves as the Managing Director of Bharat Road Network Limited. He has been the Chief Executive Officer of Infrastructure Project Development for Srei Infrastructure Finance Limited and served as its Senior Vice President in Managing Director's Secretariat. He is also on the Board of several other companies such as Kolkata Mass Rapid Transit Private Limited, Bharat Road Network Limited, AMRL Hitech City Limited, Hyderabad Information Technology Venture Enterprises Limited, I Log Ports Private Limited among others.

In 2015, he was also featured as "Most Powerful, Successful People in the Indian Construction Industry" by Construction Sphere.

== Personal life ==
Bajrang Choudhary was born on 22 June 1968 in Hiranpur, Jharkhand and is the youngest son of Late Hari Prasad Choudhary and Gita Devi.

== Education ==
Bajrang is an alumnus of Delhi Public School, Mathura Road, New Delhi and a Bachelor of Commerce from Shri Ram College of Commerce, New Delhi.

== Career ==
He started his career with PricewaterhouseCoopers and was associated with them for four years. He traveled extensively to the USA and other parts of the world during his tenure with PwC. He then moved on to Apeejay Surrendra Group for over six years in multiple roles as Director, Chief Financial Officer, and Chief Executive Officer in their various group companies.

At Srei, he manages portfolio investment across the infrastructure sector – roads, ports, airports, water, and economic zones.

== Affiliations ==
Bajrang has been associated with various industry associations and company boards. He is currently the Chairman of ICC Infrastructure Expert Committee.
