= Pakuria block =

Pakuria Van Pakuria
- Community development block
- Location in Jharkhand, India
- Coordinates: 24°20′0″N 87°39′9″E
- Country: India
- State: Jharkhand
- District: Pakur

Government
  - Type: Federal democracy

Area
  - Total: 279.23 km^{2} (107.81 sq mi)
- Elevation: 146 m (479 ft)

Population (2011)
  - Total: 108,576
  - Density: 388.84/km^{2} (1,007.1/sq mi)

Literacy (2011)
  - Total literates: 47,945 (53.82%)
- Time zone: UTC+5:30 (IST)
- PIN: 816117 (Pakuria)
- Telephone/STD code: 06423
- Vehicle registration: JH-16
- Lok Sabha constituency: Rajmahal
- Vidhan Sabha constituency: Maheshpur
- Website: pakur.nic.in

Pakuria is a community development block that forms an administrative division in the Pakur subdivision of the Pakur district, Jharkhand state, India.

== Geography ==
Pakuria, the eponymous CD block headquarters, is located at 24°20′0″N 87°39′9″E.

It is located 52 km from Pakur, the district headquarters.

A predominantly hilly area, Pakur district has pockets of plain land. A long but narrow stretch between the Farakka Feeder Canal, located outside the district, and the Sahibganj loop line is very fertile. The Littipara and Amrapara CD blocks are largely covered by the Rajmahal hills. The rest of the district is rolling uplands. The district, once famous for its forests, have lost all of it, except a few hill tops in the Damin-i-koh area.

Pakuria CD block is bounded by Maheshpur block on the north, Nalhati I CD block in Birbhum district of West Bengal on the east, Shikaripara CD block in Dumka district on the south, and Kathikund and Gopikandar CD blocks in Dumka district on the west.

Pakuria CD block has an area of 279.23 km^{2}.Pakuria police station serves this block. Headquarters of this CD block is at Pakuria village.

== Demographics ==
=== Population ===
According to the 2011 Census of India, Pakuria CD block had a total population of 108,576, all of which were rural . There were 54,181 (50%) males and 54,395 (50%) females. Population in the age range 0–6 years was 19,484. Scheduled Castes numbered 3,268 (3.01%) and Scheduled Tribes numbered 69,680 (64.18%).

In the 2011 census Pakuria (village) had a population of 3,234.

=== Literacy ===
As of 2011 census, the total number of literate persons in the Pakuria CD block was 47,945 (53.82% of the population over 6 years) out of which 28,865 (60%) were males and 19,080 (40%) were females. The gender disparity (the difference between female and male literacy rates) was 20%.

See also – List of Jharkhand districts ranked by literacy rate

Literacy in CD Blocks of
Pakur district
Littipara – 40.70%
Amrapara – 46.55%
Hiranpur – 51.95%
Pakur – 51.95%
Maheshpur – 52.34%
Pakuria – 53.82%
Source: 2011 Census: CD Block Wise
Primary Census Abstract Data

=== Language and religion ===
According to the District Census Handbook, Pakur, 2011 census, as of 2011, Santali was the mother-tongue of 286,300 persons forming 31.80% of the population of Pakur district, followed by Bengali 252,070 persons (27.99%) and Hindi 101,440 persons (11.27%). Speakers of other scheduled languages were almost non-existent.

Hindi is the official language in Jharkhand and Urdu has been declared as an additional official language.

Religions in Pakuria Block (2011)
Religion	Percent
Hinduism	46.42%
Sarna	28.49%
Islam	16.47%
Christianity	8.36%
Others	0.25%

In 2001 census, Hindus constituted 47.15%, Muslims 15.16%, Christians 6.5% and others 30.84% of the population in Pakuria CD block. In the district as a whole, Hindus constituted 44.45%, Muslims 32.74% and Christians 6.01% of the population. The percentage of scheduled tribes in the population of Pakuria CD block was 64.35%. In the district as a whole, scheduled tribes constituted 44.59% of the population. Around 85% of the tribal population was composed of Santhals. There are two primitive groups – Mal Paharias and Sauria Paharias.

Languages of Pakuria block (2011)
1. Santali (62.5%)
2. Khortha (21.5%)
3. Bengali (9.90%)
4. Bhojpuri (2.54%)
5. Malto (1.55%)
6. Others (1.96%)

At the time of the 2011 census, 62.52% of the population spoke Santali, 21.53% Khortha, 9.90% Bengali, 2.54% Bhojpuri and 1.55% Malto as their first language.

== Rural poverty ==
50-60% of the population of Pakur district were in the BPL category in 2004–2005, being in the same category as Sahebganj, Deoghar and Garhwa districts. Rural poverty in Jharkhand declined from 66% in 1993–94 to 46% in 2004–05. In 2011, it has come down to 39.1%.

== Economy ==
=== Livelihood ===
Livelihood
in Pakuria CD block
1. Cultivators (30.0%)
2. Agricultural labourers (49.9%)
3. Household industries (2.75%)
4. Other Workers (17.3%)

In Pakuria CD block in 2011, amongst the class of total workers, cultivators numbered 15,378 and formed 30.04%, agricultural labourers numbered 25,563 and formed 49.93%, household industry workers numbered 1,410 and formed 2.75% and other workers numbered 8.844 and formed 17.28%. Total workers numbered 51,195 and formed 47.15% of the total population. Non-workers numbered 57,381 and formed 52.85% of total population.

Note: In the census records a person is considered a cultivator, if the person is engaged in cultivation/ supervision of land owned. When a person who works on another person's land for wages in cash or kind or share, is regarded as an agricultural labourer. Household industry is defined as an industry conducted by one or more members of the family within the household or village, and one that does not qualify for registration as a factory under the Factories Act. Other workers are persons engaged in some economic activity other than cultivators, agricultural labourers and household workers. It includes factory, mining, plantation, transport and office workers, those engaged in business and commerce, teachers and entertainment artistes.

=== Infrastructure ===
There are 148 inhabited villages in Pakuria CD block. In 2011, 21 villages had power supply. 5 villages had tap water (treated/ untreated), 132 villages had well water (covered/ uncovered), 147 villages had hand pumps, and 1 village did not have drinking water facility. 17 villages had post offices, 3 villages had sub post offices, 5 villages had telephones (land lines), 4 villages had public call offices and 31 villages had mobile phone coverage. 141 villages had pucca (paved) village roads, 2 villages had bus service (public/ private), 4 villages had autos/ modified autos, 6 villages had taxis/ vans, 13 villages had tractors, 7 villages had navigable waterways. 4 villages had bank branches, 2 villages had agricultural credit societies, 97 villages had cinema/ video halls, 7 villages had public libraries, public reading room. 40 villages had public distribution system, 17 villages had weekly haat (market) and ONLY 1 village had assembly polling station.

=== Agriculture ===
Pakur is predominantly a hilly district. There is a narrow fertile alluvial tract bordering the Ganges Feeder Canal. While the hills stretch from the north to the south-east, the rest is rolling area, which is less conducive to agricultural operations than the alluvial tract. The net sown area of the district is around 28%. Thus though the district is predominantly agricultural it offers only limited opportunities to the people. Many people from the district migrate to the neighbouring districts of West Bengal during the agricultural seasons. In Pakuria CD block 31.24% of the total area is cultivable area and 1.31% of the cultivable area is irrigated area.

=== Stone chips industry ===
Pakur is a centre of mining of black stone which is in great demand in the construction industry. There are four main circles for mining of stone – Pakur, Hiranpur, Mahespur and Pakuria. Stone chips are mined in Pakuria circle at villages such as Chandana, Golpur, Jharia, Khaksa, Khagachua and Matiachuan.

=== Backward Regions Grant Fund ===
Pakur district is listed as a backward region and receives financial support from the Backward Regions Grant Fund. The fund created by the Government of India is designed to redress regional imbalances in development. As of 2012, 272 districts across the country were listed under this scheme. The list includes 21 districts of Jharkhand.

== Education ==
Pakuria CD block had 17 villages with pre-primary schools, 119 villages with primary schools, 35 villages with middle schools, 4 villages with secondary schools, 1 village with senior secondary school, 28 villages with no educational facility.
.*Senior secondary schools are also known as Inter colleges in Jharkhand

== Healthcare ==
Pakuria CD block had 2 villages with primary health centres, 8 villages with primary health subcentres, 2 village with maternity and child welfare centre, 1 village with TB clinic, 1 village with allopathic hospital, 3 villages with dispensaries, 5 villages with family welfare centres, 5 villages with medicine shops.
.*Private medical practitioners, alternative medicine etc. not included
