= Hiranpur =

- Village
- Location in Jharkhand, India Hiranpur (India)
- Coordinates: 24.707111°N 87.704864°E
- Country: India
- State: Jharkhand
- District: Pakur

Population (2011)
  - Total: 1,135

Languages (*For language details see Hiranpur block#Language and religion)
  - Official: Hindi, Urdu
- Time zone: UTC+5:30 (IST)
- PIN: 816104
- Telephone/ STD code: 06435
- Vehicle registration: JH 16
- Lok Sabha constituency: Rajmahal
- Vidhan Sabha constituency: Litipara
- Website: pakur.nic.in

Hiranpur is a village in the Hiranpur CD block in the Pakur subdivision of the Pakur district in the Indian state of Jharkhand.

== Geography ==
Cities, towns and locations in the Sahibganj, Godda and Pakur districts in Santhal Pargana Division
M: municipality, CT: census town, R: rural/ urban centre, H: historical/ religious/ tourist centre
Owing to space constraints in the small map, the actual locations in a larger map may vary slightly

=== Location ===
Hiranpur is located at 24.707111°N 87.704864°E.

Hiranpur (Khas) has an area of 133 hectares (330 acres).

=== Overview ===
The map shows a hilly area with the Rajmahal hills running from the bank of the Ganges in the extreme north to the south, beyond the area covered by the map into Dumka district. ‘Farakka’ is marked on the map and that is where Farakka Barrage is, just inside West Bengal. Rajmahal coalfield is shown in the map. The area is overwhelmingly rural with only small pockets of urbanisation.

Note: The full screen map provides links to places marked on it, allowing users to navigate to the corresponding pages. Enlarging the map reveals additional features, including railway and road links.

== Demographics ==
According to the 2011 Census of India, Hiranpur (Khas) had a total population of 1,135, of which 564 (50%) were males and 571 (50%) were females. Population in the age range 0–6 years was 226. The total number of literate persons in Hiranpur was 582 (64.03% of the population over 6 years).

== Civic administration ==
=== Police station ===
Hiranpur police station serves Hiranpur CD block.

=== CD block HQ ===
Headquarters of Hiranpur CD block is at Hiranpur village.

== Education ==
Rajkiyakrit High School Hiranpur is a Hindi-medium coeducational institution established in 1950. It has facilities for teaching from class IX to class XII.
