= Lord David Cecil =

British biographer, historian, and scholar (1902 – 1986)

Lord David Gascoyne-Cecil CH
- Cecil in 1954
- Born: Edward Christian David Gascoyne-Cecil; 9 April 1902; Hatfield House, Hertfordshire, England
- Died: 1 January 1986 (aged 83); Cranborne, Dorset, England
- Education: Eton College; Christ Church, Oxford
- Occupations: Biographer; Historian; Academic
- Employers: Wadham College, Oxford; New College, Oxford
- Spouse: Rachel MacCarthy (m. 1932)
- Children: 3, including Jonathan
- Parents: James Gascoyne-Cecil, 4th Marquess of Salisbury; Lady Cicely Gore

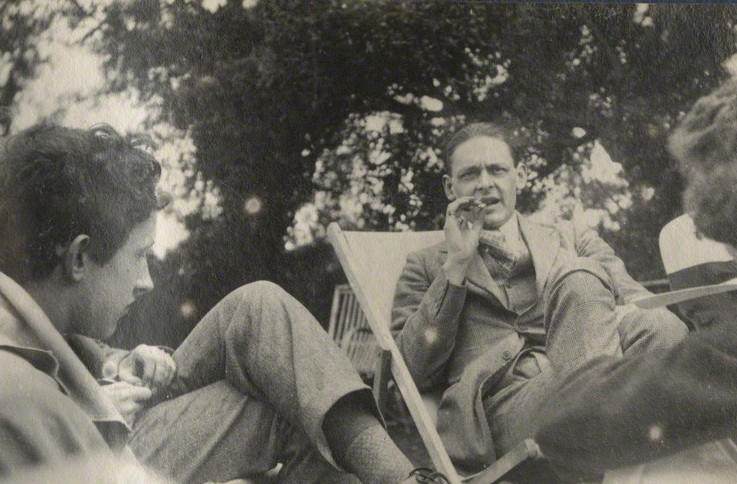
Lord David Cecil (left) with T. S. Eliot, photo by Lady Ottoline Morrell

Lord Edward Christian David Gascoyne-Cecil, CH (9 April 1902 – 1 January 1986) was a British biographer, historian, and scholar. He held the style of "Lord" by courtesy as a younger son of a marquess.

== Early life and studies ==
David Cecil was the youngest of the four children of James Gascoyne-Cecil, 4th Marquess of Salisbury, and the former Lady Cicely Gore (second daughter of Arthur Gore, 5th Earl of Arran). His siblings were Lady Beatrice Edith Mildred Cecil (afterwards Baroness Harlech), Robert Gascoyne-Cecil, 5th Marquess of Salisbury (1893–1972) and Lady Mary Alice Cecil (afterwards Mary Cavendish, Duchess of Devonshire). Cecil was a delicate child, suffering from a tubercular gland in his neck at the age of 8 years, and after an operation he spent a great deal of time in bed, where he developed his love of reading.

Because of his delicate health his parents sent him to Eton College later than other boys, and he survived the experience by spending one day a week in bed. After school he went on to Christ Church, Oxford, as an undergraduate.

== Career ==
Cecil read Modern History at Oxford and in 1924 obtained first-class honours. From 1924 to 1930 he was a Fellow of Wadham College, Oxford. With his first publication, The Stricken Deer (1929), a sympathetic study of the poet Cowper, he made an immediate impact as a literary historian. Studies followed on Walter Scott, early Victorian novelists and Jane Austen.

In 1939 he became a Fellow of New College, Oxford, where he remained a Fellow until 1969, when he became an Honorary Fellow.

In 1947 he became Professor of Rhetoric at Gresham College, London, for a year; but in 1948 he returned to the University of Oxford and remained a Professor of English Literature there until 1970. For a time Cecil was an associate of the literary group known as the "Inklings", which included notable authors such as J.R.R. Tolkien, C.S. Lewis, and Owen Barfield. While a professor at New College Cecil's pupils included Kingsley Amis, Bidhu Bhusan Das, R. K. Sinha, John Bayley, the Milton scholar Dennis Burden, and Ludovic Kennedy. Neil Powell describes Amis's relationship with him, or lack of a relationship, as follows:

[Amis's] allocated supervisor was Lord David Cecil, who seemed disinclined to supervise anything at all; after a term and a half had passed without any contact between them, Kingsley decided to go in search of him at New College. This caused much amusement at the porters' lodge, as if he had asked for the Shah of Persia: "Oh no, sir. Lord David? Oh, you'd have to get up very early in the morning to get hold of him. Oh dear, oh dear. Lord David in college, well I never did."

A 1949 lecture by Cecil is credited with inspiring L. P. Hartley's famous line "The past is a foreign country: they do things differently there." (The Go-Between, 1953). Cecil's words were:

Past periods are like foreign countries: regions inhabited by men of like passions to our own, but with different customs and codes of behaviour.

During his academic career Cecil published studies of Hardy, Shakespeare, Thomas Gray, Dorothy Osborne and Walter Pater. As well as his literary studies he also published a two-volume historical biography of Lord Melbourne (to whom he was distantly related) and appreciations of visual artists – Augustus John, Max Beerbohm, Samuel Palmer and Edward Burne-Jones. In retirement he published further literary and biographic studies of Walter de la Mare, Jane Austen, Charles Lamb and Desmond MacCarthy, as well as a history of his own family, The Cecils of Hatfield House and an account of Some Dorset Country Houses. His anthology of writers who had given him special pleasure, Library Looking Glass, appeared in 1975.

== Family and personal life ==
In 1932 Cecil married Rachel MacCarthy, daughter of the literary journalist Sir Desmond MacCarthy. They had three children, including actor Jonathan Cecil.

== Publications ==
The Young Melbourne Pan Books edition, 1948

- The Stricken Deer or The Life of Cowper (1929) [on the poet William Cowper; this won the 1929 James Tait Black Memorial Prize]
- Sir Walter Scott: The Raven Miscellany (1933)
- Early Victorian Novelists : essays in revaluation (1934)
- Jane Austen (1936)
- The Young Melbourne and the Story of his Marriage with Caroline Lamb (1939; reprinted 1948 and 1954)
- The English Poets (1941)
- The Oxford Book of Christian Verse (1941) [editor]
- Men of the R.A.F. (1942) [with Sir William Rothenstein]
- Hardy the Novelist: an Essay in Criticism (1942) [Clark Lectures]
- Antony and Cleopatra, the fourth W. P. Ker memorial lecture delivered in the University of Glasgow, 4 May 1943 (1944)
- Poetry of Thomas Gray (1945) [Warton Lecture]
- Two Quiet Lives (1948) [on Dorothy Osborne and Thomas Gray]
- Poets & Story-tellers (1949) [essays]
- Reading as One of the Fine Arts (1949) inaugural lecture delivered before the University of Oxford on 28 May 1949
- Lord M, or the Later Life of Lord Melbourne (1954)
- Walter Pater--the Scholar Artist (1955) Rede Lecture
- Augustus John: Fifty-two Drawings (1957)
- The Fine Art of Reading and Other Literary Studies (1957)
- Modern Verse in English 1900-1950 (1958) [editor with Allen Tate]
- Max (1964) [biography of Max Beerbohm]
- Visionary and Dreamer : Two poetic painters, Samuel Palmer & Edward Burne-Jones (from the A.W. Mellon Lectures, 1969)
- The Bodley Head Beerbohm (1970) [editor]
- Max Beerbohm: Selected Prose (1970) [editor]
- A Choice of Tennyson's Verse (1971) [editor]
- The Cecils of Hatfield House: a Portrait of an English Ruling Family (1973)
- Walter de la Mare (1973) [English Association leaflet]
- A Victorian Album: Julia Margaret Cameron and her Circle (1975) [with Graham Ovenden]
- Library Looking-Glass: A Personal Anthology (1975) [anthology]
- Lady Ottoline's Album (1976)
- A Portrait of Jane Austen (1978)
- A Portrait of Charles Lamb (1983)
- Desmond MacCarthy, the Man and His Writings (1984) [editor]
- Some Dorset Country Houses (1985)
- A Choice of Bridges's Verse (1987) [editor]

== See also ==
The Uffizi Society, Oxford, c. 1920. Ralph Dutton (wearing glasses) is seated third from left. Also in the front row are Lord Balniel, later 28th Earl of Crawford (2nd from left); Anthony Eden, subsequently Prime Minister and Earl of Avon (4th from left); and Lord David Cecil (5th from left). Second row: later Sir Henry Studholme (5th from left).

- List of Gresham Professors of Rhetoric

== Sources ==
- Glyer, Diana (2007) The Company They Keep: C. S. Lewis and J. R. R. Tolkien as Writers in Community, Ohio: Kent State University Press. ISBN 978-0-87338-890-0
