= Ramnathpur, Pakur =

Ramnathpur is a village in Pakur district of Jharkhand state of India.
