= Maheshpur, Pakur =

Village in Jharkhand, India

Maheshpur
- Village
- Location in Jharkhand, India Maheshpur (India)
- Coordinates: 24.475833°N 87.761667°E
- Country: India 24.475833,87.761667
- State: Jharkhand
- District: Pakur

Population (2011)
  - Total: 5,797

Languages (*For language details see Maheshpur block#Language and religion)
  - Official: Hindi, Urdu
- Time zone: UTC+5:30 (IST)
- PIN: 816106
- Telephone/ STD code: 06423
- Vehicle registration: JH 16
- Lok Sabha constituency: Rajmahal
- Vidhan Sabha constituency: Maheshpur
- Website: pakur.nic.in

Maheshpur is a village in the Maheshpur CD block in the Pakur subdivision of the Pakur district in the Indian state of Jharkhand.

== Geography ==
Cities, towns and locations in the Sahibganj, Godda and Pakur districts in Santhal Pargana Division
M: municipality, CT: census town, R: rural/ urban centre, H: historical/ religious/ tourist centre
Owing to space constraints in the small map, the actual locations in a larger map may vary slightly

=== Location ===
Maheshpur is located at 24.476833°N 87.761667°E.

Maheshpur has an area of 201 hectares (500 acres).

=== Overview ===
The map shows a hilly area with the Rajmahal hills running from the bank of the Ganges in the extreme north to the south, beyond the area covered by the map into Dumka district. ‘Farakka’ is marked on the map and that is where Farakka Barrage is, just inside West Bengal. Rajmahal coalfield is shown in the map. The entire area is overwhelmingly rural with only small pockets of urbanisation.

Note: The full screen map is interesting. All places marked on the map are linked and you can easily move on to another page of your choice. Enlarge the map to see what else is there – one gets railway links, many more road links and so on.

== Demographics ==
According to the 2011 Census of India, Maheshpur had a total population of 5,797, of which 3,019 (52%) were males and 2,778 (48%) were females. Population in the age range 0–6 years was 832. The total number of literate persons in Maheshpur was 3,790 (76.33% of the population over 6 years).

== Civic administration ==
=== Police station ===
Maheshpur police station serves Maheshpur CD block.

=== CD block HQ ===
Headquarters of Maheshpur CD block is at Maheshpur village.

== Education ==
Maheshpur Raj High School is a Hindi-medium coeducational institution established in 1956. It has facilities for teaching from class IX to class XII.

Jawahar Navodaya Vidyalaya, at Silampur located nearby, is a Hindi-medium coeducational institution established in 2009. It has facilities for teaching from class VII to class X. The school has a library with 1,248 books. It has 15 computers and a computer aided learning lab.

== See also ==
- Maheshpur Raj
