= Pakur block =

Pakur Pakaur
- Community development block
- Location in Jharkhand, India
- Coordinates: 24°38′18″N 87°50′38″E
- Country: India
- State: Jharkhand
- District: Pakur

Government
  - Type: Federal democracy

Area
  - Total: 222.04 km^{2} (85.73 sq mi)
- Elevation: 30 m (98 ft)

Population (2011)
  - Total: 282,075
  - Density: 1,270.4/km^{2} (3,290.3/sq mi)

Languages
  - Official: Hindi, Urdu

Literacy (2011)
  - Total literates: 91,080 (41.55%)
- Time zone: UTC+5:30 (IST)
- PIN: 816107 (Pakur)
- Telephone/STD code: 06435
- Vehicle registration: JH-16
- Lok Sabha constituency: Rajmahal
- Vidhan Sabha constituency: Pakaur
- Website: pakur.nic.in

Pakur (also spelled Pakaur) is a community development block that forms an administrative division in the Pakur subdivision of the Pakur district, Jharkhand state, India.

== Geography ==
Pakur, the eponymous CD block headquarters, is located at 24°38′18″N 87°50′38″E.

A predominantly hilly area, Pakur district has pockets of plain land. A long but narrow stretch between the Farakka Feeder Canal, located outside the district, and the Sahibganj loop line is very fertile. The Littipara and Amrapara CD blocks are largely covered by the Rajmahal hills. The rest of the district is rolling uplands. The district, once famous for its forests, has lost all of them, except a few hilltops in the Damin-i-koh area.

Pakur CD block is bounded by Barharwa CD block in Sahibganj district and Farakka CD block in Murshidabad district of West Bengal on the north, Samsherganj, Suti II and Suti I CD blocks in Murshidabad district of West Bengal on the east, Murarai I CD block in Birbhum district of West Bengal and Maheshpur CD block on the south, and Hiranpur CD block on the west.

Pakur CD block has an area of 222.04 km^{2}. Pakur Town, Pakur Muffasil and Pakur Mahila police stations serve this block. Headquarters of this CD block is at Pakur town.

== Demographics ==
=== Population ===
According to the 2011 Census of India, Pakur CD block had a total population of 282,075, of which 260,403 were rural and 21,672 were urban. There were 141,564 (50%) males and 140,511 (50%) females. Population in the age range 0–6 years was 62,846. Scheduled Castes numbered 7,733 (2.74%) and Scheduled Tribes numbered 41,180 (14.60%).

Pakur CD Block is only one in the district which has recorded some degree of urbanization. Pakur town is the only one in the district to have a nagar palika. There are three census towns in Pakaur CD Block (2011 population in brackets): Kumarpur (7,153), Sagarmpur (6,184) and Raghunandanpur (8,335).

=== Literacy ===
As of 2011 census, the total number of literates in Pakaur CD Block was 91,080 (41.55% of the population over 6 years) out of which 51,274 (56%) were males and 39,806 (44%) were females. The gender disparity (the difference between female and male literacy rates) was 12%.

See also – List of Jharkhand districts ranked by literacy rate

Literacy in CD Blocks of
Pakur district
Littipara – 40.70%
Amrapara – 46.55%
Hiranpur – 51.95%
Pakur – 51.95%
Maheshpur – 52.34%
Pakuria – 53.82%
Source: 2011 Census: CD Block Wise
Primary Census Abstract Data

=== Language and religion ===
Hindi is the official language in Jharkhand and Urdu has been declared as an additional official language.

Religions in Pakur block (2011)
Religion	Percent
Islam	64.38%
Hinduism	29.59%
Christianity	2.98%
Sarna	2.74%
Other or not stated	0.32%

As of 2001 census, Muslims constituted 60.58% of the population in Pakur CD block, the highest amongst all blocks of the district. Hindus constituted 29.50% of the population. In the district as a whole, Hindus constituted 44.45%, Muslims 32.74% and Christians 6.01% of the population. In 2011, these percentages shifted so Muslims were 64.38% of the population and Hindus 29.59%. The percentage of scheduled tribes in the population of Pakur CD block was 15.48%, the lowest amongst all blocks of the district. In the district as a whole, scheduled tribes constituted 44.59% of the population. Around 85% of the tribal population was composed of Santhals. There are two primitive groups in the district – Mal Paharias and Sauria Paharias. Pakur CD Block covers an area of 221.71 km^{2} and has 36 panchayats, 155 inhabited (chiragi) villages and 34 uninhabited (bechiragi) villages.

Languages of Pakur block (2011)
1. Bengali (75.0%)
2. Santali (12.1%)
3. Hindi (5.03%)
4. Khortha (3.58%)
5. Bhojpuri (1.50%)
6. Urdu (1.16%)
7. Others (1.62%)

At the time of the 2011 census, 75.05% of the population spoke Bengali, 12.06% Santali, 5.03% Hindi, 3.58% Khortha, 1.50% Bhojpuri and 1.16% Urdu as their first language.

== Rural poverty ==
50-60% of the population of Pakur district were in the BPL category in 2004–2005, being in the same category as Sahebganj, Deoghar and Garhwa districts. Rural poverty in Jharkhand declined from 66% in 1993–94 to 46% in 2004–05. In 2011, it has come down to 39.1%.

== Economy ==
=== Livelihood ===
Livelihood
in Pakur CD block
1. Cultivators (9.13%)
2. Agricultural labourers (19.8%)
3. Household industries (8.67%)
4. Other Workers (62.4%)

In Pakur CD block in 2011, amongst the class of total workers, cultivators numbered 10,360 and formed 9.13%, agricultural labourers numbered 22,460 and formed 19.79%, household industry workers numbered 9,835 and formed 8.67% and other workers numbered 70,817 and formed 62.41%. Total workers numbered 137,318 and formed 41.88% of the total population. Non-workers numbered 190,597 and formed 58.12% of total population.

Note: In the census records a person is considered a cultivator, if the person is engaged in cultivation/ supervision of land owned. When a person who works on another person's land for wages in cash or kind or share, is regarded as an agricultural labourer. Household industry is defined as an industry conducted by one or more members of the family within the household or village, and one that does not qualify for registration as a factory under the Factories Act. Other workers are persons engaged in some economic activity other than cultivators, agricultural labourers and household workers. It includes factory, mining, plantation, transport and office workers, those engaged in business and commerce, teachers and entertainment artistes.

=== Infrastructure ===
There are 156 inhabited villages in Pakur CD block. In 2011, 69 villages had power supply. 9 villages had tap water (treated/ untreated), 138 villages had well water (covered/ uncovered), 112 villages had hand pumps, and all villages had drinking water facility. 10 villages had post offices, 11 villages had sub post offices, 20 villages had telephones (land lines), 21 villages had public call offices and 78 villages had mobile phone coverage. 136 villages had pucca (paved) village roads, 6 villages had bus service (public/ private), 10 villages had autos/ modified autos, 39 villages had taxis/ vans, 81 villages had tractors, 5 villages had navigable waterways. 6 villages had bank branches, 3 villages had agricultural credit societies, 37 villages had cinema/ video halls, 15 villages had public libraries, public reading room. 73 villages had public distribution system, 19 villages had weekly haat (market) and 9 villages had assembly polling stations.

=== Agriculture ===
Pakur is predominantly a hilly district. There is a narrow fertile alluvial tract bordering the Ganges Feeder Canal. While the hills stretch from the north to the south-east, the rest is rolling area, which is less conducive to agricultural operations than the alluvial strip. The net sown area of the district is around 28%. Thus though the district is predominantly agricultural it offers only limited opportunities to the people. Many people from the district migrate to the neighbouring districts of West Bengal during the agricultural seasons. In Pakur CD block 34.25% of the total area is cultivable area and 8.73% of the cultivable area is irrigated area.

=== Stone chips industry ===
Pakur is a centre of mining of black stone which is in great demand in the construction industry. There are four circles for mining of stone – Pakur, Hiranpur, Mahespur and Pakuria. Stone chips are mined in Pakur circle at villages such as Barhabad, Barmesia, Matiyara, Basmata, Bishanpur, Durgapur, Gokulpur, Harirampur, Jogigaria, Kalidaspur, Kashila, Kanhupur, Khaprajora, Kulapahari, Kusmadanga, Kumarpur, Lakhipahari, Malpahari, Mangalpara, Mateyapahari, Patrapahari, Piplajori, Rajbandh, Ramchandrapur, Ramnagar, Saharkol, Salboni, Sitagarh, Sonajori, Sree Rampur, Sundarpahari and Takatola.

Pakur stone industry has about 585 mines/quarries and around 800 crushers are in operation.

=== Backward Regions Grant Fund ===
Pakur district is listed as a backward region and receives financial support from the Backward Regions Grant Fund. The fund created by the Government of India is designed to redress regional imbalances in development. As of 2012, 272 districts across the country were listed under this scheme. The list includes 21 districts of Jharkhand.

== Transport ==
Pakur is on the Sahibganj Loop. It is part of Howrah Division of Eastern Railway, which handles predominantly passenger traffic. Originating freight in the division is mainly stone chips and ballast from Pakur railway station and Rajgram railway station, and coal traffic from Pakur.

== Education ==
Pakur CD block had 23 villages with pre-primary schools, 103 villages with primary schools, 46 villages with middle schools, 4 villages with secondary schools, 2 villages with senior secondary schools, 3 special schools for disabled, 51 villages with no educational facility.
.*Senior secondary schools are also known as Inter colleges in Jharkhand

== Healthcare ==
Pakur CD block had 2 villages with primary health centres, 11 villages with primary health subcentres, 1 village with dispensary, 1 village with family welfare centre, 17 villages with medicine shops.
.*Private medical practitioners, alternative medicine etc. not included
