= Maheshpur block =

Maheshpur
- Community development block
- Location in Jharkhand, India
- Coordinates: 24°28′33″N 87°45′42″E
- Country: India
- State: Jharkhand
- District: Pakur

Government
  - Type: Federal democracy

Area
  - Total: 450.99 km^{2} (174.13 sq mi)

Population (2011)
  - Total: 208,862
  - Density: 463.12/km^{2} (1,199.5/sq mi)

Languages
  - Official: Hindi, Urdu

Literacy (2011)
  - Total literates: 89,537 (52.34%)
- Time zone: UTC+5:30 (IST)
- PIN: 816106 (Mahespur Raj)
- Telephone/STD code: 06423
- Vehicle registration: JH-16
- Lok Sabha constituency: Rajmahal
- Vidhan Sabha constituency: Maheshpur
- Website: pakur.nic.in

Maheshpur is a community development block that forms an administrative division in the Pakur subdivision of the Pakur district, Jharkhand state, India.

== History ==
The area was earlier part of Maheshpur Raj.

== Geography ==
Maheshpur, the eponymous CD block headquarters, is located at 24°28′33″N 87°45′42″E.

It is located 28 km from Pakur, the district headquarters.

A predominantly hilly area, Pakur district has pockets of plain land. A long but narrow stretch between the Farakka Feeder Canal, located outside the district, and the Sahibganj loop line is very fertile. The Littipara and Amrapara CD blocks are largely covered by the Rajmahal hills. The rest of the district is rolling uplands. The district, once famous for its forests, have lost all of it, except a few hill tops in the Damin-i-koh area.

Maheshpur CD block is bounded by Hiranpur and Pakur CD blocks on the north, Murarai I and Nalhati I CD blocks in Birbhum district of West Bengal on the east, Pakuria CD block on the south, and Gopikandar CD block in Dumka district and Amrapara CD block on the west.

Maheshpur CD block has an area of 450.99 km^{2}.Maheshpur police station serves this block. Headquarters of this CD block is at Maheshpur town.

== Demographics ==
=== Population ===
According to the 2011 Census of India, Maheshpur CD block had a total population of 208,862, all of which were rural . There were 104,984 (50%) males and 103,878 (50%) females. Population in the age range 0–6 years was 37,798. Scheduled Castes numbered 6,074 (2.91%) and Scheduled Tribes numbered 102,467 (49.06%).

In 2011 census Maheshpur (village) had a population of 5,797.

=== Literacy ===
As of 2011 census, the total number of literate persons in Maheshpur CD block was 89,537 (52.34% of the population over 6 years) out of which 52,616 (59%) were males and 36,931 (41%) were females. The gender disparity (the difference between female and male literacy rates) was 18%.

See also – List of Jharkhand districts ranked by literacy rate

Literacy in CD Blocks of
Pakur district
Littipara – 40.70%
Amrapara – 46.55%
Hiranpur – 51.95%
Pakur – 51.95%
Maheshpur – 52.34%
Pakuria – 53.82%
Source: 2011 Census: CD Block Wise
Primary Census Abstract Data

=== Language and religion ===
According to the District Census Handbook, Pakur, 2011 census, as of 2011, Santali was the mother-tongue of 286,300 persons forming 31.80% of the population of Pakur district, followed by Bengali 252,070 persons (27.99%) and Hindi 101,440 persons (11.27%). Speakers of other scheduled languages were almost non-existent.

Hindi is the official language in Jharkhand and Urdu has been declared as an additional official language.

Religions in Maheshpur Block (2011)
Religion	Percent
Hinduism	54.51%
Islam	27.06%
Sarna	10.55%
Christianity	7.66%
Others	0.22%

In 2001 census, Hindus constituted 55.48%, Muslims 25.87% and Christians 5.19% of the population in Maheshpur CD block. In the district as a whole, Hindus constituted 44.45%, Muslims 32.74% and Christians 6.01% of the population. The percentage of scheduled tribes in the population of Maheshpur CD block was 49.80%. In the district as a whole, scheduled tribes constituted 44.59% of the population. Around 85% of the tribal population was composed of Santhals. There are two primitive groups – Mal Paharias and Sauria Paharias.

Languages of Maheshpur block (2011)
1. Santali (45.6%)
2. Bengali (36.7%)
3. Khortha (11.9%)
4. Malto (1.97%)
5. Bhojpuri (1.78%)
6. Koda (0.96%)
7. Others (1.13%)

At the time of the 2011 census, 45.60% of the population spoke Santali, 36.68% Bengali, 11.88% Khortha, 1.97% Malto, 1.78% Bhojpuri and 0.96% Koda as their first language.

== Rural poverty ==
50-60% of the population of Pakur district were in the BPL (below poverty line) category in 2004–2005, being in the same category as Sahebganj, Deoghar and Garhwa districts. Rural poverty in Jharkhand declined from 66% in 1993–94 to 46% in 2004–05. In 2011, it had come down to 39.1%.

== Economy ==
=== Livelihood ===
Livelihood
in Maheshpur CD block
1. Cultivators (33.6%)
2. Agricultural labourers (48.6%)
3. Household industries (1.71%)
4. Other Workers (16.1%)

In Maheshpur CD block in 2011, amongst the class of total workers, cultivators numbered 33,047 and formed 33.58%, agricultural labourers numbered 43,522 and formed 48.64%, household industry workers numbered 1,533 and formed 1.71% and other workers numbered 14,380 and formed 57.16%. Total workers numbered 89,482 and formed 42.84% of the total population. Non-workers numbered 119,380 and formed 57.16% of total population.

Note: In the census records a person is considered a cultivator, if the person is engaged in cultivation/ supervision of land owned. When a person who works on another person's land for wages in cash or kind or share, is regarded as an agricultural labourer. Household industry is defined as an industry conducted by one or more members of the family within the household or village, and one that does not qualify for registration as a factory under the Factories Act. Other workers are persons engaged in some economic activity other than cultivators, agricultural labourers and household workers. It includes factory, mining, plantation, transport and office workers, those engaged in business and commerce, teachers and entertainment artistes.

=== Infrastructure ===
There are 322 inhabited villages in Maheshpur CD block. In 2011, 31 villages had power supply. 15 villages had tap water (treated/ untreated), 302 villages had well water (covered/ uncovered), 303 villages had hand pumps, and all villages had drinking water facility. 25 villages had post offices, 7 villages had sub post offices, 8 villages had telephones (land lines), 25 villages had public call offices and 51 villages had mobile phone coverage. 300 villages had pucca (paved) village roads, 37 villages had bus service (public/ private), 4 villages had autos/ modified autos, 24 villages had taxis/ vans, 66 villages had tractors, 20 villages had navigable waterways. 9 villages had bank branches, 3 village had ATMs, 27 villages had agricultural credit societies, 266 villages had cinema/ video halls, 19 villages had public libraries, public reading room. 108 villages had public distribution system, 33 villages had weekly haat (market) and 4 villages had assembly polling stations.

=== Agriculture ===
Pakur is predominantly a hilly district. There is a narrow fertile alluvial tract bordering the Ganges Feeder Canal. While the hills stretch from the north to the south-east, the rest is rolling area, which is less conducive to agricultural operations than the alluvial strip. The net sown area of the district is around 28%. Thus though the district is predominantly agricultural it offers only limited opportunities to the people. Many people from the district migrate to the neighbouring districts of West Bengal during the agricultural seasons. In Maheshpur CD block 36.66% of the total area is cultivable area and 14.58% of the cultivable area is irrigated area.

=== Stone chips industry ===
Pakur is a centre of mining of black stone which is in great demand in the construction industry. There are four circles for mining of stone – Pakur, Hiranpur, Mahespur and Pakuria. Stone chips are mined in Maheshpur circle at villages such as Ambaipahari, Arjundaha, Bagmura, Balliapatra, Chandpur, Dhabdangal, Dumarghati, Dumkadanga, Huliapatra, Harishpur, Kashinathpur, Nimchua, Mohulpahari, Rolagram, Sopram (Chhota Dumarghtti), Sundarpahari, Sriramgaria and Indranpahari.

=== Backward Regions Grant Fund ===
Pakur district is listed as a backward region and receives financial support from the Backward Regions Grant Fund. The fund created by the Government of India is designed to redress regional imbalances in development. As of 2012, 272 districts across the country were listed under this scheme. The list includes 21 districts of Jharkhand.

== Education ==
Maheshpur CD block had 39 villages with pre-primary schools, 225 villages with primary schools, 67 villages with middle schools, 9 villages with secondary schools, 3 villages with senior secondary schools, 1 general degree college, 1 special school for disabled, 94 villages with no educational facility.
.*Senior secondary schools are also known as Inter colleges in Jharkhand

== Healthcare ==
Maheshpur CD block had 4 villages with primary health centres, 22 villages with primary health subcentres, 4 village with maternity and child welfare centre, 2 villages with TB clinics, 6 villages with allopathic hospitals, 3 villages with dispensaries, 1 village with veterinary hospital, 2 villages with family welfare centres, 3 villages with medicine shops.
.*Private medical practitioners, alternative medicine etc. not included
