= Kotalpokhar railway station =

Railway station in Jharkhand, India

Kotalpukur
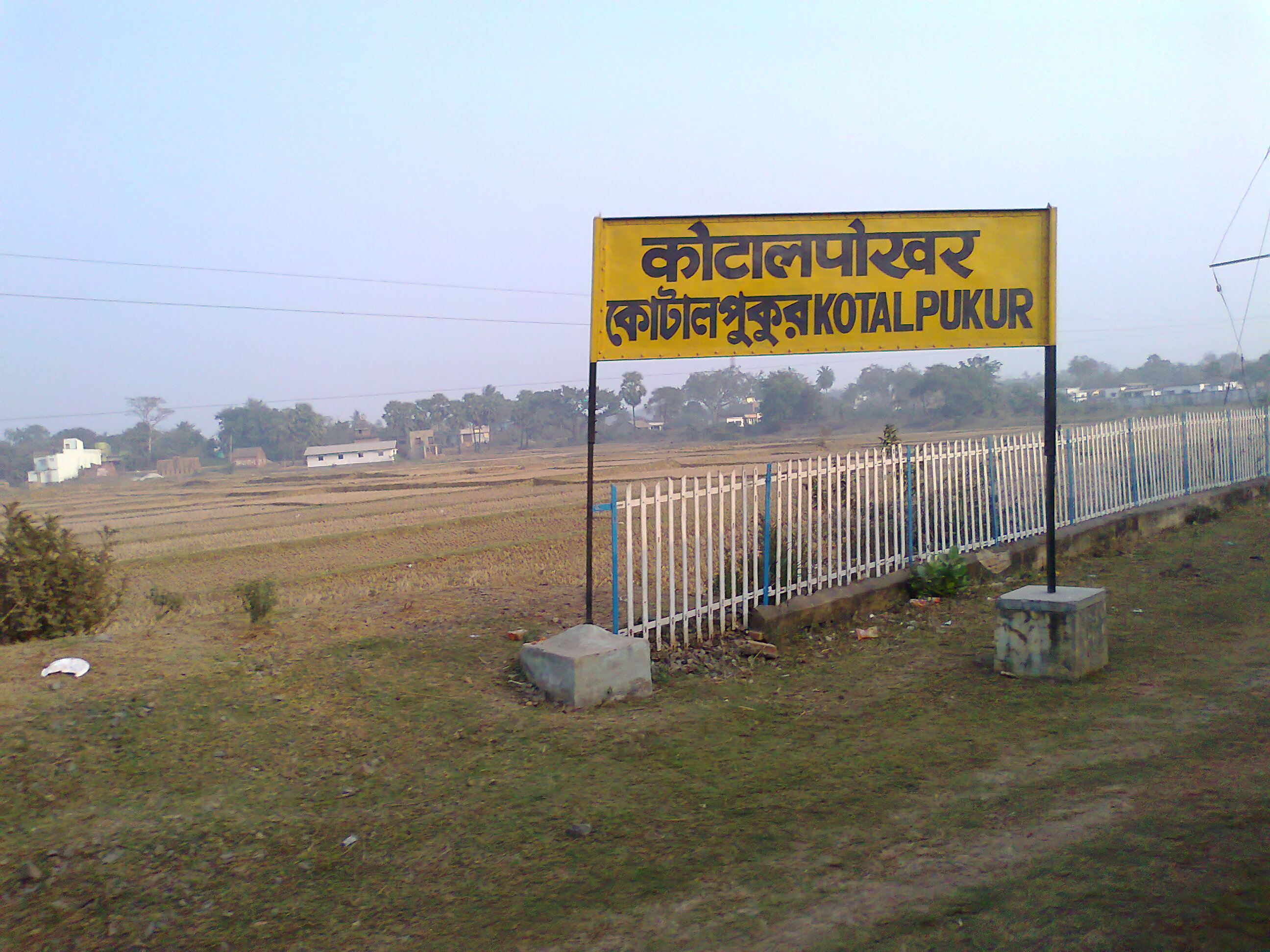

General information
- Location: Kotalpukur, Jharkhand; India
- Coordinates: 24°44′25″N 87°49′28″E
- Elevation: 40 m (130 ft)
- System: Indian Railways station
- Owner: Indian Railways
- Line: Rampurhat-Malda Town Section
- Platforms: 2
- Tracks: 2

Construction
- Structure type: Standard

Other information
- Station code: KLP
- Zone(s): Eastern Railways
- Division(s): Howrah

History
- Former names: East India Railway
Location

Kotalpokhar (code:KLP) is a railway station on the Rampurhat-Malda Town section, located in the town of Kotalpukur, Jharkhand. It is situated at Barharwa Tehsil village in Sahebganj district in the Indian state of Jharkhand.

Kotalpukur
Next station west: Gumani	Indian Railways : Sahibganj loop			Next station east: Tilbhita
Next station west: Gumani	Stop no. 46	km from start 0	Platforms 2	Next station east: Tilbhita
