= Maheshpur Raj =

Princely state in India

Maheshpur Raj was initially Princely state in India. It occupied a large area now a part of Maheshpur block, in Pakur district of Jharkhand, India. The rulers of Maheshpur Raj were Bhumihars.

According to the chronicles of the ruling family, Maheshpur Raj was the capital of the Sultanabad state. In the 14th century, the kingdom of Sultanabad was found by Raja Banku Singh who established his capital at Sinthbak and later the capital was transferred to Debinagar and finally to Maheshpur Raj. His younger brother Raja Anku Singh established the Handua state. The ruling family were scions of Bansi royal from Uttar Pradesh.
