= Maheshpur, Bihar =

Maheshpur
- Village
- Location within Bihar
- Coordinates: 27.108°N 84.464°E
- Country: India
- State: Bihar
- District: West Champaran district

Population
  - Total: 2.660

Languages
  - Official: Hindi
- Time zone: UTC+5:30 (IST)
- ISO 3166 code: IN-BR

Maheshpur is a village in West Champaran district in the Indian state of Bihar.

== Demographics ==
As of the 2011 census of India, Maheshpur had a population of 2,660 in 473 households. Males constitute 52.5% of the population and females 47.4%. Maheshpur has an average literacy rate of 44.81%, lower than the national average of 74%: male literacy is 61.74%, and female literacy is 38.25%. In Maheshpur, 11.72% of the population is under 6 years of age.
