= Tilbhita railway station =

Railway station in Jharkhand, India

Tilbhita
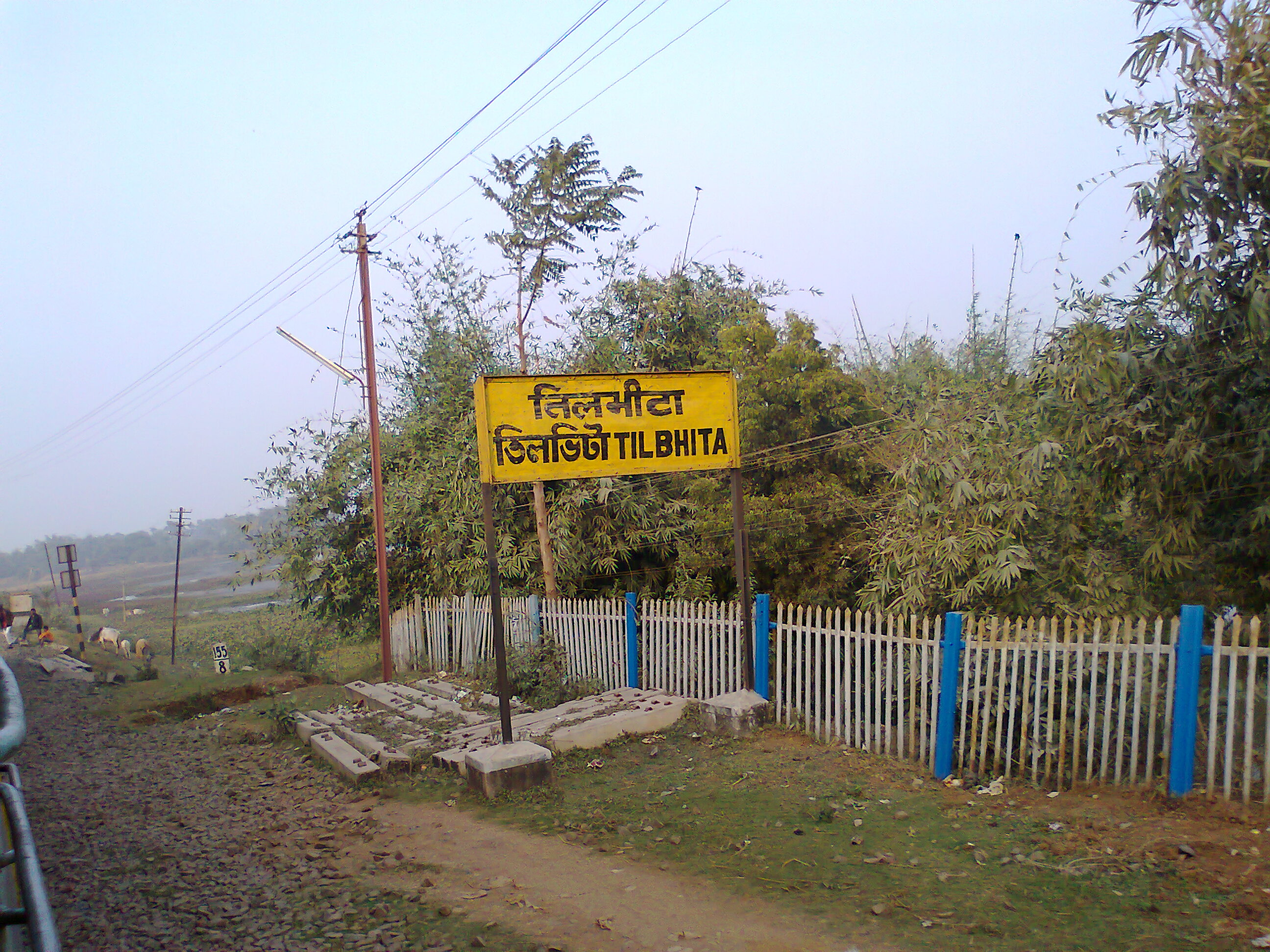

General information
- Location: Sagarmpur, Jharkhand; India
- Elevation: 34 m (112 ft)
- System: Indian Railways station
- Owner: Indian Railways
- Line: Rampurhat-Malda Town Section
- Platforms: 2
- Tracks: 3

Construction
- Structure type: Standard

Other information
- Station code: TBB
- Zone(s): Eastern Railways
- Division(s): Howrah

History
- Former names: East India Railway
Location

Tilbhita railway station (code:TBB) is a small halt on the Rampurhat-Malda Town section, that serves as a stone crushing unit, and a loading place. A few local trains have a stoppage here.

Tilbhita
Next station west: Kotalpokhar	Indian Railways : Sahibganj loop			Next station east: Pakur
Next station west: Kotalpokhar	Stop no. 47	km from start 0	Platforms 2	Next station east: Pakur
