= Pakur Assembly constituency =

Pakur
- Constituency No. 5 for the Jharkhand Legislative Assembly

Constituency details
- Country: India
- Region: East India
- State: Jharkhand
- District: Pakur
- Lok Sabha constituency: Rajmahal
- Established: 2000
- Total electors: 3,20,122
- Reservation: None

Member of Legislative Assembly
- 5th Jharkhand Legislative Assembly
- Incumbent Nisat Alam
- Party: INC
- Alliance: MGB
- Elected year: 2024

Pakur Assembly constituency is an assembly constituency in the Indian state of Jharkhand.

== Overview ==
Pakur Assembly constituency covers: Pakur Police Station in Pakur district; and Barharwa Police Station in Sahibganj district.

Pakur Assembly constituency is part of Rajmahal (Lok Sabha constituency).

== Members of the Legislative Assembly ==
Election	Member	Party
Bihar Legislative Assembly
1952	Jyotirmoyee Devi	Indian National Congress
1952	Ram Charan Kisku (Pakur Damin constituency)	Jharkhand Party
1957	Jyotirmoyee Devi	Indian National Congress
1957	Jitu Kisku	Indian National Congress
1962	Prasunandu Chandra Pandey	Janata Party
1967	B. N. Jha	Bharatiya Jana Sangh
1969	Syed Md. Jafar Ali	Indian National Congress
1972	Syed Md. Jafar Ali	Indian National Congress
1977	Haji Md. Ainul Haque	Indian National Congress
1980	Abdul Hakim	Communist Party of India
1985	Haji Md. Ainul Haque	Indian National Congress
1990	Beni Prasad Gupta	Bharatiya Janata Party
1995	Beni Prasad Gupta	Bharatiya Janata Party
2000	Alamgir Alam	Indian National Congress
Jharkhand Legislative Assembly
2005	Alamgir Alam	Indian National Congress
2009	Aquil Akhtar	Jharkhand Mukti Morcha
2014	Alamgir Alam	Indian National Congress
2019	Alamgir Alam	Indian National Congress
2024	Nisat Alam	Indian National Congress

== Election results ==
=== Assembly Election 2024 ===
2024 Jharkhand Legislative Assembly election: Pakur
Party	Candidate	Votes	%	±%
INC	Nisat Alam	155,827	52.27%	▲0.41
AJSU	Azhar Islam	69,798	23.41%	▲7.46
SP	Aquil Akhtar	47,039	15.78%	New
Independent	Mukesh Kumar Shukla	6,248	2.10%	New
CPI(M)	Sk Saifuddin	3,652	1.23%	▼0.15
Independent	Md Hanif	3,174	1.06%	New
Independent	Asraful Shekh	2,804	0.94%	New
NOTA	None of the Above	2,181	0.73%	▼0.34
Margin of victory		86,029	28.86%	▲2.52
Turnout		2,98,116	76.40%	▼0.83
Registered electors		3,90,206		▲21.89
INC hold		Swing	▲0.41	

=== Assembly Election 2019 ===
2019 Jharkhand Legislative Assembly election: Pakur
Party	Candidate	Votes	%	±%
INC	Alamgir Alam	128,218	51.86%	▲16.45
BJP	Veni Prasad Gupta	63,110	25.53%	▼1.87
AJSU	Aquil Akhtar	39,444	15.95%	New
CPI(M)	Mohammad Iqbal	3,394	1.37%	▼0.82
Independent	Alfred Edward Soren	3,073	1.24%	New
AITC	Asraful Shekh	1,886	0.76%	New
JVM(P)	Qamruddin Ansari	1,874	0.76%	▼0.42
NOTA	Nota	2,644	1.07%	▼0.17
Margin of victory		65,108	26.34%	▲18.66
Turnout		2,47,227	77.23%	▼3.53
Registered electors		3,20,122		▲9.85
INC hold		Swing	▲16.45	

=== Assembly Election 2014 ===
2014 Jharkhand Legislative Assembly election: Pakur
Party	Candidate	Votes	%	±%
INC	Alamgir Alam	83,338	35.41%	▲1.97
JMM	Akil Akhtar	65,272	27.73%	▼9.06
BJP	Ranjit Kumar Tiwary	64,479	27.40%	▲9.81
CPI(M)	Krishna Kant Mandal	5,170	2.20%	▼1.08
Independent	Shyam Chand Mandal	2,952	1.25%	New
JVM(P)	Asmannara Khatun	2,776	1.18%	New
Independent	Anand Turi	1,553	0.66%	New
NOTA	None of the Above	2,920	1.24%	New
Margin of victory		18,066	7.68%	▲4.32
Turnout		2,35,344	80.76%	▲8.13
Registered electors		2,91,418		▲25.12
INC gain from JMM		Swing	▼1.39	

=== Assembly Election 2009 ===
2009 Jharkhand Legislative Assembly election: Pakur
Party	Candidate	Votes	%	±%
JMM	Aquil Akhtar	62,246	36.80%	New
INC	Alamgir Alam	56,570	33.44%	▼14.65
BJP	Sanjeev Kumar	29,748	17.59%	▼13.26
CPI(M)	Md. Sabiruddin	5,550	3.28%	▼6.62
Independent	Beni Prasad Gupta	3,854	2.28%	New
Independent	Shiv Charan Hansda	3,557	2.10%	New
RJD	Md. Muslim Hussain	1,919	1.13%	New
Margin of victory		5,676	3.36%	▼13.90
Turnout		1,69,149	72.63%	▲5.12
Registered electors		2,32,903		▲5.41
JMM gain from INC		Swing	▼11.30	

=== Assembly Election 2005 ===
2005 Jharkhand Legislative Assembly election: Pakur
Party	Candidate	Votes	%	±%
INC	Alamgir Alam	71,736	48.10%	▲4.15
BJP	Beni Prasad Gupta	46,000	30.84%	▼0.44
CPI(M)	Mohammad Iqbal	14,773	9.91%	▼6.85
SP	Shahnaz Begum	7,030	4.71%	New
Independent	Shyam Chand Mandal	2,459	1.65%	New
BSP	Hari Gopal Das	1,599	1.07%	▲0.08
JDP	Betka Marandi	1,291	0.87%	New
Margin of victory		25,736	17.26%	▲4.59
Turnout		1,49,146	67.50%	▲4.73
Registered electors		2,20,945		▲23.84
INC hold		Swing	▲4.15	

=== Assembly Election 2000 ===
2000 Bihar Legislative Assembly election: Pakur
Party	Candidate	Votes	%	±%
INC	Alamgir Alam	49,218	43.95%	New
BJP	Veni Prasad Gupta	35,033	31.28%	New
CPI(M)	Mohammad Iqbal	18,767	16.76%	New
JMM	Shyam Yadav	6,706	5.99%	New
BSP	Md. Equbal	1,108	0.99%	New
Margin of victory		14,185	12.67%	
Turnout		1,11,986	63.30%	
Registered electors		1,78,407		
INC win (new seat)				

== See also ==
- Pakur block
- Barharwa (community development block)
- List of states of India by type of legislature
