= Nisat Alam =

Indian politician

Member of the Jharkhand Legislative Assembly
- Incumbent
- Assumed office 23 November 2024
- Preceded by: Alamgir Alam
- Constituency: Pakur

Personal details
- Party: Indian National Congress
- Spouse: Alamgir Alam
- Profession: Politician

Nisat Alam is an Indian politician from Jharkhand. She is a member of the Jharkhand Legislative Assembly from 2024, representing Pakur Assembly constituency as a member of the Indian National Congress. She is the wife of Congress leader Alamgir Alam.

== See also ==
- List of chief ministers of Jharkhand
- Maharashtra Legislative Assembly
