= Pakur =

Pakur Pakur
- Town
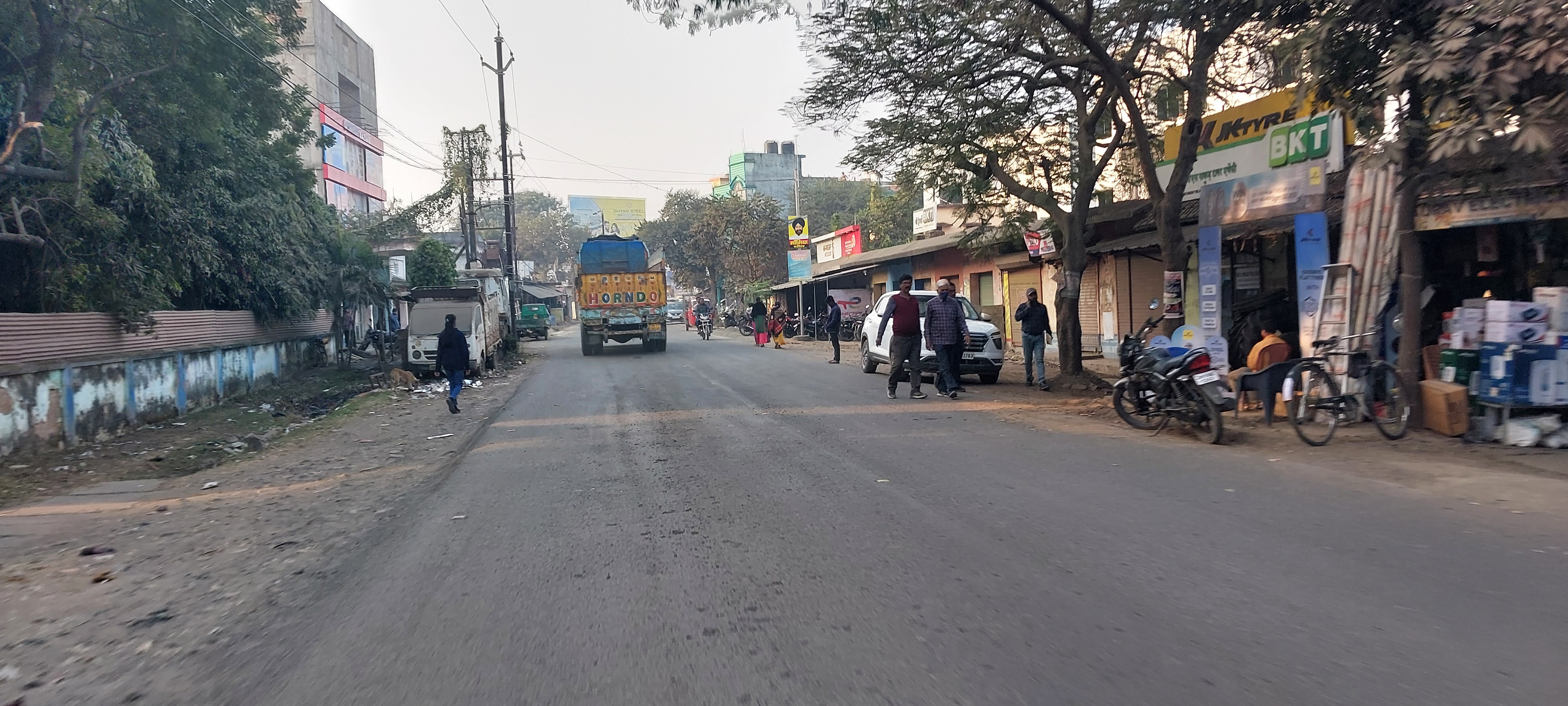
- Pakur town

- Location in Jharkhand, India Pakur (India)
- Coordinates: 24.63°N 87.85°E
- Country: India
- State: Jharkhand
- District: Pakur

Area
  - Total: 11.08 km^{2} (4.28 sq mi)

Population (2011)
  - Total: 45,840
  - Density: 4,137/km^{2} (10,720/sq mi)

Languages(*For language details see Pakur block#Language and religion)
  - Official: Hindi, Bengali, Santali, Urdu
  - Regional: Mondarika-Maithili
- Time zone: UTC+5:30 (IST)
- PIN: 816107
- Telephone code: +91-06435
- Vehicle registration: JH-16
- Website: www.pakur.nic.in

Pakur (previously known as Pakaur) is a town with a nagar palika in the Pakur subdivision of the Pakur district, Jharkhand state, India.

== History ==
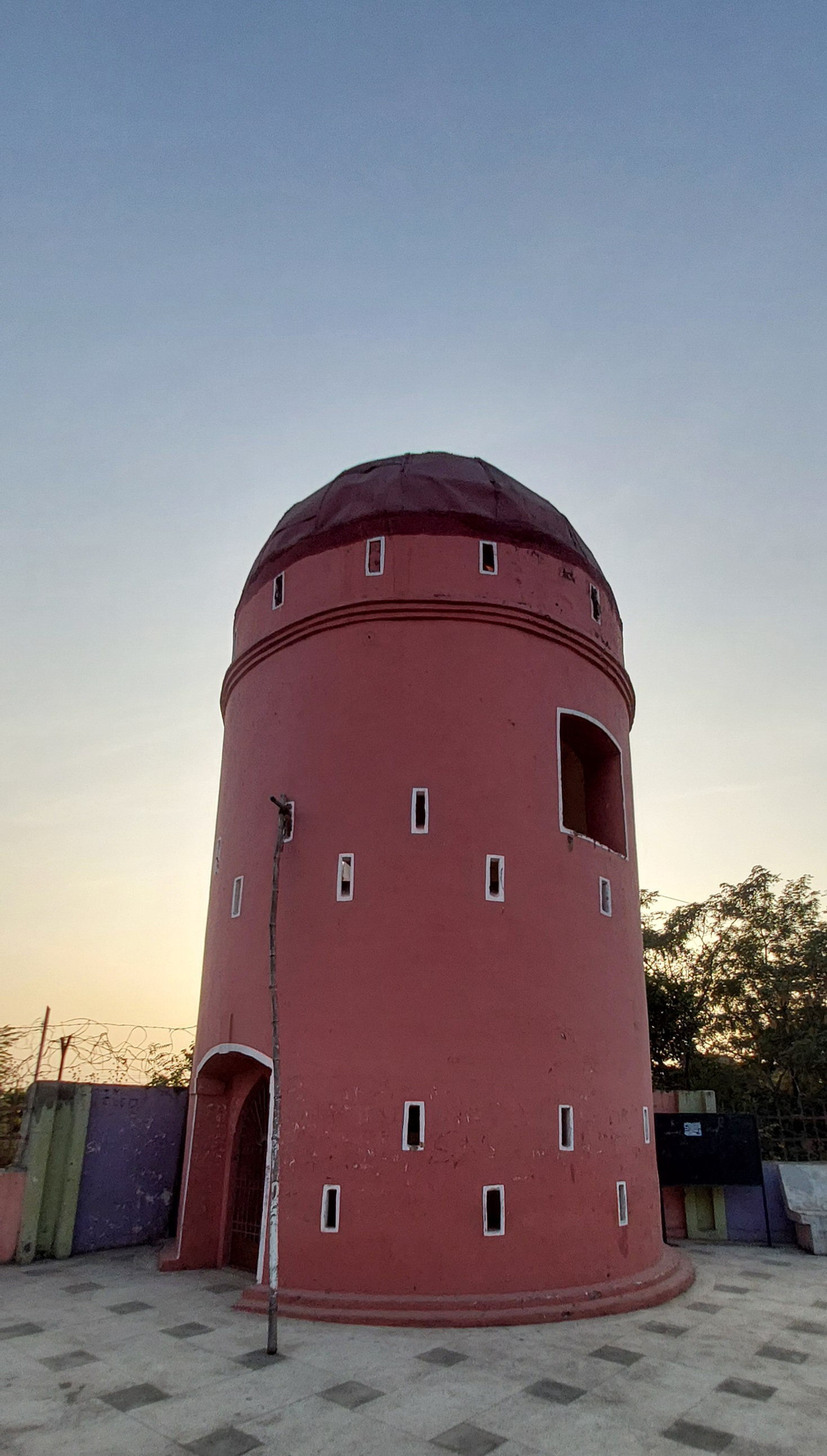
Martello tower at Pakur, built to fend off the Santhal rebellion

Pakur was earlier a Sub-Division of Santhal Parganas district of Bihar. It was upgraded to the status of district on 28 January 1994. Upon reorganization of Bihar state, India, in 2000 into two separate states, namely, Bihar and Jharkhand, Pakur district came under the administrative control of the Jharkhand state.

== Geography ==
Cities, towns and locations in the Sahibganj, Godda and Pakur districts in Santhal Pargana Division
M: municipality, CT: census town, R: rural/ urban centre, H: historical/ religious/ tourist centre
Owing to space constraints in the small map, the actual locations in a larger map may vary slightly

=== Location ===
Pakur is located at 24.63°N 87.85°E

Pakur has an area of 11.08 square kilometres (4.28 sq mi).

=== Overview ===
The map shows a hilly area with the Rajmahal hills running from the bank of the Ganges in the extreme north to south, beyond the area covered by the map into Dumka district. ‘Farakka’ is marked on the map and that is where Farakka Barrage is, just inside West Bengal. Rajmahal coalfield is shown in the map. The entire area is overwhelmingly rural with only small pockets of urbanisation.

== Politics ==
District	No.	Constituency	Name	Party	Alliance	Remarks	Pakur	4	Litipara	Hemlal Murmu
5	Pakur	Nisat Alam		INC			Pakur			
6	Maheshpur	Stephen Marandi		JMM			Pakur			

== Demographics ==
Religions in Pakaur town
Religion	Percent
Hindus	66.71%
Muslims	28.09%
Christians	3.12%
Others	1.20%

According to the 2011 Census of India, Pakur had a total population of 45,840, of which 23,653 (52%) were males and 22,167 (48%) were females. Population in the age range 0–6 years was 6,352. The total number of literate persons in Pakur was 39,488 (77.60% of the population over 6 years).

== Infrastructure ==
According to the District Census Handbook 2011, Pakur, Pakur covered an area of 11.08 km^{2}. Among the civic amenities, it had 34.2 km roads with open drains, the protected water supply involved hand pump, tap water from untreated sources, overhead tanks. It had 7,704 domestic electric connections, 443 road light points. Among the medical facilities, it had 4 hospitals, 2 dispensaries, 2 health centres, 1 family welfare centre, 1 maternity and child welfare centre, 1 maternity home, 1 TB hospital/ clinic, 2 nursing homes, 1 charitable hospital/ nursing home, 1 veterinary hospital, 26 medicine shops. Among the educational facilities it had 33 primary schools, 19 middle schools, 4 secondary schools, 4 senior secondary schools, 1 general degree college, 2 recognised shorthand typewriting and vocational training institutions, 1 non-formal education centre (Sarva Shiksha Abhiyan). Among the social, cultural and recreational facilities, it had 2 stadiums, 2 cinema theatres, 5 auditorium/ community halls, 1 public library, 1 reading room. Three important commodities it manufactured were bidi, stone crusher machine, bakery products. It had the branch offices of 11 nationalised banks, 4 private commercial bank, 1 cooperative bank, 3 agricultural credit societies.

== Economy ==
One of the main businesses of the city is mining and crushing. It is also known for the manufacturing of crushing and screening equipment. Pakur is also the place where the first indigenous Jaw Crusher was manufactured by Bhagwati Prasad Agarwalla.

Since last decade there has been an enormous activity of coal excavation in the area as well. It has one of the biggest reserves of coal in the world. Currently only one block of coal is active in the region. It has been allotted to the Punjab State Government for their captive Thermal Power Plants. The excavation work on behalf of the Punjab State Government is being done by Panem, a public–private joint venture between the Punjab State Electricity Board and EMTA Group.

== Tourist Places ==
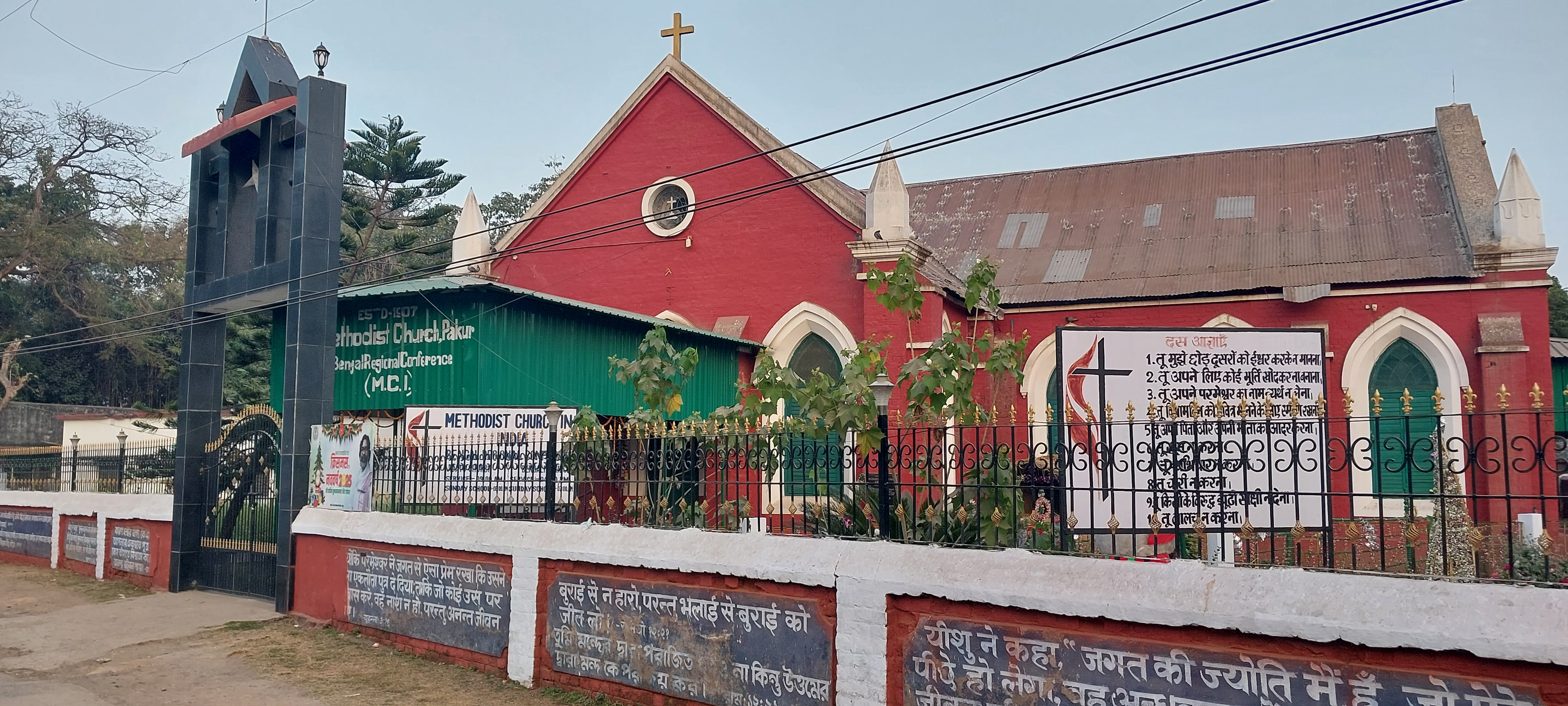
Pakur Methodist Church established in 1907

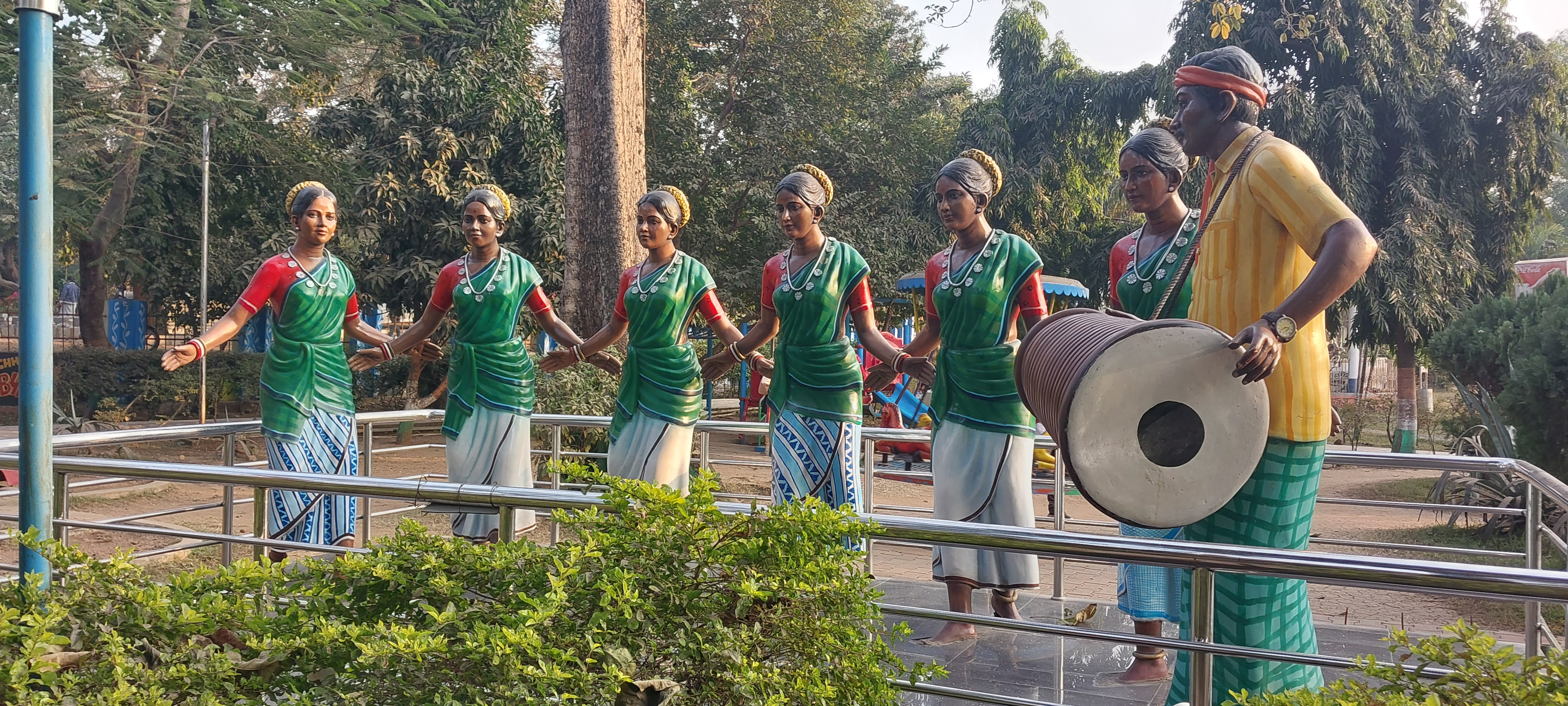
Sidho Kanho Murmu Park

- Martello Tower: Martello towers, simply known as Martellos, are small defensive forts built across the British Empire during the 19th century. It is the most famous historical structure in the town of Pakur. The tower was built to fend off the Santhal rebellion in 1857 by the British colonialists - an upright concrete tower-like architecture with a glass roof. There is room for armed personnel to stand and fire at the Santhal rebels.
- Dharni Pahar: The temple is about 20 km away from Pakur district headquarters in the southwest direction. Tourists can find an ancient temple dedicated to Lord Shiva at the top of the hill. A yearly fair is hosted every year during the festival of Maha-Shivratri. It is not only a holy place but also a famous picnic spot in the lush green area. You can also enjoy the beautiful wildflowers on the hill.
- Nitya Kali Mandir: It is situated in the north middle of Pakur Town on the campus of Pakur Rajbari. It is a very old temple of Pakur. People come in numbers every day to pay their floral offerings to Goddess Kali with great devotion. The statue of Goddess Kali is engraved on a big black stone. Pakur Railway station is only 2 km away from the temple.
- Kanchangarh Cave: Located on the top of the hill, Kanchangarh Cave is situated in the deep forest at a distance of 18 km from Littipara Block. Shivlings are found inside the cave. Devotees flock around the cave every day to offer puja to the god. The oval-shaped structure near the hill has a very strange sound while echoing. The structure is said to be the site of the ruling Paharia king in this region. The view from the top of the hill is majestic as it offers a beautiful view of the town from there.

== Transport ==
Pakur Railway Station is located on the Sahibganj Loop. Bus stand also located at Bari Aliganj which are connected with all Jharkhand and Bengal, Bihar.

== Education ==
Pakur has educational institutions offering all levels of education, including Pakur Raj High School (Estd. 20 December 1859), Kumar Kalidas Memorial College, and 2 Jawahar Navodaya Vidyalaya.

Pakur has a Polytechnic Institute owned by the Jharkhand Department of Higher Technical Education and Skill Development. The Polytechnic Institute is approved by AICTE and SBTE. The college is spread in 7.1 acres with more than 2.0 Lakhs built up area with all amenities (Including boys and girls hostel).

RNS Academy at Bari Aliganj Pakur provides physical training for potential recruits of defense services such as the Indian Army, police, etc.
