= Pakur district =

Coordinates: 24°37′48″N 87°51′00″E

- District of Jharkhand
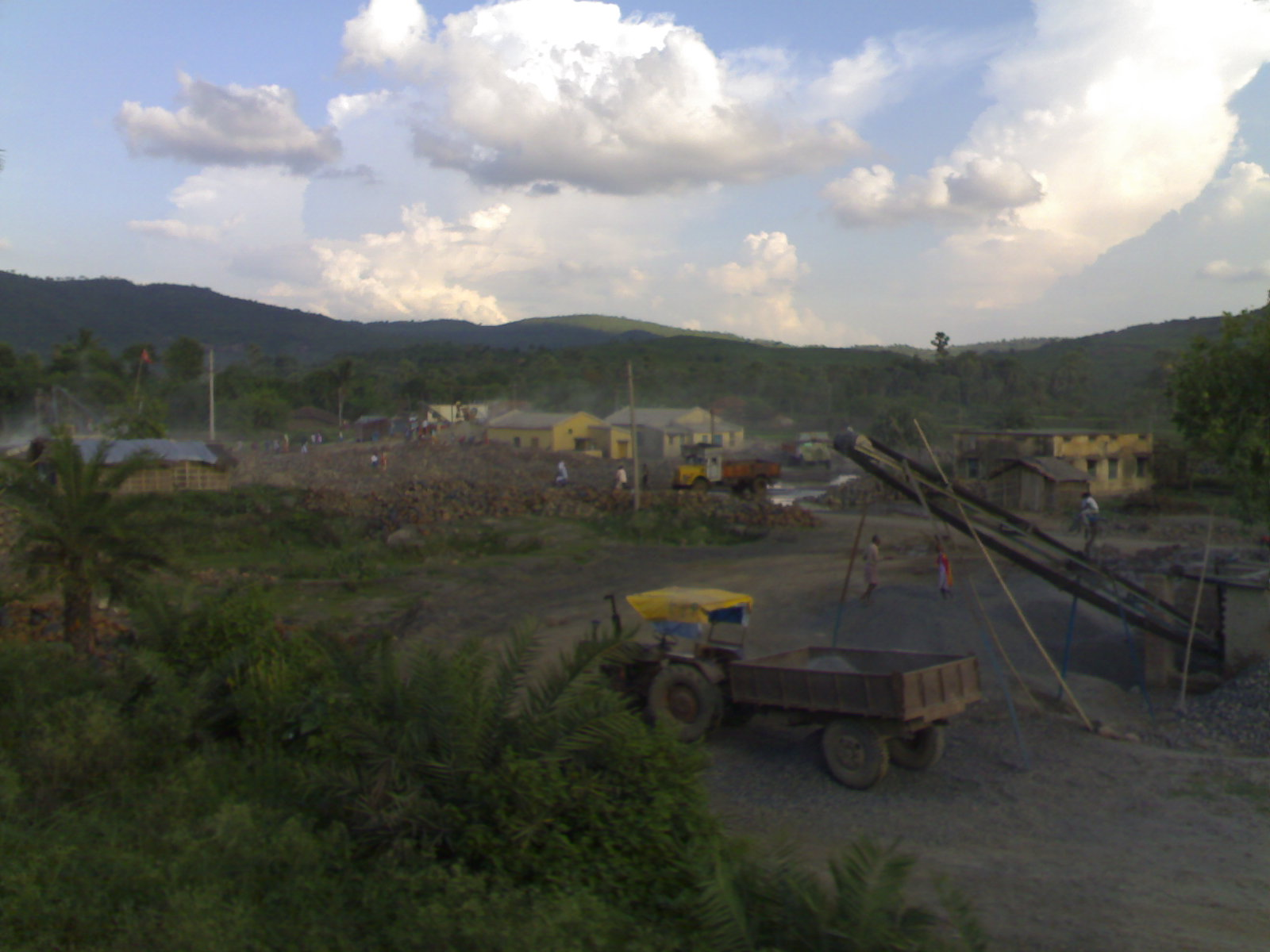
- A stone-quarrying unit in Pakur district
- Interactive map of Pakur district
- Country: India
- State: Jharkhand
- Division: Santhal Pargana
- Headquarters: Pakur

Government
  - Deputy Commissioner: Shri. Manish Kumar (IAS)
  - Lok Sabha constituencies: Rajmahal (shared with Sahebganj district)
  - Vidhan Sabha constituencies: 3

Area
  - Total: 1,805.59 km^{2} (697.14 sq mi)

Population (2011)
  - Total: 900,422
  - Density: 498.686/km^{2} (1,291.59/sq mi)
  - Urban: 5.13%

Demographics
  - Literacy: 48.82 per cent
  - Sex ratio: 989
- Time zone: UTC+05:30 (IST)
- Website: pakur.nic.in

Pakur district is one of the twenty-four districts of Jharkhand state, India, and Pakur is the administrative headquarters of this district. Pakur sub-division of Sahibganj district was carved out on 28 January 1994 to constitute Pakur District. The district, with a population of 900,422 (census 2011), and covering an area of 686.21 km^{2}, Pakur District is in the northeastern corner of Jharkhand State.

== Geography ==
The district is bounded on the north by Sahibganj district, on the south by Dumka district, on the west by Godda district, and on the east by Birbhum and Murshidabad districts of West Bengal. The west of the district contains the Rajmahal Hills, while the east of the district is mostly flat plain.

== Economy ==
It is famous for its Black stone. It is generating the highest revenue for Howrah railway Division by supplying Black Stone Chips across India and Coal to Punjab.

In the past, Pakur was a land populated by Santhals and Mal Paharia people. However, over a period of time, demographic composition has gradually changed to the modern era, and the local folks have come to the mainstream of the Indian society.

In 2006 the Ministry of Panchayati Raj named Pakur one of the country's 250 most backward districts (out of a total of 640). It is one of the 21 districts in Jharkhand currently receiving funds from the Backward Regions Grant Fund Programme (BRGF).

== Administration ==
=== Blocks/Mandals ===
Pakur district consists of six community development blocks. The following are the list of the blocks in the Pakur district:

1. Pakur block
2. Maheshpur block
3. Hiranpur block
4. Littipara block
5. Amrapara block
6. Pakuria block

== Demographics ==
Historical population
Year	Pop.	±% p.a.
1901	215,587	—
1911	224,304	+0.40%
1921	214,299	−0.46%
1931	244,945	+1.35%
1941	266,956	+0.86%
1951	277,421	+0.39%
1961	347,012	+2.26%
1971	403,078	+1.51%
1981	464,154	+1.42%
1991	564,253	+1.97%
2001	701,664	+2.20%
2011	900,422	+2.53%

Religions in Pakur district (2011)
Religion	Percent
Hinduism	45.55%
Islam	35.87%
Sarna	9.86%
Christianity	8.43%
Other or not stated	0.29%

CD Block	Hindu %	Muslim %	Other %
Pakur	29.59	64.38	6.04
Maheshpur	54.51	27.06	18.43
Hiranpur	56.92	27.35	15.82
Littipara	52.13	11.58	36.29
Amrapara	70.30	3.42	36.28
Pakuria	46.42	16.47	37.10

According to the 2011 census Pakur district has a population of 900,422, roughly equal to the nation of Fiji. This gives it a ranking of 465th in India (out of a total of 640). The district has a population density of 498 inhabitants per square kilometre (1,290/sq mi). Its population growth rate over the decade 2001-2011 was 28.15%. Pakur has a sex ratio of 985 females for every 1000 males, and a literacy rate of 48.82%. 7.50% of the population lives in ruban areas. Scheduled Castes and Scheduled Tribes make up 3.16% and 42.10% of the population respectively.

Languages of Pakur district (2011)
1. Bengali (39.4%)
2. Santali (36.4%)
3. Khortha (11.8%)
4. Malto (4.90%)
5. Hindi (2.83%)
6. Urdu (1.77%)
7. Bhojpuri (1.66%)
8. Others (1.18%)

At the time of the 2011 Census of India, 39.42% of the population in the district spoke Bengali, 36.40% Santali, 11.84% Khortha, 4.90% Malto, 2.83% Hindi, 1.77% Urdu and 1.66% Bhojpuri as their first language.

== Villages ==
- Ramnathpur

== Politics ==
District	No.	Constituency	Name	Party	Alliance	Remarks	Pakur	4	Litipara	Hemlal Murmu
5	Pakur	Nisat Alam		INC			Pakur			
6	Maheshpur	Stephen Marandi		JMM			Pakur			

== See also ==
- Districts of Jharkhand
