= Devipur =

Devipur may refer to:

- Devipur, Deoghar, a community development block in Deoghar district, Jharkhand, India
- Devipur, Deoghar (village), a village in Jharkhand, India
- Devipur, Siraha, a village development committee in Siraha District, Sagarmatha Zone, Nepal

== See also ==
- Devipuram, a Hindu temple complex near Visakhapatnam, Andhra Pradesh, India
- Debipur (disambiguation)
- Devapur, Yadgir, Karnataka, India
