= Debipur =

Debipur may refer to:

- Debipur, Bangladesh
- Debipur, India
- Debipur, West Bengal
- Debipur, Murshidabad

== See also ==
- Devipur (disambiguation)
