= Sarath, Deoghar (village) =

Sarath
- Village
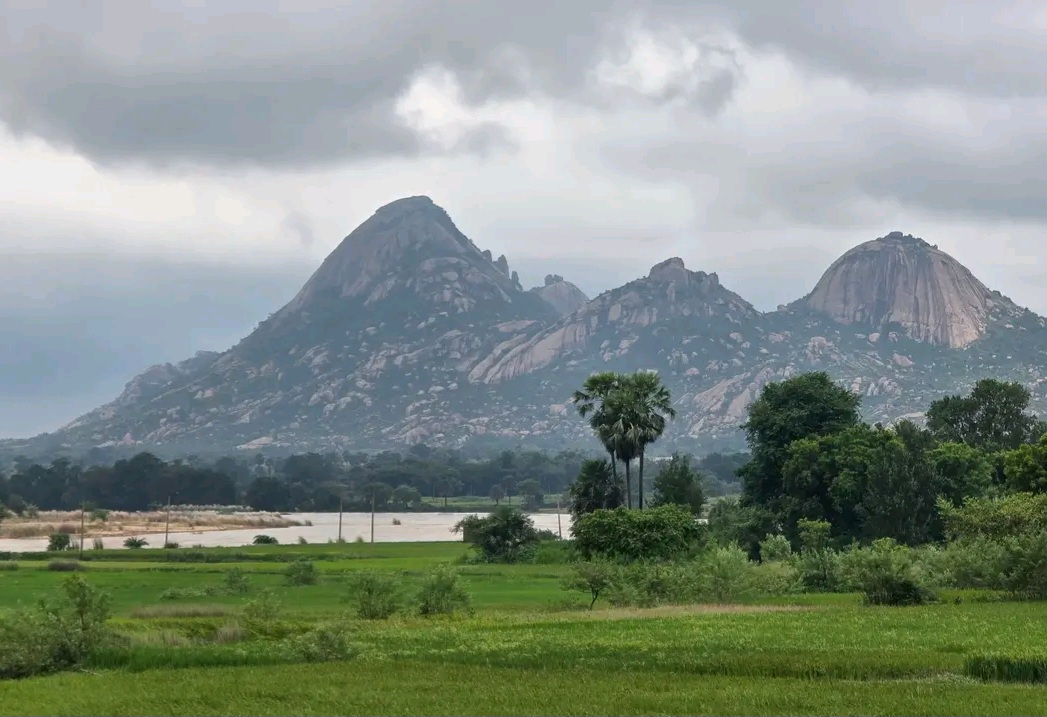
- Patharda Hill in Sarath

- Location in Jharkhand, India Sarath (India)
- Coordinates: 24.23667°N 86.83778°E
- Country: India
- State: Jharkhand
- District: Deoghar

Population (2011)
  - Total: 5,692

Languages .*For language details see Sarath, Deoghar#Language and religion
  - Official: Hindi, Urdu
- Time zone: UTC+5:30 (IST)
- PIN: 814149
- Telephone/ STD code: 06438
- Lok Sabha constituency: Dumka
- Vidhan Sabha constituency: Sarath
- Website: deoghar.nic.in

Sarath is a village in Sarath CD block in the Madhupur subdivision of the Deoghar district in the Indian state of Jharkhand.

== Geography ==
Cities, towns and locations in the Deoghar, Dumka and Jamtara districts in Santhal Pargana Division
M: Municipality, CT: census town, R: Rural/ Urban centre, D: Dam,
Owing to space constraints in the small map, the actual locations in a larger map may vary slightly

=== Location ===
Sarath is located at 24.23667°N 86.83778°E.

=== Overview ===
The map shows a large area, which is a plateau with low hills, except in the eastern portion where the Rajmahal hills intrude into this area and the Ramgarh hills are there. The south-western portion is just a rolling upland. The area is overwhelmingly rural with only small pockets of urbanisation.

Note: The full screen map is interesting. All places marked on the map are linked in the full screen map and one can easily move on to another page of his/her choice. Enlarge the full screen map to see what else is there – one gets railway connections, many more road connections and so on.

=== Area ===
Sarath has an area of 408 hectares (1,010 acres).

== Demographics ==
According to the 2011 Census of India, Sarath had a population of 5,692, of which 2,981 (52%) were males and 2,711 (48%) were females. Population in the age range 0–6 years was 1,010. The total number of literate persons in Sarath was 4,682 (71.61% of the population over 6 years).

== Civic administration ==
=== Police station ===
There is a police station at Sarath.

=== CD block HQ ===
Headquarters of Sarath CD block is at Sarath village.

== Education ==
Kasturba Gandhi Balika Vidyalaya, Sarath, is a Hindi-medium girls only institution established in 2006. It has facilities for teaching from class VI to class XII.

High School Gopibandh is a Hindi-medium coeducational institution established in 1980. It has facilities for teaching from class VI to class X.
