= Mohanpur, Deoghar (village) =

Mohanpur
- Village
- Location in Jharkhand, India Mohanpur (India)
- Coordinates: 24.494722°N 86.780278°E
- Country: India
- State: Jharkhand
- District: Deoghar

Population (2011)
  - Total: 177

Languages (.*For language details see Mohanpur, Deoghar#Language and religion)
  - Official: Hindi, Urdu
- Time zone: UTC+5:30 (IST)
- PIN: 814157
- Telephone/ STD code: 06432
- Lok Sabha constituency: Godda
- Vidhan Sabha constituency: Deoghar
- Website: deoghar.nic.in

Mohanpur is a village in Mohanpur CD block in the Deoghar subdivision of the Deoghar district in the Indian state of Jharkhand.

== Geography ==
Cities, towns and locations in the Deoghar, Dumka and Jamtara districts in Santhal Pargana Division
M: Municipality, CT: census town, R: Rural/ Urban centre, D: Dam,
Owing to space constraints in the small map, the actual locations in a larger map may vary slightly

=== Location ===
Mohanpur is located at 24.494722°N 86.780278°E.

=== Overview ===
The map shows a large area, which is a plateau with low hills, except the eastern portion where the Rajmahal hills intrude into this area and the Ramgarh hills are there. The south-western portion is just a rolling upland. The area is overwhelmingly rural with only small pockets of urbanisation.

Note: The full screen map is interesting. All places marked on the map are linked in the full screen map and one can easily move on to another page of his/her choice. Enlarge the full screen map to see what else is there – one gets railway connections, many more road connections and so on.

=== Area ===
Mohanpur has an area of 6 hectares (15 acres).

== Demographics ==
According to the 2011 Census of India, Mohanpur had a total population of 177, of which 97 (55%) were males and 80 (45%) were females. Population in the age range 0–6 years was 32. The total number of literate persons in Mohanpur was 145 (48.28% of the population over 6 years).

== Civic administration ==
=== Police station ===
There is a police station at Mohanpur village.

=== CD block HQ ===
Headquarters of Mohanpur CD block is at Mohanpur village.

== Transport ==
There is a station at Mohanpur on the Jasidih-Dumka-Rampurhat line.

== Education ==
Kasturba Gandhi Balika Vidyalaya, Mohanpur, at Chakrama, is a Hindi-medium girls only institution established in 2005. It has facilities for teaching from class VI to class XII.
