= Madhupur subdivision =

- Subdivision
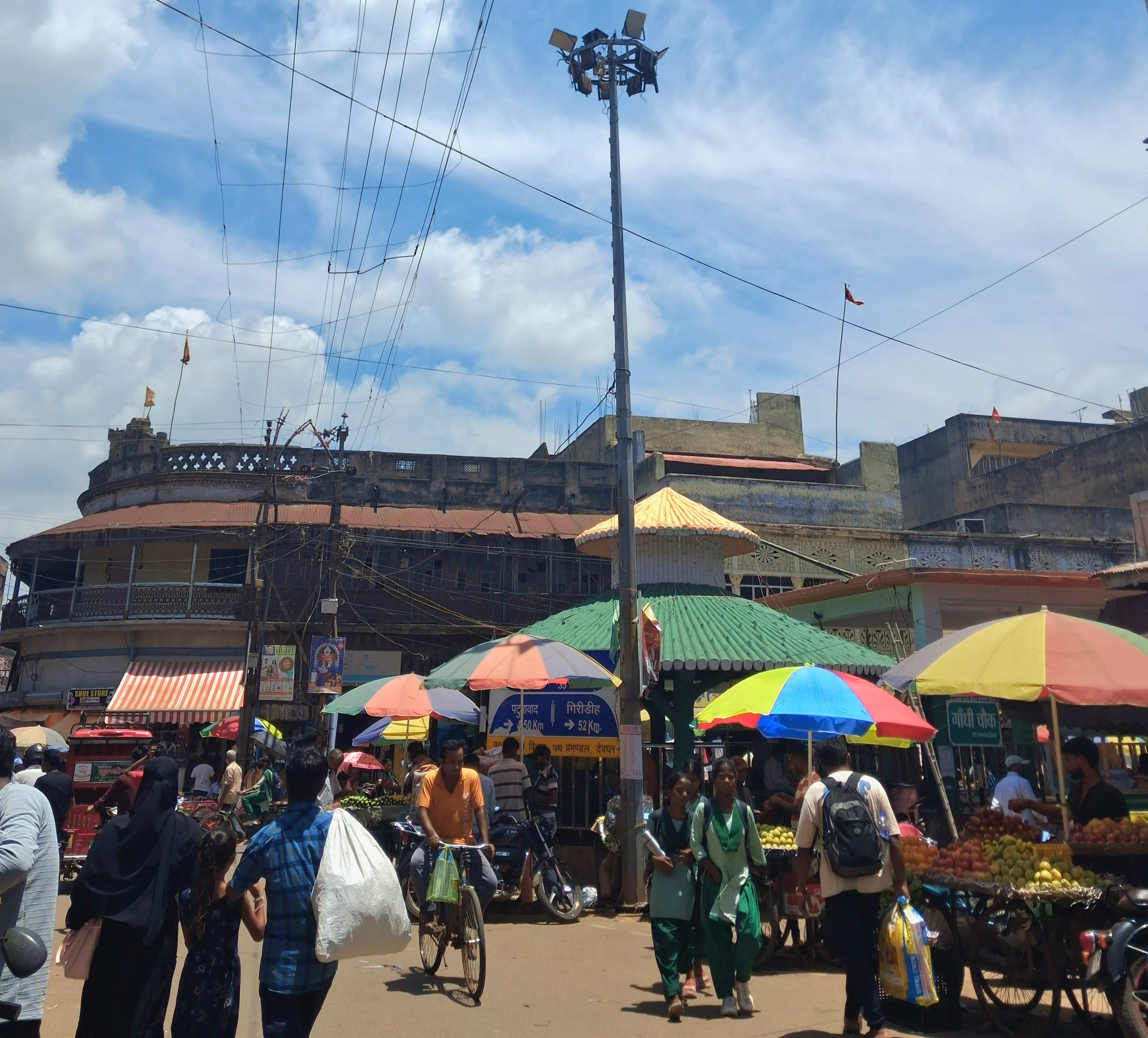
- Gandhi Chowk, a prominent landmark in the town

- Location in Jharkhand, India Madhupur subdivision (India)
- Coordinates: 24.26°N 86.65°E
- Country: India
- State: Jharkhand
- District: Deoghar
- Headquarters: Madhupur

Government
  - Type: Municipality
  - Body: Madhupur Municipality
  - Sub-Divisional Magistrate: Shri Rajiv Kumar, (JAS)
  - Deputy Superintendent of Police (S.D.P.O): Shri Satyendra Prasad, (JPS)

Area
  - Total: 1,199.60 km^{2} (463.17 sq mi)

Population
  - Total: 696,251
  - Density: 580.403/km^{2} (1,503.24/sq mi)

Languages
  - Official: Hindi, Santali
- Time zone: UTC+5:30 (IST)
- Vehicle registration: JH-15
- Website: deoghar.nic.in

Madhupur subdivision is an administrative subdivision of the Deoghar district in the Santhal Pargana division in the state of Jharkhand, India.

== History ==
As a result of the Santhal rebellion, Act XXXVII of 1855 was passed by the British Raj, and a separate district called Santhal Pargana was carved out of parts of Birbhum and Bhagalpur districts. Santhal Pargana had four sub-districts – Dumka, Godda, Deoghar and Rajmahal. Subsequently, Santal Pargana district comprised Dumka, Deoghar, Sahibganj, Godda, Pakur and Jamtara sub-divisions. In 1983 Deoghar, Sahibganj and Godda subdivisions were given district status.

== Administrative set up ==
Deoghar district has two subdivisions: Deoghar and Madhupur. Madhupur, Margomunda, Karon, Sarath, Palojori community development blocks and Madhupur town are in Madhupur subdivision.

The overall administration of Madhupur subdivision is headed by the Sub-divisional Officer (SDO), also known as the Sub-Divisional Magistrate (SDM), who is typically an officer the Indian Administrative Service (IAS) or Jharkhand Administrative Service (JAS), appointed by Jharkhand state government. The SDM acts as the chief executive magistrate of the subdivision and is responsible for maintaining law and order, overseeing revenue collection, and coordinating various government departments and development schemes within the region. The office plays a crucial role in ensuring effective governance at the sub-district level and acts as a vital link between the district administration and the local bodies.

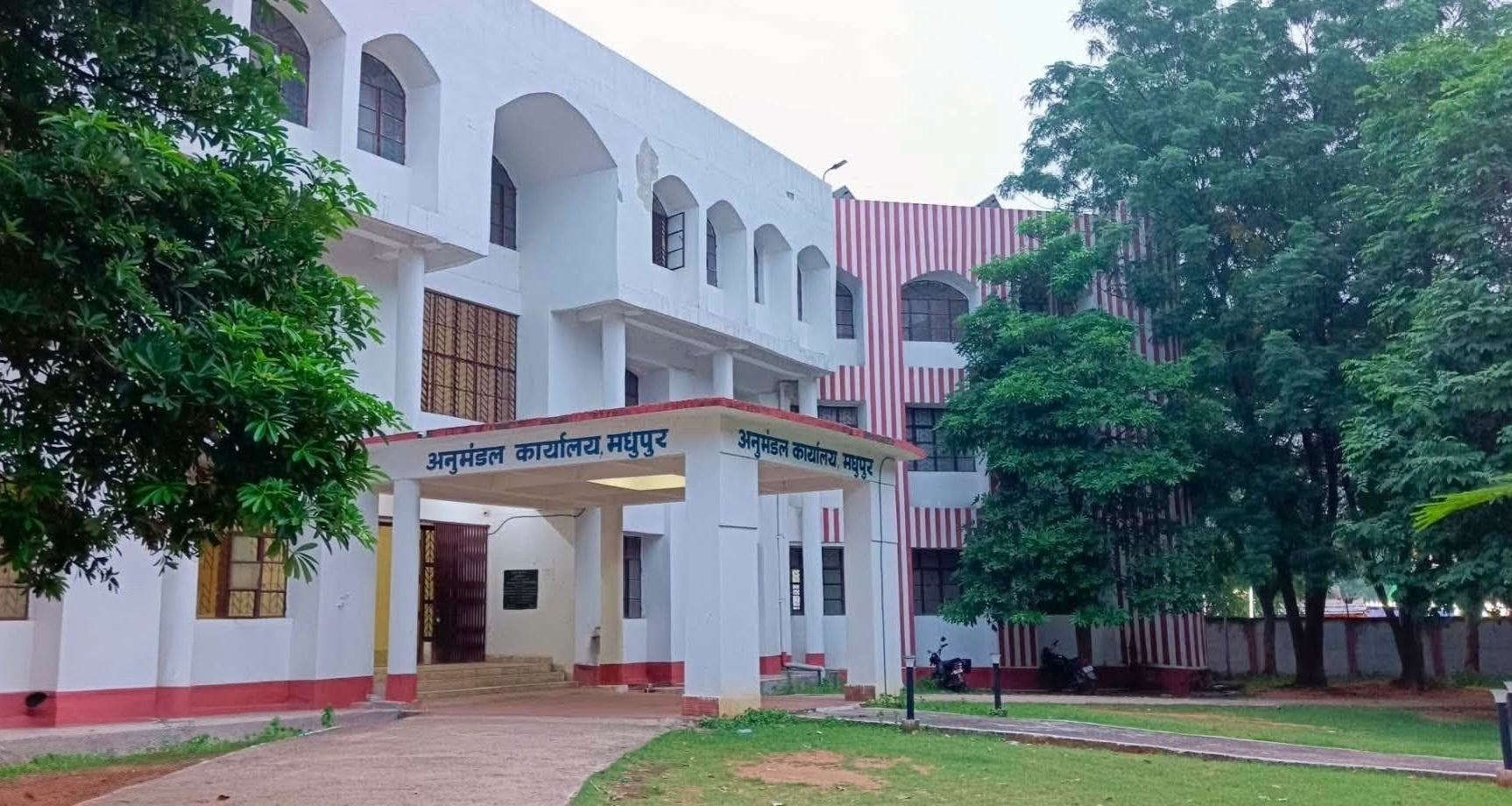
Madhupur Sub-Divisional Office

Within the subdivision, Madhupur Municipality functions as the key urban local body governing the subdivision, overseeing civic administration and infrastructure in the town of Madhupur and its nearby area. It manages services like water supply, sanitation, waste management and local roads across 23 wards and also handles key documents like issuing birth and death certificates, trade licenses, tax collection, building permissions and other statutory work.

Note: The website of the district administration mentions two subdivisions with their names, but does not mention the names of the CD blocks in each subdivision. The District Census Handbook, Deoghar, mentions only 8 CD blocks (4 in each subdivision), and leaves out 2 CD blocks. According to the map of the district, among the two left out blocks, it seems logical that Sonaraithari CD block is in Deoghar subdivision and Margomunda CD block is in Madhupur subdivision.

Deoghar district has two subdivisions:

Subdivision	Headquarters	Area km^{2}	Population (2011)	Rural population % (2011)	Urban population % (2011)
Deoghar	Deoghar	1,346.26	795,822	74.48	25.52
Madhupur	Madhupur	1,199.60	696,251	92.07	7.93

Cities, towns and locations in the Deoghar, Dumka and Jamtara districts in Santhal Pargana Division
M: Municipality, CT: census town, R: Rural/ Urban centre, D: Dam,
Owing to space constraints in the small map, the actual locations in a larger map may vary slightly

== Demographics ==
According to the 2011 Census of India data, Madhupur subdivision, in Deoghar district, had a total population of 696,251. There were 358,608 (52%) males and 337,643 (48%) females. Scheduled castes numbered 77,962 (11.20%) and scheduled tribes numbered 101,443 (14.57%). Literacy rate was 46.28%.

See also – List of Jharkhand districts ranked by literacy rate

== Police stations ==
Police stations in Madhupur subdivision are at:

1. Madhupur
2. Madhupur Mahila
3. Chitra
4. Margomunda
5. Palojori
6. Sarath

== Blocks ==
Community development blocks in Madhupur subdivision are:

CD Block	Headquarters	Area km^{2}	Population (2011)	SC %	ST %	Literacy rate %	CT
Madhupur	Madhupur	253.59	135,510	15.25	14.96	59.57	-
Margomunda	Margomunda	155.09	86,733	3.71	21.69	58.46	-
Karon	Karon	157.21	88,251	12.48	14.37	59.61	-
Sarath	Sarath	318.45	169,238	14.99	1.37	62.63	-
Palojori	Palojori	303.22	161,281	7.30	28.02	60.27	-

== Education ==
In 2011, in the CD blocks of Madhupur subdivision out of a total 1,083 inhabited villages there were 198 villages with pre-primary schools, 763 villages with primary schools, 273 villages with middle schools, 30 villages with secondary schools, 13 villages with senior secondary schools, 2 villages with non-formal training centres, 306 villages with no educational facility.
.*Senior secondary schools are also known as Inter colleges in Jharkhand

== Healthcare ==
In 2011, in the CD blocks of Madhupur subdivision there were 19 villages with primary health centres, 70 villages with primary health subcentres, 12 villages with maternity and child welfare centres, 17 villages with allopathic hospitals, 13 villages with dispensaries, 2 villages with veterinary hospitals, 6 villages with family welfare centres, 114 villages with medicine shops.
.*Private medical practitioners, alternative medicine etc. not included

== Transport ==
=== Airport ===
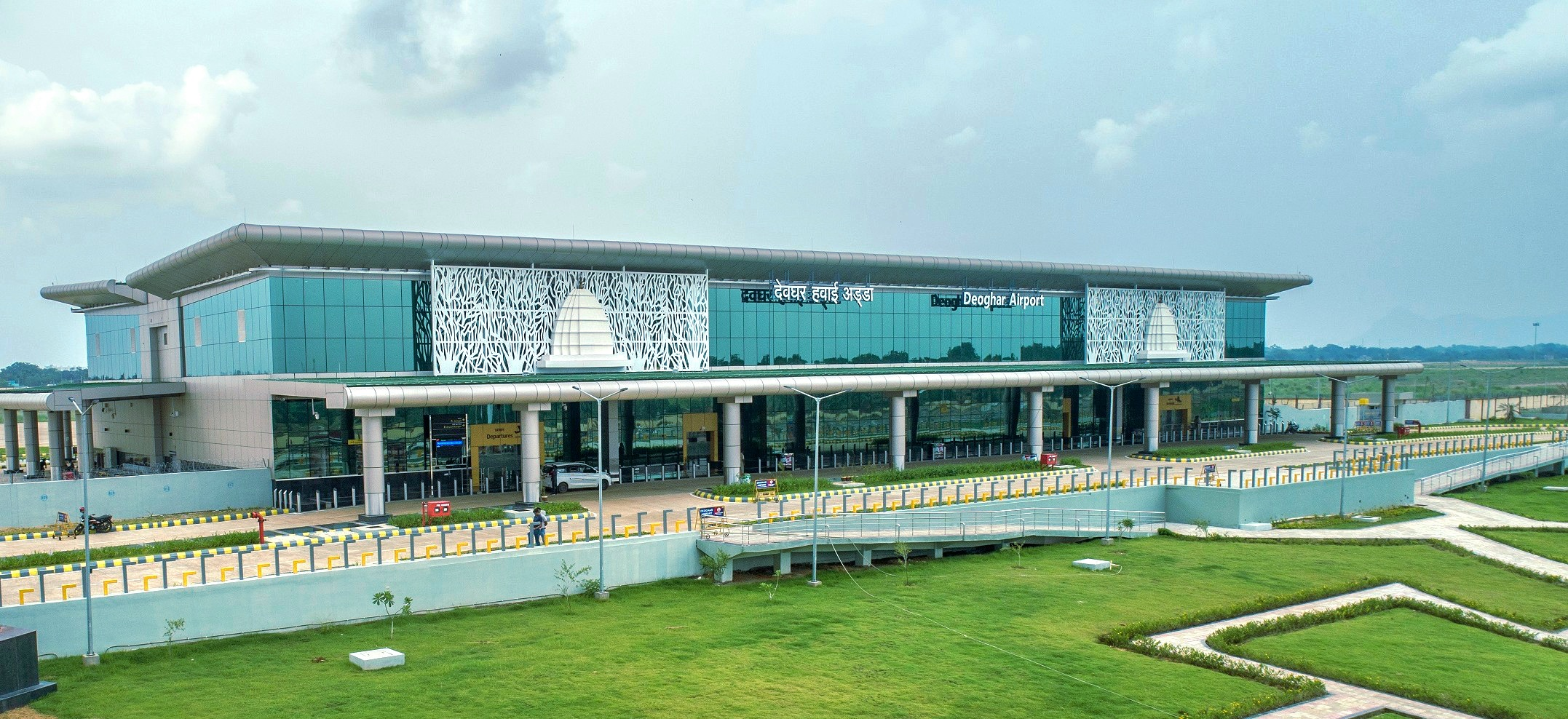
Terminal building of Deoghar Airport

Deoghar Airport (IATA: DGH, ICAO: VEDO), is the closet domestic airport located approximately 31 km (19 mi) from the Madhupur. The airport was inaugurated by Prime Minister Narendra Modi on July 12, 2022. As of now IndiGo operates its flight services only for Delhi, Kolkata, Mumbai, Ranchi, Patna and Banglore. The nearest international airport is Netaji Subhash Chandra Bose International Airport in Kolkata which is located 294 km (182 mi) from the town.

=== Highways ===
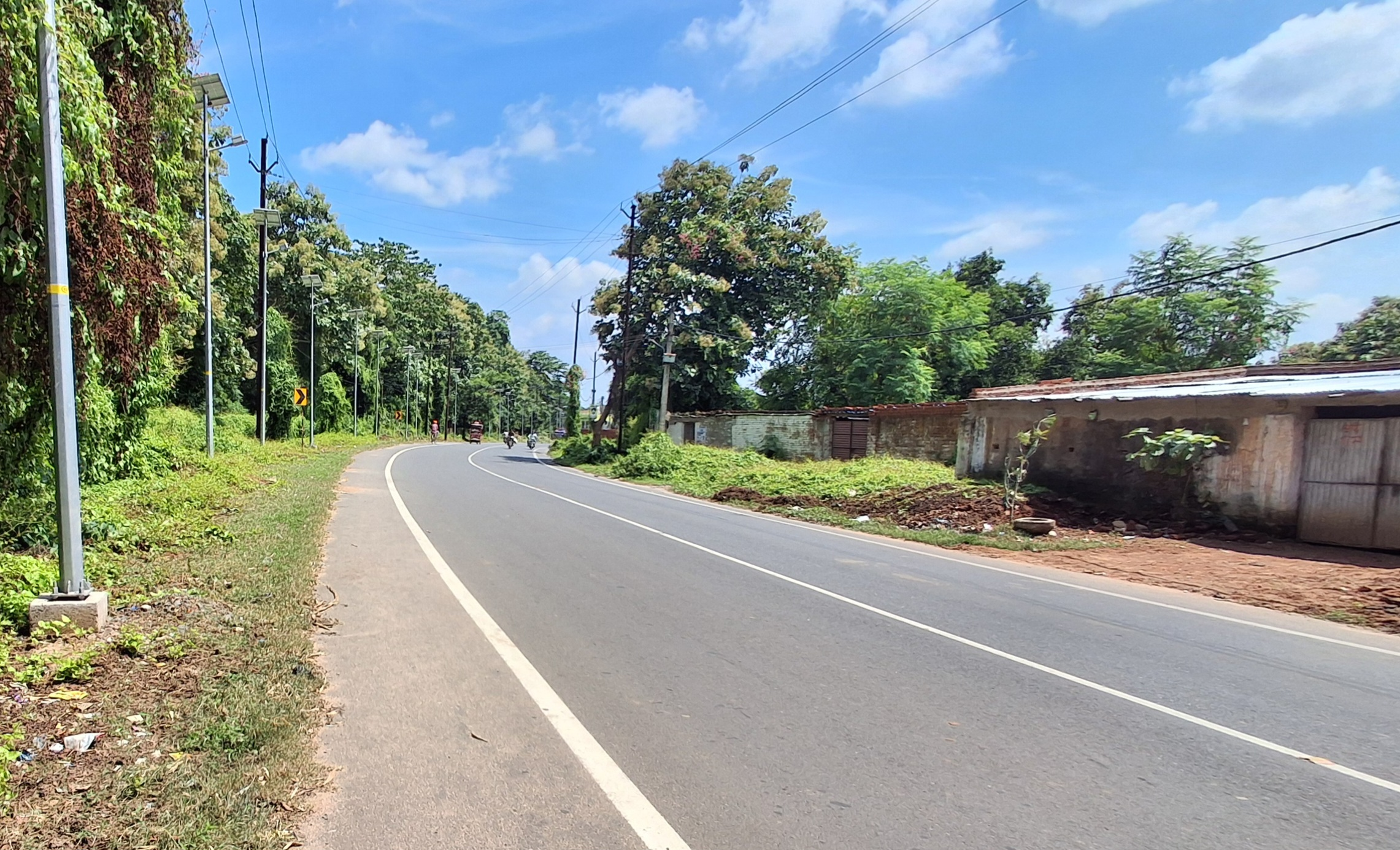
Section of National Highway 114A passing through Madhupur

Madhupur is well connected by road as it lies along National Highway 114A, which begins at Rampurhat (West Bengal), passes through Shikaripara, Dumka, Lakrapahari, Jama, Jarmundi, Choupa More, Deoghar, Sarath, Madhupur, Giridih and terminates at Dumri on NH 19 in Jharkhand.

=== Railway ===
Madhupur Junction (Station code: MDP), is a railway station of Indian Railway that connects the town of Madhupur and its nearby areas to major Indian metropolitan cities like Delhi, Kolkata, Mumbai, Bengaluru and Patna via the Howrah–New Delhi main line (Asansol–Patna section). It also links Giridih and Koderma through the 137 km single broad-gauge Madhupur–Giridih–Koderma line. With four platforms, PRS counter, WiFi, Retiring rooms and basic amenities, it handles numerous passenger trains daily like Madhupur–Anand Vihar Terminal Humsafar Express, Baba Baidyanath Dham Deoghar Humsafar Express and many more. Once this used to be a coal storage hub for steam engines, it's now the second busiest station of Asansol Railway division of Eastern railway.
