= Palojori, Deoghar =

Palojori
- Village
- Location in Jharkhand, India Palojori (India)
- Coordinates: 24.244333°N 87.024556°E
- Country: India
- State: Jharkhand
- District: Deoghar

Population (2011)
  - Total: 2,727

Languages .*For language details see Palojori#Language and religion
  - Official: Hindi, Urdu
- Time zone: UTC+5:30 (IST)
- PIN: 814146
- Telephone/ STD code: 06431
- Lok Sabha constituency: Dumka
- Vidhan Sabha constituency: Sarath
- Website: deoghar.nic.in

Palojori is a village in Palojori CD block in the Madhupur subdivision of the Deoghar district in the Indian state of Jharkhand.

== Geography ==
Cities, towns and locations in the Deoghar, Dumka and Jamtara districts in Santhal Pargana Division
M: Municipality, CT: census town, R: Rural/ Urban centre, D: Dam,
Owing to space constraints in the small map, the actual locations in a larger map may vary slightly

=== Location ===
Palojori is located at 24.244333°N 87.024556°E.

=== Overview ===
The map shows a large area, which is a plateau with low hills, except in the eastern portion where the Rajmahal hills intrude into this area and the Ramgarh hills are there. The south-western portion is just a rolling upland. The entire area is overwhelmingly rural with only small pockets of urbanisation.

Note: The full screen map is interesting. All places marked on the map are linked in the full screen map and one can easily move on to another page of his/her choice. Enlarge the full screen map to see what else is there – one gets railway connections, many more road connections and so on.

=== Area ===
Palojori has an area of 241 hectares (600 acres).

== Demographics ==
According to the 2011 Census of India, Palojori had a total population of 2,727, of which 1,396 (51%) were males and 1,331 (49%) were females. Population in the age range 0–6 years was 402. The total number of literate persons in Palojori was 2,325 (74.24% of the population over 6 years).

== Civic administration ==
=== Police station ===
There is a police station at Palojori.

=== CD block HQ ===
Headquarters of Palojori CD block is at Palojori village.

== Education ==
Kasturba Gandhi Balika Vidyalaya, Palajori, is a Hindi-medium girls only institution established in 2005. It has facilities for teaching from class VI to class XII.

Project Girls High School Palajori is a Hindi-medium coeducational institution established in 1984. It has facilities for teaching for teaching in class IX and class X.

Sunrays High School is a Hindi-medium coeducational institution established at Palajori in 2006. It has facilities for teaching from class VI to class X.
