= Deoghar (community development block) =

- Community development block
- Coordinates: 24°29′11″N 86°42′4″E
- Country: India
- State: Jharkhand
- District: Deoghar

Government
  - Type: Federal democracy

Area
  - Total: 288.50 km^{2} (111.39 sq mi)
- Elevation: 268 m (879 ft)

Population (2011)
  - Total: 142,966
  - Density: 495.55/km^{2} (1,283.5/sq mi)

Languages
  - Official: Hindi, Urdu

Literacy (2011)
  - Total literates: 73,640 (63.24%)
- Time zone: UTC+5:30 (IST)
- PIN: 814112 (B.Deoghar); 814113 (Deoghar College); 814114 (Deosang BT)814115 (Hindipith)
- Vehicle registration: JH 15
- Lok Sabha constituency: Godda
- Vidhan Sabha constituency: Deoghar
- Website: deoghar.nic.in

Deoghar is a community development block that forms an administrative division in the Deoghar subdivision, of the Deoghar district, Jharkhand state, India.

== Geography ==
Deoghar, the eponymous CD block headquarters, is located at 24°29′11″N 86°42′4″E.

Deoghar district, a plateau region, is broadly divided into two sub-micro regions – the Dumka-Godda Uplands and Deoghar Uplands. The Dumka-Godda Uplands covers the north-eastern portion of the district. It has an elevation of 753 metres (2,470 ft) above mean sea level. The Deoghar Uplands covers the south-western portion of the district.

There are some isolated peaks in the district – Phuljori (2,312 ft), 18 miles from Madhupur, Degaria (1,716 ft), 3 miles from Baidyanath Junction, Patharda (1,603 ft), 8 miles from Madhupur, and Tirkut Parvat (2,470 ft), 10 miles from Deoghar on the Dumka-Deoghar Road.

Deoghar CD block is bounded by Roh and Kawakole CD blocks in Nawada district of Bihar on the north, Mohanpur and Sarwan CD blocks on the east, Devipur CD block on the south, and Govindpur CD block in Nawada district of Bihar on the west.

Deoghar CD block has an area of 288.50 km^{2}. Deoghar Town and Kunda police stations serve this block. Headquarters of this CD block is at Deoghar.

Gram panchayats in Deoghar CD block are: Andharigadar, Baswaria, Chandih, Dharwadih, Gauripur, Gidhni, Gwalbadia, Jhhiliuachandih, Kenmankathi, Khaspaika, Khoripanan, Kokribank, Mahtodih, Udaypura, Manikpur, Masanjora, Awadih, Pichharibad, Punasi, Sangramlorhiya, Satar Khorposh, Sarsa, Shankri and Tabhaghat.

== Demographics ==
=== Population ===
As per the 2011 Census of India Deoghar CD block had a total population of 142,966, all of which were rural. There were 74,598 (52%) males and 68,368 (48%) females. Population below 6 years was 26,512. Scheduled Castes numbered 26,535 (18.56%) and Scheduled Tribes numbered 10,630 (7.44%).

=== Literacy ===
As per 2011 census the total number of literates in Deoghar CD Block was 73,640 (63.24% of the population over 6 years) out of which 46,277 (63%) were males and 27,413 (37%) were females. The gender disparity (the difference between female and male literacy rates) was 26%.

See also – List of Jharkhand districts ranked by literacy rate

Literacy in CD Blocks of
Deoghar district
Deoghar – 63.24%
Mohanpur – 58.66%
Sarwan – 63.39%
Sonaraithari – 58.03%
Devipur – 59.43%
Madhupur – 59.57%
Margomunda – 58.46%
Karon – 59.61%
Sarath – 62.63%
Palojori – 60.27%
Source: 2011 Census: CD Block Wise
Primary Census Abstract Data

=== Language and religion ===
Religions in Deoghar block (2011)
Religion	Percent
Hinduism	92.27%
Islam	6.94%
Other or not stated	0.79%

Languages of Deoghar block (2011)
1. Khortha (50.4%)
2. Hindi (41.8%)
3. Santali (2.59%)
4. Bengali (1.57%)
5. 'Other' Hindi (0.97%)
6. Others (2.66%)

At the time of the 2011 census, 50.41% Khortha, 41.80% Hindi, 2.59% Santali and 1.57% Bengali as their first language. 0.97% of the population spoke 'Others' under Hindi.

== Rural poverty ==
50-60% of the population of Deoghar district were in the BPL category in 2004–2005, being in the same category as Pakur, Sahebganj and Garhwa districts. Rural poverty in Jharkhand declined from 66% in 1993–94 to 46% in 2004–05. In 2011, it has come down to 39.1%.

== Economy ==
=== Livelihood ===
Livelihood
in Deoghar CD block
1. Cultivators (30.0%)
2. Agricultural labourers (37.9%)
3. Household industries (7.52%)
4. Other Workers (24.5%)

In Deoghar CD block in 2011, amongst the class of total workers, cultivators numbered 15,634 and formed 24.54%, agricultural labourers numbered 19,774 and formed 37.94%, household industry workers numbered 3,919 and formed 7.52% and other workers numbered 12,787 and formed 24.54%. Total workers numbered 109,589 and formed 31.74% of the total population. Non-workers numbered 236,230 and formed 68.26% of total population.

Note: In the census records a person is considered a cultivator, if the person is engaged in cultivation/ supervision of land owned. When a person who works on another person's land for wages in cash or kind or share, is regarded as an agricultural labourer. Household industry is defined as an industry conducted by one or more members of the family within the household or village, and one that does not qualify for registration as a factory under the Factories Act. Other workers are persons engaged in some economic activity other than cultivators, agricultural labourers and household workers. It includes factory, mining, plantation, transport and office workers, those engaged in business and commerce, teachers and entertainment artistes.

=== Infrastructure ===
There are 266 inhabited villages in Deoghar CD block. In 2011, 237 villages had power supply. 10 villages had tap water (treated/ untreated), 258 villages had well water (covered/ uncovered), 262 villages had hand pumps, and 4 villages had no drinking water facility. 22 villages had post offices, 12 villages had sub post offices, 1 village had telephones (land lines), 2 villages had public call offices and 110 villages had mobile phone coverage. 3 villages had bank branches, 264 villages had ATMs, 6 villages had agricultural credit societies, 4 villages had public library and public reading rooms. 68 villages had public distribution system, 11 villages had weekly haat (market) and 110 villages had assembly polling stations.

=== Agriculture ===
The agricultural sector absorbs around two-thirds of the workforce in the district. In Deoghar CD block, the cultivable area formed 67.45% of the total area, and the irrigated area formed 14.41% of the cultivable area.

Jungles in the plain areas have almost been cleared and even hills are becoming naked in an area once known for its extensive forests.

=== Backward Regions Grant Fund ===
Deoghar district is listed as a backward region and receives financial support from the Backward Regions Grant Fund. The fund created by the Government of India is designed to redress regional imbalances in development. As of 2012, 272 districts across the country were listed under this scheme. The list includes 21 districts of Jharkhand.

== Education ==
Deoghar CD block had 26 villages with pre-primary schools, 160 villages with primary schools, 62 villages with middle schools, 1 village with secondary school, 4 villages with senior secondary schools, 105 villages with no educational facility.
.*Senior secondary schools are also known as Inter colleges in Jharkhand

== Healthcare ==
Deoghar CD block had 4 villages with primary health centres, 15 villages with primary health subcentres, 2 villages with maternity and child welfare centres, 1 village with TB clinic, 3 villages with dispensaries, 1 village with veterinary hospital, 1 village with family welfare centre, 5 villages with medicine shops.
.*Private medical practitioners, alternative medicine etc. not included
