= Karneshwar Dham =

Karneshwar Dham, Karon
- कर्णेश्वर धाम
- Location in Jharkhand

Religion
- Affiliation: Hinduism
- District: Deoghar
- Deity: Karna and Shiva
- Festivals: Maha Shivaratri, Durga Puja

Location
- State: Jharkhand
- Country: India
- Coordinates: 24°7′38″N 86°44′41″E

Architecture
- Creator: Karna
- Temple: 28

Karneshwar Dham, also known as Karneshwar Shiv Mandir (Karna+ eshwar; the god of Karna-lord Shiva who was also Rameshwar) is one of the ancient temples in Karon, the most sacred abodes of Shiva named after Karna, a key antagonist of the Hindu epic Mahabharata. Karneshwar is located in Karon in the Deoghar district of the state of Jharkhand, India. It is a temple complex consisting of the main temple of Baba Karneshwar, where the Shivalinga is installed, and 27 other temples.

According to Hindu beliefs, Karna who was the then ruler of Karon which comes under Angadesh, was a devotee of Shiva and thus he installed a Shivalinga at the current site of the temple to worship Shiva, his lord. As it is believed that the temple is built by King Karna, so from this aspect the temple derives its name.
