= Sarwan, Deoghar (village) =

Sarwan
- Village
- Location in Jharkhand, India Sarwan (India)
- Coordinates: 24.378611°N 86.773056°E
- Country: India
- State: Jharkhand
- District: Deoghar

Population (2011)
  - Total: 3,515

Languages (*For language details see Sarwan, Deoghar#Language and religion)
  - Official: Hindi, Urdu
- Time zone: UTC+5:30 (IST)
- PIN: 814150 (Sarwan)
- Telephone/ STD code: 06432
- Lok Sabha constituency: Godda
- Vidhan Sabha constituency: Jarmundi
- Website: deoghar.nic.in

Sarwan is a village in Sarwan CD block in the Deoghar subdivision of the Deoghar district in the Indian state of Jharkhand.

== Geography ==
Cities, towns and locations in the Deoghar, Dumka and Jamtara districts in Santhal Pargana Division
M: Municipality, CT: census town, R: Rural/ Urban centre, D: Dam,
Owing to space constraints in the small map, the actual locations in a larger map may vary slightly

=== Location ===
Sarwan is located at 24.378611°N 86.773056°E.

=== Overview ===
The map shows a large area, which is a plateau with low hills, except in the eastern portion where the Rajmahal hills intrude into this area and the Ramgarh hills are there. The south-western portion is just a rolling upland. The entire area is overwhelmingly rural with only small pockets of urbanisation.

Note: The full screen map is interesting. All places marked on the map are linked in the full screen map and one can easily move on to another page of his/her choice. Enlarge the full screen map to see what else is there – one gets railway connections, many more road connections and so on.

=== Area ===
Sarwan has an area of 236 hectares (580 acres).

In the map of Sarwan CD block in the District Census Handbook, Deoghar, Sarwan is shown as being part of Sarwa mouza (MDDS PLCN - 830).

== Demographics ==
According to the 2011 Census of India, Sarwa had a total population of 3,515, of which 1,711 (49%) were males and 1,804 (50%) were females. Population in the age range 0–6 years was 546. The total number of literate persons in Sarwa was 2,969 (71.71% of the population over 6 years).

== Civic administration ==
=== Police station ===
There is a police station at Sarwan.

=== CD block HQ ===
Headquarters of Sarwan CD block is at Sarwan village.

== Education ==
Sarwan is known for contributing towards education in Deoghar district. Two schools which are famous for contributions towards providing notable alumni (Pradeep Kumar Lal, Senior Executive Panjab National Bank and Shankar Burnwal, IIT) are Middle School Sarwan and High School Sarwan. The middle school came into the limelight under Headmaster Late Narsingh Pandit ji. His strict discipline and efforts to make sure all teachers attended classes without fail led to nurturing many students and making them successful in their careers. Some of the notable teachers from the middle school are Bijay Kumar Sah (mathematics), Madan Pandit (mathematics, Sanskrit), Tej Narayn Rajhans (social science, Hindi and mathematics), Teklal Mahto (science), Rita Didi (various subjects), and Maheshwar Sir (English) Pradeep Kumar Jha (Science).

Kasturba Gandhi Balika Vidyalaya, Sarwan, is a Hindi-medium girls only institution established in 2005. It has facilities for teaching from class VI to class XII.

Sarwan High School is a Hindi-medium coeducational institution established in 1948. It has facilities for teaching for teaching from class IX to class XII.
