= Parbad =

- Village
- Country: India
- State: Jharkhand
- District: Deoghar
- Block: Sarath

Area
  - Total: 126 ha (310 acres)

Population (2011)
  - Total: 771
  - Density: 612/km^{2} (1,580/sq mi)
- Time zone: UTC+5:30 (IST)
- PIN: 814149
- Vehicle registration: JH

Parbad is a village located in the Sarath block of the Deoghar district in the Indian state of Jharkhand. It is known for its historical temple, Parbad Kali Mandir and has a recorded population of 771 as per the 2011 Census.

== Geography ==
Parbad is situated approximately 7 km from the block headquarters Sarath and about 44 km from the district town of Deoghar. The total area of the village is around 126 hectares.

== Demographics ==
Per the 2011 census of India, Parbad had a population of 771 individuals: 407 male and 364 female. Children aged 0–6 years constituted 127 individuals or about 16.5% of the total population.

The village has a higher literacy rate than the state average, with an overall literacy of 84.56% — 95.97% for males and 71.38% for females.

The child sex ratio is 1,117 females per 1,000 males, which is significantly higher than the Jharkhand state average.

== Education ==
The village has a government-run primary school, Govt. P.S. Parbad, which was established in 1960. The school provides education up to class 5.

== Economy ==
Out of the total population, around 204 individuals were engaged in work activities, which includes both main (18.6%) and marginal (81.4%) work. A small portion work as cultivators and agricultural laborers.

== Transport ==
The nearest public bus and railway services are located more than 10 km away from the village.

== Culture and religion ==
=== Parbad Kali Mandir ===
The Parbad Kali Mandir is a significant religious and cultural center in the village. It is believed to have been founded in the 18th century by the ancestors of kapil chandra Ray ,Thakur Ram Kishor Ray, the then Zamindar and Thakur of Parbad. He is credited with financing and building the temple out of devotion to the Goddess Kali.

The temple follows traditional regional architectural style and serves both tantric and mainstream Hindu worship. Its sanctum sanctorum (garbhagriha) is dedicated to Goddess Kali. Rituals performed include yagna, havan, Chandi path, and animal sacrifice.

A major renovation took place in 2024–25, with an investment of nearly ₹1 crore, reviving its original heritage style.

The pratishtha mahotsav (reconsecration ceremony) was held on 28 June 2023, led by Acharya Alok and local priests and covered by regional news media.
