= Mohanpur, Deoghar =

Mohanpur
- Community development block
- Coordinates: 24°29′41″N 86°46′49″E
- Country: India
- State: Jharkhand
- District: Deoghar

Government
  - Type: Federal democracy

Area
  - Total: 362.15 km^{2} (139.83 sq mi)
- Elevation: 268 m (879 ft)

Population (2011)
  - Total: 175,845
  - Density: 485.56/km^{2} (1,257.6/sq mi)

Languages
  - Official: Hindi, Urdu

Literacy (2011)
  - Total literates: 83,926 (58.66%)
- Time zone: UTC+5:30 (IST)
- PIN: 814157 (Mohanpur)
- Telephone/STD code: 06432
- Vehicle registration: JH 15
- Lok Sabha constituency: Godda
- Vidhan Sabha constituency: Deoghar
- Website: deoghar.nic.in

Mohanpur is a community development block that forms an administrative division in the Deoghar subdivision of the Deoghar district, Jharkhand state, India.

== Geography ==
Mohanpur, the eponymous CD block headquarters, is located at 24°29′41″N 86°46′49″E.

It is located 14 km from Deoghar, the district headquarters.

Deoghar district, a plateau region, is broadly divided into two sub-micro regions – the Dumka-Godda Uplands and Deoghar Uplands. The Dumka-Godda Uplands covers the north-eastern portion of the district. It has an elevation of 753 metres (2,470 ft) above mean sea level. The Deoghar Uplands covers the south-western portion of the district.

There are some isolated peaks in the district, including Phuljori (2,312 ft), 18 miles from Madhupur, Degaria (1,716 ft), 3 miles from Baidyanath Junction, Patharda (1,603 ft), 8 miles from Madhupur, and Tirkut Parvat (2,470 ft), 10 miles from Deoghar on the Dumka-Deoghar Road.

Mohanpur CD block is bounded by Kawakole CD block in Nawada district and Chakai CD block in Jamui district both in Bihar on the north, Saraiyahat and Jarmundi CD blocks in Dumka district on the east, Sonaraithari and Sarwan CD blocks on the south, and Deoghar CD block on the west.

Mohanpur CD block has an area of 362.15 km^{2}.Mohanpur police station serves this block. Headquarters of this CD block is at Mohanpur village.

Gram panchayats in Mohanpur CD block are: Baghmari Kitakhawra, Balthar, Bank, Banka, Bara, Bhikna, Bichgarha, Chakarama, Dahijore, Ghongha, Ghutabara Ashana, Harkatta, Jamunia, Jhalar, Jharkhandi, Katwan, Kajuria (Sarasani), Malhara, Medinidih, Morne, Nayachitkath, Postwari, Raghunathpur, Radhia, Suardehi, Tarabad, Thadiyara, and Tumbabel.

== Demographics ==
=== Population ===
As per the 2011 Census of India Mohanpur CD block had a total population of 175,845, all of which were rural. There were 91,477 (52%) males and 84,368 (48%) females. Population below 6 years was 32,766. Scheduled Castes numbered 23,976 (13.63%) and Scheduled Tribes numbered 18,039 (10.26%).

=== Literacy ===
As of the 2011 census, the total number of literates in Mohanpur CD Block was 83,926 (58.66% of the population over 6 years) out of which 53,175 (63%) were males and 30,751 (37%) were females. The gender disparity (the difference between female and male literacy rates) was 26%.

See also – List of Jharkhand districts ranked by literacy rate

Literacy in CD Blocks of
Deoghar district
Deoghar – 63.24%
Mohanpur – 58.66%
Sarwan – 63.39%
Sonaraithari – 58.03%
Devipur – 59.43%
Madhupur – 59.57%
Margomunda – 58.46%
Karon – 59.61%
Sarath – 62.63%
Palojori – 60.27%
Source: 2011 Census: CD Block Wise
Primary Census Abstract Data

=== Language and religion ===
Religions in Mohanpur block (2011)
| Religion | Percent |
| Hinduism | 87.82% |
| Islam | 11.53% |
| Christianity | 0.40% |
| Other or not stated | 0.25% |

Languages of Mohanpur block (2011)
1. Khortha (83.0%)
2. Santali (6.85%)
3. Hindi (5.87%)
4. 'Other' Hindi (2.46%)
5. Others (1.87%)

At the time of the 2011 census, 82.95% of the population spoke Khortha, 6.85% Santali and 5.87% Hindi as their first language. 2.46% of the population spoke 'Others' under Hindi.

== Rural poverty ==
50-60% of the population of Deoghar district were in the BPL category in 2004–2005, being in the same category as Pakur, Sahebganj and Garhwa districts. Rural poverty in Jharkhand declined from 66% in 1993–94 to 46% in 2004–05. In 2011, it has come down to 39.1%.

== Economy ==
=== Livelihood ===
Livelihood
in Mohanpur CD block
1. Cultivators (27.6%)
2. Agricultural labourers (39.0%)
3. Household industries (7.90%)
4. Other Workers (25.5%)

In Mohanpur CD block in 2011, amongst the class of total workers, cultivators numbered 19,525 and formed 27.55%, agricultural labourers numbered 27,657 and formed 39.03%, household industry workers numbered 5,598 and formed 7.90% and other workers numbered 18,086 and formed 25.52%. Total workers numbered 70,866 and formed 40.30% of the total population. Non-workers numbered 104,979 and formed 59.70% of total population.

Note: In the census records a person is considered a cultivator, if the person is engaged in cultivation/ supervision of land owned. When a person who works on another person's land for wages in cash or kind or share, is regarded as an agricultural labourer. Household industry is defined as an industry conducted by one or more members of the family within the household or village, and one that does not qualify for registration as a factory under the Factories Act. Other workers are persons engaged in some economic activity other than cultivators, agricultural labourers and household workers. It includes factory, mining, plantation, transport and office workers, those engaged in business and commerce, teachers and entertainment artistes.

=== Infrastructure ===
There are 383 inhabited villages in Mohanpur CD block. In 2011, 304 villages had power supply. 3 villages had tap water (treated/ untreated), 372 villages had well water (covered/ uncovered), 369 villages had hand pumps, and 7 villages had no drinking water facility. 31 villages had post offices, 10 villages had sub post offices, 14 villages had telephones (land lines), 219 villages had public call offices and 110 villages had mobile phone coverage. 9 villages had bank branches, 382 villages had ATMs, 7 villages had agricultural credit societies, 1 village had cinema/ video halls. 106 villages had public distribution system, 22 villages had weekly haat (market) and 122 villages had assembly polling stations.

=== Agriculture ===
The agricultural sector absorbs around two-thirds of the workforce in the district. In Mohanpur CD block, the cultivable area formed 45.09% of the total area, and the irrigated area formed 25.61% of the cultivable area.

Jungles in the plain areas have almost been cleared and even hills are becoming naked in an area once known for its extensive forests.

=== Backward Regions Grant Fund ===
Deoghar district is listed as a backward region and receives financial support from the Backward Regions Grant Fund. The fund created by the Government of India is designed to redress regional imbalances in development. As of 2012, 272 districts across the country were listed under this scheme. The list includes 21 districts of Jharkhand.

== Transport ==
The Jasidih–Dumka–Rampurhat railway line is fully operational from June 2015. The Jasidih-Dumka sector was operational from 2011. There is a railway station at Mohanpur named Mohanpur railway station.

== Education ==
Mohanpur CD block had 42 villages with pre-primary schools, 244 villages with primary schools, 89 villages with middle schools, 1 village with senior secondary school, 4 non-formal training centres, 3 special schools for the disabled, 130 villages with no educational facility.
.*Senior secondary schools are also known as Inter colleges in Jharkhand

== Healthcare ==
Mohanpur CD block had 3 villages with primary health centres, 12 villages with primary health subcentres, 23 villages with maternity and child welfare centres, 2 villages with dispensaries, 1 village with family welfare centre, 58 villages with medicine shops.
.*Private medical practitioners, alternative medicine etc. not included
