= Madhupur (community development block) =

- Community development block
- Santali
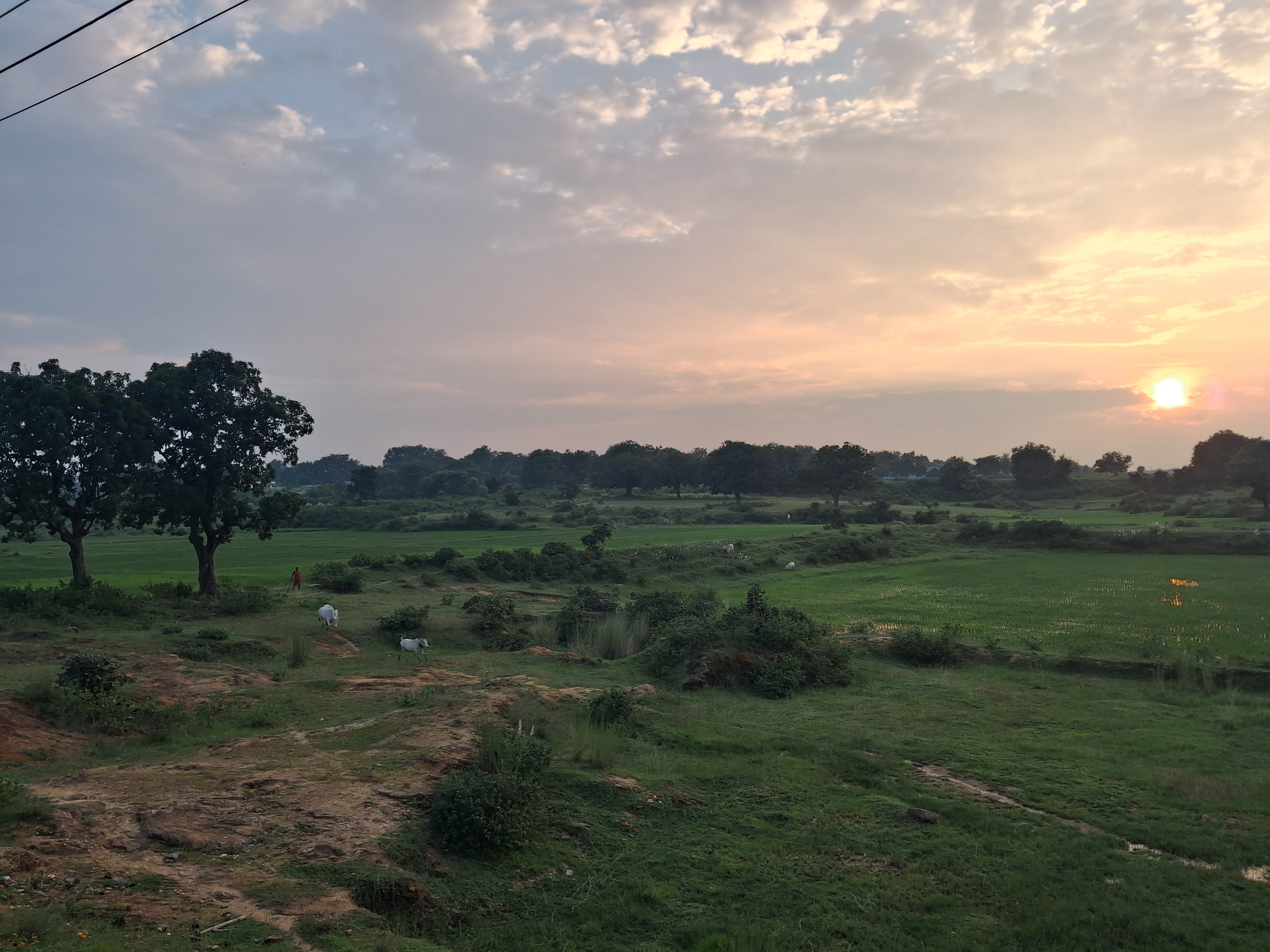
- Garia, a village in Madhupur community development block

- Coordinates: 24°17′36″N 86°38′25″E
- Country: India
- State: Jharkhand
- District: Deoghar

Government
  - Type: Federal democracy

Area
  - Total: 253.59 km^{2} (97.91 sq mi)
- Elevation: 254 m (833 ft)

Population (2011)
  - Total: 135,510
  - Density: 534.37/km^{2} (1,384.0/sq mi)

Languages
  - Official: Hindi, Urdu

Literacy (2011)
  - Total literates: 64,881 (59.57%)
- Time zone: UTC+5:30 (IST)
- PIN: 815353 (Madhupur)
- Telephone/STD code: 06438
- Vehicle registration: JH 15
- Lok Sabha constituency: Godda
- Vidhan Sabha constituency: Madhupur
- Website: deoghar.nic.in

Madhupur is a community development block that forms an administrative division in the Madhupur subdivision of the Deoghar district, Jharkhand state, India.

== Geography ==
Madhupur, the eponymous CD block headquarters, is located at 24°17′36″N 86°38′25″E.

It is located 29 km from Deoghar, the district headquarters.

Deoghar district, a plateau region, is broadly divided into two sub-micro regions – the Dumka-Godda Uplands and Deoghar Uplands. The Dumka-Godda Uplands covers the north-eastern portion of the district. It has an elevation of 753 metres (2,470 ft) above mean sea level. The Deoghar Uplands covers the south-western portion of the district.

There are some isolated peaks in the district, including Phuljori (2,312 ft), 18 miles from Madhupur, Degaria (1,716 ft), 3 miles from Baidyanath Junction, Patharda (1,603 ft), 8 miles from Madhupur, as well as Tirkut Parvat (2,470 ft), 10 miles from Deoghar on the Dumka-Deoghar Road.

Madhupur CD block is bounded by Devipur CD block on the north, Sarath CD block on the east, Karan and Margomunda CD blocks on the south, and Bengabad CD block on the west.

Madhupur CD block has an area of 253.59 km^{2}. Madhupur police station serves this block. Headquarters of this CD block is at Madhupur.

Gram panchayats in Madhupur CD block are: Baranarayanpur, Berwa, Burhai, Charpa, Dalha, Darwe, Dhamani, Gariya, Ghagharjori, Gonaiya, Govindpur, Jamani, Jawagudi, Misarna, Pasiya, Pathljor, Patwabad, Saptar, Siktya, Suggapahari and Udaypura.

== Demographics ==
=== Population ===
As per the 2011 Census of India Madhupur CD block had a total population of 135,510, all of which were rural. There were 69,827 (52%) males and 65,683 (48%) females. Population below 6 years was 26,591. Scheduled Castes numbered 20,671 (15.25%) and Scheduled Tribes numbered 20,272 (14.96%).

=== Literacy ===
As per 2011 census the total number of literates in Madhupur CD block was 64,881 (59.57% of the population over 6 years) out of which 41,095 (63%) were males and 23,786 (37%) were females. The gender disparity (the difference between female and male literacy rates) was 26%.

See also – List of Jharkhand districts ranked by literacy rate

Literacy in CD Blocks of
Deoghar district
Deoghar – 63.24%
Mohanpur – 58.66%
Sarwan – 63.39%
Sonaraithari – 58.03%
Devipur – 59.43%
Madhupur – 59.57%
Margomunda – 58.46%
Karon – 59.61%
Sarath – 62.63%
Palojori – 60.27%
Source: 2011 Census: CD Block Wise
Primary Census Abstract Data

=== Language and religion ===
Religions in Madhupur block (2011)
Religion	Percent
Hinduism	60.40%
Islam	38.07%
Christianity	0.96%
Sarna	0.46%
Other or not stated	0.11%

Languages of Madhupur block (2011)
1. Khortha (52.2%)
2. Urdu (25.6%)
3. Hindi (9.45%)
4. Santali (9.00%)
5. Bengali (1.29%)
6. Others (2.48%)

At the time of the 2011 census, 52.20% of the population spoke Khortha, 25.58% Urdu, 9.45% Hindi, 9.00% Santali and 1.29% Bengali as their first language.

== Rural poverty ==
50-60% of the population of Deoghar district were in the BPL category in 2004–2005, being in the same category as Pakur, Sahebganj and Garhwa districts. Rural poverty in Jharkhand declined from 66% in 1993–94 to 46% in 2004–05. In 2011, it has come down to 39.1%.

== Economy ==
=== Livelihood ===
Livelihood
in Madhupur CD block
1. Cultivators (14.8%)
2. Agricultural labourers (26.9%)
3. Household industries (13.1%)
4. Other Workers (45.2%)

In Madhupur CD block in 2011, amongst the class of total workers, cultivators numbered 6,609 and formed 14.76%, agricultural labourers numbered 12,041 and formed 26.89%, household industry workers numbered 5,870 and formed 13.11% and other workers numbered 20,253 and formed 45.23%. Total workers numbered 60,273 and formed 31.65% of the total population. Non-workers numbered 130,375 and formed 68.35% of total population.

Note: In the census records a person is considered a cultivator, if the person is engaged in cultivation/ supervision of land owned. When a person who works on another person's land for wages in cash or kind or share, is regarded as an agricultural labourer. Household industry is defined as an industry conducted by one or more members of the family within the household or village, and one that does not qualify for registration as a factory under the Factories Act. Other workers are persons engaged in some economic activity other than cultivators, agricultural labourers and household workers. It includes factory, mining, plantation, transport and office workers, those engaged in business and commerce, teachers and entertainment artistes.

=== Infrastructure ===
There are 206 inhabited villages in Madhupur CD block. In 2011, 159 villages had power supply. 22 villages had tap water (treated/ untreated), 194 villages had well water (covered/ uncovered), 189 villages had hand pumps, and 10 villages had no drinking water facility. 24 villages had post offices, 6 villages had sub post offices, 25 villages had telephones (land lines), 27 villages had public call offices and 80 villages had mobile phone coverage. 7 villages had bank branches, 146 villages had ATMs, 2 villages had agricultural credit societies, 3 villages had cinema/ video halls, 4 villages had public library and public reading rooms. 61 villages had public distribution system, 11 villages had weekly haat (market) and 99 villages had assembly polling stations.

=== Agriculture ===
The agricultural sector absorbs around two-thirds of the workforce in the district. In Madhupur CD block, the cultivable area formed 41.41% of the total area, and the irrigated area formed 20.01% of the cultivable area.

Jungles in the plain areas have almost been cleared and even hills are becoming naked in an area once known for its extensive forests.

=== Backward Regions Grant Fund ===
Deoghar district is listed as a backward region and receives financial support from the Backward Regions Grant Fund. The fund created by the Government of India is designed to redress regional imbalances in development. As of 2012, 272 districts across the country were listed under this scheme. The list includes 21 districts of Jharkhand.

== Transport ==
The Ranigunj-Kiul section of the Howrah-Delhi main line was in position in 1871. It provided rail link for Madhupur.

== Education ==
Madhupur CD block had 33 villages with pre-primary schools, 146 villages with primary schools, 49 villages with middle schools, 12 villages with secondary schools, 6 villages with senior secondary schools, 2 non-formal training centre, 59 villages with no educational facility.
.*Senior secondary schools are also known as Inter colleges in Jharkhand

== Healthcare ==
Madhupur CD block had 10 villages with primary health centres, 24 villages with primary health subcentres, 8 villages with maternity and child welfare centres, 11 villages with allopathic hospitals, 8 village with dispensary, 3 villages with family welfare centres, 50 villages with medicine shops.
.*Private medical practitioners, alternative medicine etc. not included
