= Margomunda =

- Community development block
- Coordinates: 24.165163°N 86.587578°E
- Country: India
- State: Jharkhand
- District: Deoghar

Government
  - Type: Federal democracy

Area
  - Total: 155.09 km^{2} (59.88 sq mi)
- Elevation: 298 m (978 ft)

Population (2011)
  - Total: 86,733
  - Density: 559.24/km^{2} (1,448.4/sq mi)

Languages
  - Official: Hindi, Urdu

Literacy (2011)
  - Total literates: 39,674 (58.46%)
- Time zone: UTC+5:30 (IST)
- PIN: 815353 (Margomunda)
- Telephone/STD code: 06438
- Vehicle registration: JH-15
- Lok Sabha constituency: Godda
- Vidhan Sabha constituency: Madhupur
- Website: deoghar.nic.in

Margomunda (also spelled as Margo Munda) is a community development block that forms an administrative division in the Madhupur subdivision of the Deoghar district, Jharkhand state, India.

== History ==
Margomunda was created a new block in 2009.

== Geography ==
Margomunda, the eponymous CD block headquarters, is located at 24.165163°N 86.587578°E.

It is located 45 km from Deoghar, the district headquarters.

Deoghar district, a plateau region, is broadly divided into two sub-micro regions – the Dumka-Godda Uplands and Deoghar Uplands. The Dumka-Godda Uplands covers the north-eastern portion of the district. It has an elevation of 753 metres (2,470 ft) above mean sea level. The Deoghar Uplands covers the south-western portion of the district.

There are some isolated peaks in the district, including Phuljori (2,312 ft), 18 miles from Madhupur, Degaria (1,716 ft), 3 miles from Baidyanath Junction, Patharda (1,603 ft), 8 miles from Madhupur, and Tirkut Parvat (2,470 ft), 10 miles from Deoghar on the Dumka-Deoghar Road.

Margomunda CD block is bounded by Madhupur CD block on the north, Karon CD block on the east, Narayanpur CD block in Jamtara district on a portion of the south, Gandey CD block in Giridih district on a portion of the south and the west.

Margomunda CD block has an area of 155.09 km^{2}. Margomunda police station serves this block. Headquarters of this CD block is at Margomunda village.

Gram panchayats in Margomunda CD block are: Baghmara, Bansimi, Chetnari, Kano, Laharjori, Mahjori, Mahuatand, Margomunda, Murlipahari, Pandniya, Pipra, Rampur and Suggapahari.

== Demographics ==
=== Population ===
As per the 2011 Census of India Margomunda CD block had a total population of 86,733, all of which were rural. There were 44,284 (51%) males and 42,449 (49%) females. Population below 6 years was 18,862. Scheduled Castes numbered 3,221 (3.71%) and Scheduled Tribes numbered 18,813 (21.69%).

=== Literacy ===
As of 2011 census, the total number of literates in Margo Munda CD block was 39,674 (58.46% of the population over 6 years) out of which 24,920 (63%) were males and 14,754 (37%) were females. The gender disparity (the difference between female and male literacy rates) was 26%.

See also – List of Jharkhand districts ranked by literacy rate

Literacy in CD Blocks of
Deoghar district
Deoghar – 63.24%
Mohanpur – 58.66%
Sarwan – 63.39%
Sonaraithari – 58.03%
Devipur – 59.43%
Madhupur – 59.57%
Margomunda – 58.46%
Karon – 59.61%
Sarath – 62.63%
Palojori – 60.27%
Source: 2011 Census: CD Block Wise
Primary Census Abstract Data

=== Language and religion ===
Religions in Margomunda block (2011)
Religion	Percent
Islam	48.35%
Hinduism	47.16%
Sarna	3.88%
Christianity	0.52%
Other or not stated	0.09%

Languages of Margomunda block (2011)
1. Khortha (50.2%)
2. Urdu (24.1%)
3. Santali (19.5%)
4. Hindi (4.98%)
5. Bengali (0.97%)
6. Others (0.24%)

At the time of the 2011 census, 50.17% of the population spoke Khortha, 24.12% Urdu, 19.52% Santali, 4.98% Hindi and 0.97% Bengali as their first language.

== Rural poverty ==
50-60% of the population of Deoghar district were in the BPL category in 2004–2005, being in the same category as Pakur, Sahebganj and Garhwa districts. Rural poverty in Jharkhand declined from 66% in 1993–94 to 46% in 2004–05. In 2011, it has come down to 39.1%.

== Economy ==
=== Livelihood ===
Livelihood
in Margomunda CD block
1. Cultivators (26.5%)
2. Agricultural labourers (50.6%)
3. Household industries (3.89%)
4. Other Workers (19.0%)

In Margomunda CD block in 2011, amongst the class of total workers, cultivators numbered 9,218 and formed 26.52%, agricultural labourers numbered 17,588 and formed 50.60%, household industry workers numbered 1,353 and formed 3.89% and other workers numbered 6,600 and formed 18.99%. Total workers numbered 34,759 and formed 40.08% of the total population. Non-workers numbered 51,974 and formed 59.92% of total population.

Note: In the census records a person is considered a cultivator, if the person is engaged in cultivation/ supervision of land owned. When a person who works on another person's land for wages in cash or kind or share, is regarded as an agricultural labourer. Household industry is defined as an industry conducted by one or more members of the family within the household or village, and one that does not qualify for registration as a factory under the Factories Act. Other workers are persons engaged in some economic activity other than cultivators, agricultural labourers and household workers. It includes factory, mining, plantation, transport and office workers, those engaged in business and commerce, teachers and entertainment artistes.

=== Infrastructure ===
There are 119 inhabited villages in Margomunda CD block. In 2011, 113 villages had power supply. 10 villages had tap water (treated/ untreated), 115 villages had well water (covered/ uncovered), 115 villages had hand pumps, and 4 villages had no drinking water facility. 4 villages had post offices, 3 villages had sub post offices, 1 village had telephones (land lines), 12 villages had public call offices and 55 villages had mobile phone coverage. 5 villages had bank branches, 119 villages had ATMs, 6 villages had agricultural credit societies, 1 village had cinema/ video hall, 1 village had public library and public reading room. 26 villages had public distribution system, 6 villages had weekly haat (market) and 53 villages had assembly polling stations.

=== Agriculture ===
The agricultural sector absorbs around two-thirds of the workforce in the district. In Margomunda CD block, the cultivable area formed 46.80% of the total area, and the irrigated area formed 21.60% of the cultivable area.

Jungles in the plain areas have almost been cleared and even hills are becoming naked in an area once known for its extensive forests.

=== Backward Regions Grant Fund ===
Deoghar district is listed as a backward region and receives financial support from the Backward Regions Grant Fund. The fund created by the Government of India is designed to redress regional imbalances in development. As of 2012, 272 districts across the country were listed under this scheme. The list includes 21 districts of Jharkhand.

== Education ==
Margomunda CD block had 8 villages with pre-primary schools, 100 villages with primary schools, 33 villages with middle schools, 2 villages with secondary schools, 19 villages with no educational facility.

== Healthcare ==
Margomunda CD block had 2 villages with primary health centres, 8 villages with primary health subcentres, 1 village with maternity and child welfare centre, 1 village with veterinary hospital, 1 village with family welfare centre, 6 villages with medicine shops.
.*Private medical practitioners, alternative medicine etc. not included
