= Karon, Deoghar (village) =

Karon
- Village
- Location in Jharkhand, India Karon (India)
- Coordinates: 24.127222°N 86.744722°E
- Country: India
- State: Jharkhand
- District: Deoghar

Population (2011)
  - Total: 5,110

Languages .*For language details see Karon, Deoghar#Language and religion
  - Official: Hindi, Urdu
- Time zone: UTC+5:30 (IST)
- PIN: 815357 (Karongram)
- Telephone/ STD code: 06432
- Lok Sabha constituency: Godda
- Vidhan Sabha constituency: Madhupur
- Website: deoghar.nic.in

Karon is a village in Karon CD block in the Deoghar subdivision of the Deoghar district in the Indian state of Jharkhand.

== Ancient names ==
- Shri Ganj
- KaranGram (during the reign of Karna of Mahabharata)
- Karon Gram (present official name)

== Geography ==
Cities, towns and locations in the Deoghar, Dumka and Jamtara districts in Santhal Pargana Division
M: Municipality, CT: census town, R: Rural/ Urban centre, D: Dam,
Owing to space constraints in the small map, the actual locations in a larger map may vary slightly

=== Location ===
Karo is located at 24.127222°N 86.744722°E.

In the map of Karon CD block in the District Census Handbook, Deoghar, Karon is shown as being part of Karo mouza (MDDS PLCN - 920).

=== Overview ===
The map shows a large area, which is a plateau with low hills, except in the eastern portion where the Rajmahal hills intrude into this area and the Ramgarh hills are there. The south-western portion is just a rolling upland. The entire area is overwhelmingly rural with only small pockets of urbanisation.

Note: The full screen map is interesting. All places marked on the map are linked in the full screen map and one can easily move on to another page of his/her choice. Enlarge the full screen map to see what else is there – one gets railway connections, many more road connections and so on.

=== Area ===
Karo has an area of 888 hectares (2,190 acres).

== Demographics ==
According to the 2011 Census of India, Karo had a total population of 5,110, of which 2,535 (50%) were males and 2,575 (50%) were females. Population in the age range 0–6 years was 643. The total number of literate persons in Karon was 4,467 (75.73% of the population over 6 years).

== Civic administration ==
=== Police station ===
There is a police station at Karon.

=== CD block HQ ===
Headquarters of Karon CD block is at Karon village.

== Education ==
Kasturba Gandhi Balika Vidyalaya, Karon, is a Hindi-medium girls only institution established in 2005. It has facilities for teaching from class VI to class XII.

Rani Mandakini High School Karogram is a Hindi-medium coeducational institution established in 1946. It has facilities for teaching from class IX to class XII.

Project Kanya High School Karon is a Hindi-medium girls only institution established at Karo in 2006. It has facilities for teaching in class IX and class X.
