= Palojori =

Palojori Hat Palajojori
- Community development block
- Coordinates: 24°14′18″N 87°0′38″E
- Country: India
- State: Jharkhand
- District: Deoghar

Government
  - Type: Federal democracy

Area
  - Total: 303.22 km^{2} (117.07 sq mi)
- Elevation: 145 m (476 ft)

Population (2011)
  - Total: 161,281
  - Density: 531.89/km^{2} (1,377.6/sq mi)

Languages
  - Official: Hindi, Santali, Urdu

Literacy (2011)
  - Total literates: 79,146 (60.27%)
- Time zone: UTC+5:30 (IST)
- PIN: 814146 (Palojori)
- Telephone/STD code: 06431
- Vehicle registration: JH-15
- Lok Sabha constituency: Dumka
- Vidhan Sabha constituency: Sarath
- Website: deoghar.nic.in

Palojori is a community development block that forms an administrative division in the Madhupur subdivision of the Deoghar district, Jharkhand state, India.

== Geography ==
Palojori, the eponymous CD block headquarters, is located at 24°14′18″N 87°0′38″E.

It is located 50 km from Deoghar, the district headquarters.

Deoghar district, a plateau region, is broadly divided into two sub-micro regions – the Dumka-Godda Uplands and Deoghar Uplands. The Dumka-Godda Uplands covers the north-eastern portion of the district. It has an elevation of 753 metres (2,470 ft) above mean sea level. The Deoghar Uplands covers the south-western portion of the district.

There are some isolated peaks in the district, including Phuljori (2,312 ft; 705 m), 18 miles (29 km) from Madhupur, Degaria (1,716 ft; 523 m), 3 miles (4.8 km) from Baidyanath Junction, Patharda (1,603 ft; 489 m), 8 miles (13 km) from Madhupur, Tirkut Parvat (2,470 ft; 750 m), 10 miles (16 km) from Deoghar on the Dumka-Deoghar Road.

Palojori CD block is bounded by Sonaraithari CD block on the north, Jama and Masalia CD blocks in Dumka district on the east, Karmatanr and Fatehpur CD blocks in Jamtara district on the south, and Sarath CD block on the west.

Palojori CD block has an area of 303.22 km^{2} (117.07 sq mi). Palojori police station serves this block. Headquarters of this CD block is at Palojori village.

Gram panchayats in Palojori CD block are Jivnaband, Kachuwasoli, Dudhani, Basbutia, Kunjbona, Palojori, Bhurkundi, Sagarajore, Bandhdih, Matiyara, Mahuadabar, Basaha, Dhawa, Patharghatia, Pharudih, Birajpur, Kanki, Rahuwadih, Khaga, Barjori, Jamua, Kunjora, Simalgada, Kasraydih, and Bagdaha.

== Demographics ==
=== Population ===
As per the 2011 Census of India, Palojori CD block had a total population of 161,281, all of which were rural. There were 82,593 (51%) males and 78,688 (49%) females. Population below 6 years was 29,568. Scheduled Castes numbered 11,778 (7.30%) and Scheduled Tribes numbered 45,189 (28.02%).

=== Literacy ===
As of 2011 census, the total number of literates in Palojori CD Block was 79,146 (60.27% of the population over 6 years) out of which 50,147 (63%) were males and 28,999 (37%) were females. The gender disparity (the difference between female and male literacy rates) was 18%.

See also – List of Jharkhand districts ranked by literacy rate

Literacy in CD Blocks of
Deoghar district
Deoghar – 63.24%
Mohanpur – 58.66%
Sarwan – 63.39%
Sonaraithari – 58.03%
Devipur – 59.43%
Madhupur – 59.57%
Margomunda – 58.46%
Karon – 59.61%
Sarath – 62.63%
Palojori – 60.27%
Source: 2011 Census: CD Block Wise
Primary Census Abstract Data

=== Language and religion ===
Religions in Palojori block (2011)
Religion	Percent
Hinduism	65.32%
Islam	31.13%
Sarna	2.94%
Other or not stated	0.61%

Languages of Palojori block (2011)
1. Khortha (49.4%)
2. Santali (26.2%)
3. Urdu (10.8%)
4. Bengali (8.61%)
5. Hindi (2.90%)
6. Others (2.15%)

At the time of the 2011 census, 49.39% of the population spoke Khortha, 26.18% Santali, 10.77% Urdu, 8.61% Bengali and 2.90% Hindi as their first language.

== Rural poverty ==
50-60% of the population of Deoghar district were in the BPL category in 2004–2005, being in the same category as Pakur, Sahebganj and Garhwa districts. Rural poverty in Jharkhand declined from 66% in 1993–94 to 46% in 2004–05. In 2011, it has come down to 39.1%.

== Economy ==
=== Livelihood ===
Livelihood
in Palojori CD block
1. Cultivators (26.0%)
2. Agricultural labourers (51.7%)
3. Household industries (4.09%)
4. Other Workers (18.2%)

In Palojori CD block in 2011, amongst the class of total workers, cultivators numbered 16,808 and formed 26.02%, agricultural labourers numbered 33,415 and formed 51.73%, household industry workers numbered 2,643 and formed 4.09% and other workers numbered 11,730 and formed 18.16%. Total workers numbered 64,596 and formed 40.05% of the total population. Non-workers numbered 96,685 and formed 59.95% of total population.

Note: In the census records a person is considered a cultivator, if the person is engaged in cultivation/ supervision of land owned. When a person who works on another person's land for wages in cash or kind or share, is regarded as an agricultural labourer. Household industry is defined as an industry conducted by one or more members of the family within the household or village, and one that does not qualify for registration as a factory under the Factories Act. Other workers are persons engaged in some economic activity other than cultivators, agricultural labourers and household workers. It includes factory, mining, plantation, transport and office workers, those engaged in business and commerce, teachers and entertainment artistes.

=== Infrastructure ===
There are 268 inhabited villages in Palojori CD block. In 2011, 207 villages had power supply. 16 villages had tap water (treated/ untreated), 250 villages had well water (covered/ uncovered), 242 villages had hand pumps, and 11 villages had no drinking water facility. 18 villages had post offices, 11 villages had sub post offices, 4 villages had telephones (land lines), 32 villages had public call offices and 111 villages had mobile phone coverage. 10 villages had bank branches, 267 villages had ATMs, 9 villages had agricultural credit societies, 8 villages had cinema/ video halls, 8 villages had public library and public reading rooms. 50 villages had public distribution system, 18 villages had weekly haat (market) and 93 villages had assembly polling stations.

=== Agriculture ===
The agricultural sector absorbs around two-thirds of the workforce in the district. In Palojori CD block, the cultivable area formed 42.53% of the total area, and the irrigated area formed 24.27% of the cultivable area.

Jungles in the plain areas have almost been cleared and even hills are becoming naked in an area once known for its extensive forests.

=== Backward Regions Grant Fund ===
Deoghar district is listed as a backward region and receives financial support from the Backward Regions Grant Fund. The fund created by the Government of India is designed to redress regional imbalances in development. As of 2012, 272 districts across the country were listed under this scheme. The list includes 21 districts of Jharkhand.

== Education ==
Palojori CD block had 83 villages with pre-primary schools, 177 villages with primary schools, 69 villages with middle schools, 8 villages with secondary schools, 3 villages with senior secondary schools, 87 villages with no educational facility.
.*Senior secondary schools are also known as Inter colleges in Jharkhand

== Healthcare ==
Palojori CD block had 3 villages with primary health centres, 14 villages with primary health subcentres, 2 village with maternity and child welfare centre, 1 village with allopathic hospital, 2 villages with dispensaries, 1 village with veterinary hospital, 1 village with family welfare centre, 3 villages with medicine shops.
.*Private medical practitioners, alternative medicine etc. not included
