= Deoghar subdivision =

- Subdivision
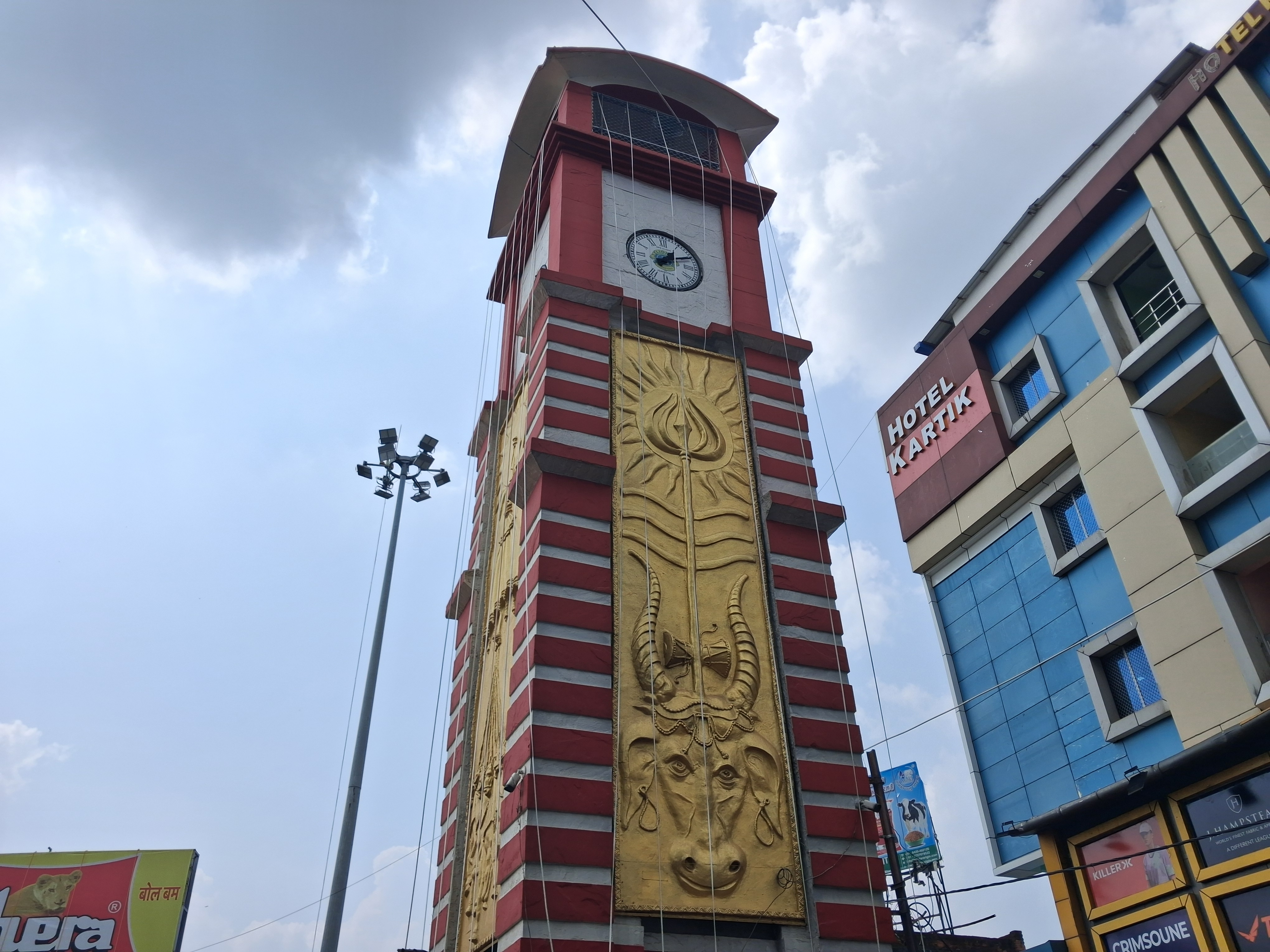
- Tower Chowk, a prominent landmark in Deoghar

- Location in Jharkhand, India Deoghar subdivision (India)
- Coordinates: 24.487°N 86.694°E
- Country: India
- State: Jharkhand
- District: Deoghar
- Headquarters: Deoghar

Area
  - Total: 1,346.26 km^{2} (519.79 sq mi)

Population
  - Total: 795,822
  - Density: 591.135/km^{2} (1,531.03/sq mi)

Languages
  - Official: Hindi, Urdu
- Time zone: UTC+5:30 (IST)
- Website: deoghar.nic.in

Deoghar subdivision is an administrative subdivision of the Deoghar district in the Santhal Pargana division in the state of Jharkhand, India.

== History ==
As a result of the Santhal rebellion, Act XXXVII of 1855 was passed by the British Raj, and a separate district called Santhal Pargana was carved out of parts of Birbhum and Bhagalpur districts. Santhal Pargana had four sub-districts – Dumka, Godda, Deoghar and Rajmahal. Subsequently, Santal Pargana district comprised Dumka, Deoghar, Sahibganj, Godda, Pakur and Jamtara sub-divisions. In 1983 Deoghar, Sahibganj and Godda subdivisions were given district status.

== Administrative set up ==
Deoghar district has two subdivisions: Deoghar and Madhupur. Deoghar, Mohanpur, Sarwan, Devipur and Sonaraithari community development blocks and Deoghar city are in Deoghar subdivision.

Note: The website of the district administration mentions two subdivisions with their names, but does not mention the names of the CD blocks in each subdivision. The District Census Handbook, Deoghar, mentions only 8 CD blocks (4 in each subdivision), and leaves out 2 CD blocks. According to the map of the district, it seems logical that, among the two left out blocks, Sonaraithari CD block is in Deoghar subdivision and Margomunda CD block is in Madhupur subdivision.

Deoghar district has two subdivisions:

Subdivision	Headquarters	Area km^{2}	Population (2011)	Rural population % (2011)	Urban population % (2011)
Deoghar	Deoghar	1,346.26	795,822	74.48	25.52
Madhupur	Madhupur	1,199.60	696,251	92.07	7.93

Cities, towns and locations in the Deoghar, Dumka and Jamtara districts in Santhal Pargana Division
M: Municipality, CT: census town, R: Rural/ Urban centre, D: Dam,
Owing to space constraints in the small map, the actual locations in a larger map may vary slightly

== Demographics ==
According to the 2011 Census of India data, Deoghar subdivision, in Deoghar district, had a total population of 795,822. There were 416,414 (52%) males and 379,418 (48%) females. Scheduled castes numbered 112,074 (14.08%) and scheduled tribes numbered 58,649 (7.37%). Literacy rate was 55.58%.

See also – List of Jharkhand districts ranked by literacy rate

== Police stations ==
Police stations in Deoghar subdivision are at:

1. Town
2. Kunda
3. Mahila
4. Jasidih
5. Devipur
6. Mohanpur
7. Sarwan
8. Sonaraithri

== Blocks ==
Community development blocks in Deoghar subdivision are:

CD Block	Headquarters	Area km^{2}	Population (2011)	SC %	ST %	Literacy rate %	CT
Deoghar	Deoghar	288.50	142,966	18.56	7.44	63.24	-
Mohanpur	Mohanpur	362.15	175,845	13.63	10.26	58.66	-
Sarwan	Sarwan	170.98	90,757	16.45	6.98	63.39	-
Devipur	Devipur	266.27	107,015	13.35	11.91	50.43	-
Sonaraithari	Sonaraithari	138.76	76,116	9.58	10.83	58.03	-

== Education ==
In 2011, in the CD blocks of Deoghar subdivision out of a total 1,231 inhabited villages there were 189 villages with pre-primary schools, 685 villages with primary schools, 282 villages with middle schools, 24 villages with secondary schools, 20 villages with senior secondary schools, 7 villages with non-formal training centres, 464 villages with no educational facility.
.*Senior secondary schools are also known as Inter colleges in Jharkhand

== Healthcare ==
In 2011, in the CD blocks of Deoghar subdivision there were 28 villages with primary health centres, 49 villages with primary health subcentres, 33 villages with maternity and child welfare centres, 4 villages with allopathic hospitals, 7 villages with dispensaries, 13 villages with veterinary hospitals, 10 villages with family welfare centres, 97 villages with medicine shops.
.*Private medical practitioners, alternative medicine etc. not included
