= Sonaraithari, Deoghar =

Sonaraithari
- Village
- Location in Jharkhand, India Sonaraithari (India)
- Coordinates: 24.357778°N 86.898889°E
- Country: India
- State: Jharkhand
- District: Deoghar

Population (2011)
  - Total: 3,538

Languages .*For language details see Sonaraithari#Language and religion
  - Official: Hindi, Urdu
- Time zone: UTC+5:30 (IST)
- PIN: 814150
- Telephone/ STD code: 06432
- Lok Sabha constituency: Godda
- Vidhan Sabha constituency: Jarmundi
- Website: deoghar.nic.in

Sonaraithari is a village in Sonaraithari CD block in the Deoghar subdivision of the Deoghar district in the Indian state of Jharkhand.

== Geography ==
Cities, towns and locations in the Deoghar, Dumka and Jamtara districts in Santhal Pargana Division
M: Municipality, CT: census town, R: Rural/ Urban centre, D: Dam,
Owing to space constraints in the small map, the actual locations in a larger map may vary slightly

=== Location ===
Sonaraithari is located at 24.357778°N 86.898889°E.

=== Overview ===
The map shows a large area, which is a plateau with low hills, except in the eastern portion where the Rajmahal hills intrude into this area and the Ramgarh hills are there. The south-western portion is just a rolling upland. The entire area is overwhelmingly rural with only small pockets of urbanisation.

Note: The full screen map is interesting. All places marked on the map are linked in the full screen map and one can easily move on to another page of his/her choice. Enlarge the full screen map to see what else is there – one gets railway connections, many more road connections and so on.

=== Area ===
Sonaraithari has an area of 221 hectares (550 acres).

== Demographics ==
According to the 2011 Census of India, Sonaraithari had a total population of 3,538, of which 1,847 (52%) were males and 1,691 (48%) were females. Population in the age range 0–6 years was 639. The total number of literate persons in Sonaraithari was 2,899 (64.19% of the population over 6 years).

== Civic administration ==
=== Police station ===
There is a police station at Sonaraithari village.

=== CD block HQ ===
Headquarters of Sonaraithari CD block is at Sonaraithari village.

== Education ==
Government High School Sonaraithari is a Hindi-medium coeducational institution established in 1966. It has facilities for teaching in class IX and X.
