= Sonaraithari =

- Community development block
- Coordinates: 24°21′28″N 86°53′56″E
- Country: India
- State: Jharkhand
- District: Deoghar

Government
  - Type: Federal democracy

Area
  - Total: 138.76 km^{2} (53.58 sq mi)
- Elevation: 268 m (879 ft)

Population (2011)
  - Total: 76,116
  - Density: 548.54/km^{2} (1,420.7/sq mi)

Languages
  - Official: Hindi, Urdu

Literacy (2011)
  - Total literates: 35,493 (58.03%)
- Time zone: UTC+5:30 (IST)
- PIN: 814150 (Sonaraithari)
- Telephone/STD code: 06432
- Vehicle registration: JH-15
- Lok Sabha constituency: Godda
- Vidhan Sabha constituency: Jarmundi
- Website: deoghar.nic.in

Sonaraithari (also spelled Sona Rai Thari, Sonaraythadi) is a community development block that forms an administrative division in the Deoghar subdivision of the Deoghar district, Jharkhand state,

== Geography ==
Sonaraithari, the eponymous CD block headquarters, is located at 24°21′28″N 86°53′56″E.

It is located 25 km from Deoghar, the district headquarters.

Deoghar district, a plateau region, is broadly divided into two sub-micro regions – the Dumka-Godda Uplands and Deoghar Uplands. The Dumka-Godda Uplands covers the north-eastern portion of the district. It has an elevation of 753 metres (2,470 ft) above mean sea level. The Deoghar Uplands covers the south-western portion of the district.

There are some isolated peaks in the district – Phuljori (2,312 ft), 18 miles from Madhupur, Degaria (1,716 ft), 3 miles from Baidyanath Junction, Patharda (1,603 ft), 8 miles from Madhupur, Tirkut Parvat (2,470 ft), 10 miles from Deoghar on the Dumka-Deoghar Road and some more.

Sonaraithari CD block is bounded by Mohanpur CD block on the north, Jarmundi CD block in Dumka district on the east, Palojori and Sarath CD blocks on the south, and Sarwan CD block on the west.

Sonaraithari CD block has an area of 138.76 km^{2}.Sonaraithari police station serves this block. Headquarters of this CD block is at Sonaraithari village.

Gram panchayats in Sonaraithari CD block are: Bhorajamua, Binjha, Brahmotara, Dondiya, Jarka, Jarka, Khijuriya, Kusumthar, Magadih, Mahapur, Sonaraithadi and Thadilapra.

== Demographics ==
=== Population ===
As per the 2011 Census of India Sonaraitharhi CD block had a total population of 76,116, all of which were rural. There were 39,394 (52%) males and 36,722 (48%) females. Population below 6 years was 14,957. Scheduled Castes numbered 7,291 (9.58%) and Scheduled Tribes numbered 8,244 (10.83%).

=== Literacy ===
As of 2011 census, the total number of literates in Sona Rai Tharhi CD Block was 35,493 (58.03% of the population over 6 years) out of which 23,072 (65%) were males and 12,421 (35%) were females. The gender disparity (the difference between female and male literacy rates) was 30%.

See also – List of Jharkhand districts ranked by literacy rate

Literacy in CD Blocks of
Deoghar district
Deoghar – 63.24%
Mohanpur – 58.66%
Sarwan – 63.39%
Sonaraithari – 58.03%
Devipur – 59.43%
Madhupur – 59.57%
Margomunda – 58.46%
Karon – 59.61%
Sarath – 62.63%
Palojori – 60.27%
Source: 2011 Census: CD Block Wise
Primary Census Abstract Data

=== Language and religion ===
Religions in Sona Rai Thari block (2011)
Religion	Percent
Hinduism	71.10%
Islam	27.51%
Sarna	0.90%
Other or not stated	0.49%

Languages of Sona Rai Thari block (2011)
1. Khortha (86.5%)
2. Santali (8.61%)
3. Urdu (2.25%)
4. Hindi (1.71%)
5. Others (0.89%)

At the time of the 2011 census, 86.54% of the population spoke Khortha, 8.61% Santali, 2.25% Urdu and 1.71% Hindi as their first language.

== Rural poverty ==
50-60% of the population of Deoghar district were in the BPL category in 2004–2005, being in the same category as Pakur, Sahebganj and Garhwa districts. Rural poverty in Jharkhand declined from 66% in 1993–94 to 46% in 2004–05. In 2011, it has come down to 39.1%.

== Economy ==
=== Livelihood ===
Livelihood
in Sonaraithari CD block
1. Cultivators (24.5%)
2. Agricultural labourers (42.9%)
3. Household industries (16.2%)
4. Other Workers (16.4%)

In Sonaraithari CD block in 2011, amongst the class of total workers, cultivators numbered 9,139 and formed 24.51%, agricultural labourers numbered 16,000 and formed 42.92%, household industry workers numbered 6,032 and formed 16.18% and other workers numbered 6,110 and formed 16.39%. Total workers numbered 37,281 and formed 48.98% of the total population. Non-workers numbered 38,835 and formed 51.02% of total population.

Note: In the census records a person is considered a cultivator, if the person is engaged in cultivation/ supervision of land owned. When a person who works on another person's land for wages in cash or kind or share, is regarded as an agricultural labourer. Household industry is defined as an industry conducted by one or more members of the family within the household or village, and one that does not qualify for registration as a factory under the Factories Act. Other workers are persons engaged in some economic activity other than cultivators, agricultural labourers and household workers. It includes factory, mining, plantation, transport and office workers, those engaged in business and commerce, teachers and entertainment artistes.

=== Infrastructure ===
There are 196 inhabited villages in Sonaraithari CD block. In 2011, 167 villages had power supply. 25 villages had treated or untreated tap water, 177 villages had well water (covered/ uncovered), 174 villages had hand pumps, and 15 villages had no drinking water facility. 14 villages had post offices, 6 villages had sub post offices, 2 villages had telephones (land lines), 13 villages had public call offices and 67 villages had mobile phone coverage. 4 villages had bank branches, 196 villages had ATMs, 2 villages had agricultural credit societies. 38 villages had public distribution system, 14 villages had weekly haat (market) and 47 villages had assembly polling stations.

=== Agriculture ===
The agricultural sector absorbs around two-thirds of the workforce in the district. In Sonaraithari CD block, the cultivable area formed 41.32% of the total area, and the irrigated area formed 22.79% of the cultivable area.

Jungles in the plain areas have almost been cleared and even hills are becoming naked in an area once known for its extensive forests.

=== Backward Regions Grant Fund ===
Deoghar district is listed as a backward region and receives financial support from the Backward Regions Grant Fund. The fund created by the Government of India is designed to redress regional imbalances in development. As of 2012, 272 districts across the country were listed under this scheme. The list includes 21 districts of Jharkhand.

== Education ==
Sonaraithari CD block had 46 villages with pre-primary schools, 108 villages with primary schools, 26 villages with middle schools, 2 villages with secondary schools, 1 village with senior secondary school, 86 villages with no educational facility.
.*Senior secondary schools are also known as Inter colleges in Jharkhand

== Healthcare ==
Sonaraithari CD block had 10 villages with primary health centres, 8 villages with primary health subcentres, 1 village with maternity and child welfare centre, 1 village with TB clinic, 1 village with allopathic hospital, 10 villages with veterinary hospitals, 1 village with family welfare centre, 9 villages with medicine shops.
.*Private medical practitioners, alternative medicine etc. not included
