= Chitra, Deoghar =

Chitra
- Village
- Location in Jharkhand, India Chitra (India)
- Coordinates: 24.120567°N 86.866678°E
- Country: India
- State: Jharkhand
- District: Deoghar

Population (2011)
  - Total: 2,430

Languages .*For language details see Sarath, Deoghar#Language and religion
  - Official: Hindi, Urdu
- Time zone: UTC+5:30 (IST)
- PIN: 815351
- Telephone/ STD code: 06438
- Lok Sabha constituency: Dumka
- Vidhan Sabha constituency: Sarath
- Website: deoghar.nic.in

Chitra is a village in Sarath CD block in the Madhupur subdivision of the Deoghar district in the Indian state of Jharkhand.

== Geography ==
Cities, towns and locations in the Deoghar, Dumka and Jamtara districts in Santhal Pargana Division
M: Municipality, CT: census town, R: Rural/ Urban centre, D: Dam,
Owing to space constraints in the small map, the actual locations in a larger map may vary slightly

=== Location ===
Chitra is located at 24.120567°N 86.866678°E.

=== Overview ===
The map shows a large area, which is a plateau with low hills, except in the eastern portion where the Rajmahal hills intrude into this area and the Ramgarh hills are there. The south-western portion is just a rolling upland. The entire area is overwhelmingly rural with only small pockets of urbanisation.

Note: The full screen map is interesting. All places marked on the map are linked in the full screen map and one can easily move on to another page of his/her choice. Enlarge the full screen map to see what else is there – one gets railway connections, many more road connections and so on.

=== Area ===
Chitra has an area of 171 hectares (420 acres).

== Demographics ==
According to the 2011 Census of India, Chitra had a total population of 2,430, of which 1,252 (52%) were males and 1,172 (48%) were females. Population in the age range 0–6 years was 330. The total number of literate persons in Chitra was 2,100 (76.86% of the population over 6 years).

== Civic administration ==
=== Police station ===
There is a police station at Chitra.

== Chitra Coalfield ==
Chitra Coalfield is operated as a part of SP Mines Area of Eastern Coalfields.

== Education ==
DAV Public School at Chitra was established in 1995. It secured affiliation of CBSE for class X in 1999 and a senior secondary school (plus two level) in 2003. It has been set up in association with ECL.

Chitra Inter College is a Hindi-medium coeducational institution established in 1993. It has facilities for teaching in class XI and class XII.

High School Chitra is a Hindi-medium coeducational institution established in 1974. It has facilities for teaching in class IX and class X.
