= Devipur, Deoghar (village) =

Devipur
- Village
- Location in Jharkhand, India Devipur (India)
- Coordinates: 24.451944°N 86.507144°E
- Country: India
- State: Jharkhand
- District: Deoghar

Population (2011)
  - Total: 199

Languages .(*For language details see Devipur, Deoghar#Language and religion)
  - Official: Hindi, Urdu
- Time zone: UTC+5:30 (IST)
- PIN: 814152
- Telephone/ STD code: 06432
- Lok Sabha constituency: Godda
- Vidhan Sabha constituency: Madhupur
- Website: deoghar.nic.in

Devipur is a village in Devipur CD block in the Deoghar subdivision of the Deoghar district in the Indian state of Jharkhand.

== Geography ==
Cities, towns and locations in the Deoghar, Dumka and Jamtara districts in Santhal Pargana Division
M: Municipality, CT: census town, R: Rural/ Urban centre, D: Dam,
Owing to space constraints in the small map, the actual locations in a larger map may vary slightly

=== Overview ===
The map shows a large area, which is a plateau with low hills, except in the eastern portion where the Rajmahal hills intrude into this area and the Ramgarh hills are there. The south-western portion is just a rolling upland. The entire area is overwhelmingly rural with only small pockets of urbanisation.

Note: The full screen map is interesting. All places marked on the map are linked in the full screen map and one can easily move on to another page of his/her choice. Enlarge the full screen map to see what else is there – one gets railway connections, many more road connections and so on.

=== Area ===
Pathria has an area of 158 hectares (390 acres).

=== Location ===
Devipur is located at 24.451944°N 86.507144°E.

In the map of Devipur CD block in the District Census Handbook, Deoghar, Devipur is shown as being part of Pathria mouza (MDDS PLCN - 212).

== Demographics ==
According to the 2011 Census of India, Pathria had a total population of 199, of which 108 (54%) were males and 91 (46%) were females. Population in the age range 0–6 years was 28. The total number of literate persons in Pathria was 171 (69.59% of the population over 6 years).

== Civic administration ==
=== Police station ===
There is a police station at Devipur village.

=== CD block HQ ===
Headquarters of Devipur CD block is at Devipur village.

== Education ==
Kasturba Gandhi Balika Vidyalaya, Devipur, is a Hindi-medium girls only institution established in 2005. It has facilities for teaching from class VI to class XII.

The English-medium DAV Public School at Kendua was established in 2013 and as of 2020 is functioning from class I to class VIII.

== Healthcare ==
The prestigious AIIMs, Deoghar, has been set up at Devipur.
