= Margomunda, Deoghar =

Margomunda
- Village
- Location in Jharkhand, India Margomunda (India)
- Coordinates: 24.165163°N 86.587578°E
- Country 24.165163,86.587578: India
- State: Jharkhand
- District: Deoghar

Population (2011)
  - Total: 2,727

Languages .*For language details see Margomunda#Language and religion
  - Official: Hindi, Urdu
- Time zone: UTC+5:30 (IST)
- PIN: 815353
- Telephone/ STD code: 06438
- Lok Sabha constituency: Godda
- Vidhan Sabha constituency: Madhupur
- Website: deoghar.nic.in

Margomunda is a village in Margomunda CD block in the Madhupur subdivision of the Deoghar district in the Indian state of Jharkhand.

== Geography ==
Cities, towns and locations in the Deoghar, Dumka and Jamtara districts in Santhal Pargana Division
M: Municipality, CT: census town, R: Rural/ Urban centre, D: Dam,
Owing to space constraints in the small map, the actual locations in a larger map may vary slightly

=== Location ===
Margomunda is located at 24.165163°N 86.587578°E.

=== Overview ===
The map shows a large area, which is a plateau with low hills, except in the eastern portion where the Rajmahal hills intrude into this area and the Ramgarh hills are there. The south-western portion is just a rolling upland. The entire area is overwhelmingly rural with only small pockets of urbanisation.

Note: The full screen map is interesting. All places marked on the map are linked in the full screen map and one can easily move on to another page of his/her choice. Enlarge the full screen map to see what else is there – one gets railway connections, many more road connections and so on.

=== Area ===
Margomunda has an area of 204 hectares (500 acres).

== Demographics ==
According to the 2011 Census of India, Margomunda had a total population of 1,680, of which 871 (52%) were males and 809 (48%) were females. Population in the age range 0–6 years was 271. The total number of literate persons in Margomunda was 1,409 (64.23% of the population over 6 years).

== Civic administration ==
=== Police station ===
There is a police station at Margomunda village.

=== CD block HQ ===
Headquarters of Margomunda CD block is at Margomunda village.

== Education ==
Rajkiyakrit High School Margomunda is a Hindi-medium coeducational institution established in 1978. It has facilities for teaching in class IX and X.
