= Sarwan, Deoghar =

Sarwan
- Community development block
- Coordinates: 24°22′43″N 86°46′23″E
- Country: India
- State: Jharkhand
- District: Deoghar

Government
  - Type: Federal democracy

Area
  - Total: 170.98 km^{2} (66.02 sq mi)
- Elevation: 268 m (879 ft)

Population (2011)
  - Total: 90,757
  - Density: 530.80/km^{2} (1,374.8/sq mi)

Languages
  - Official: Hindi, Urdu

Literacy (2011)
  - Total literates: 47,027 (63.39%)
- Time zone: UTC+5:30 (IST)
- PIN: 814150 (Sarwan)
- Telephone/STD code: 06432
- Vehicle registration: JH-15
- Lok Sabha constituency: Godda
- Vidhan Sabha constituency: Jarmundi
- Website: deoghar.nic.in

Sarwan is a community development block that forms an administrative division in the Deoghar subdivision in the Deoghar district, Jharkhand state, India.

== Geography ==
Sarwan, the eponymous CD block headquarters, is located at 24°22′43″N 86°46′23″E.

It is located 14 km from Deoghar, the district headquarters.

Deoghar district, a plateau region, is broadly divided into two sub-micro regions – the Dumka-Godda Uplands and Deoghar Uplands. The Dumka-Godda Uplands covers the north-eastern portion of the district. It has an elevation of 753 metres (2,470 ft) above mean sea level. The Deoghar Uplands covers the south-western portion of the district.

The district has some isolated peaks, which include Phuljori (2,312 ft), 18 miles from Madhupur, Degaria (1,716 ft), 3 miles from Baidyanath Junction, Patharda (1,603 ft), 8 miles from Madhupur, and Tirkut Parvat (2,470 ft), 10 miles from Deoghar on the Dumka-Deoghar Road.

Sarwan CD block is bounded by Mohanpur CD block on the north, Sonaraithari CD block on the east, Sarath CD block on the south, and Devipur and Deoghar CD blocks on the west.

Sarwan CD block has an area of 170.98 km^{2}.Sarwan police station serves this block. Headquarters of this CD block is at Sarwan.

Gram panchayats in Sarwan CD block are Baijukura, Bandajori, Banwariya, Bhandaro, Dahuwa, Dakay, Dondia, Jiyakhara, Kushmaha, Lakhoriya, Narangi, Pahariya, Rakti and Sarwan,

== Demographics ==
=== Population ===
As per the 2011 Census of India Sarwan CD block had a total population of 90,757, all of which were rural. There were 47,269 (52%) males and 43,488 (48%) females. Population below 6 years was 16,570. Scheduled Castes numbered 14,932 (16.45%) and Scheduled Tribes numbered 6,338 (6.98%).

=== Literacy ===
As of 2011 census, the total number of literates in Sarwan CD Block was 47,027 (63.39% of the population over 6 years) out of whom 29,432 (63%) were males and 17,595 (37%) were females. The gender disparity (the difference between female and male literacy rates) was 26%.

See also – List of Jharkhand districts ranked by literacy rate

Literacy in CD Blocks of
Deoghar district
Deoghar – 63.24%
Mohanpur – 58.66%
Sarwan – 63.39%
Sonaraithari – 58.03%
Devipur – 59.43%
Madhupur – 59.57%
Margomunda – 58.46%
Karon – 59.61%
Sarath – 62.63%
Palojori – 60.27%
Source: 2011 Census: CD Block Wise
Primary Census Abstract Data

=== Language and religion ===
Religions in Sarwan block (2011)
| Religion | Percent |
| Hinduism | 88.62% |
| Islam | 11.18% |
| Other or not stated | 0.20% |

Languages of Sarwan block (2011)
1. Khortha (89.8%)
2. Hindi (5.14%)
3. Santali (3.11%)
4. Others (1.90%)

At the time of the 2011 census, 89.85% of the population spoke Khortha, 5.14% Hindi and 3.11% Santali as their first language.

== Rural poverty ==
50-60% of the population of Deoghar district were in the BPL category in 2004–2005, being in the same category as Pakur, Sahebganj and Garhwa districts. Rural poverty in Jharkhand declined from 66% in 1993–94 to 46% in 2004–05. In 2011, it has come down to 39.1%.

== Economy ==
=== Livelihood ===
Livelihood
in Sarwan CD block
1. Cultivators (32.7%)
2. Agricultural labourers (36.6%)
3. Household industries (6.89%)
4. Other Workers (23.8%)

In Sarwan CD block in 2011, amongst the class of total workers, cultivators numbered 12,436 and formed 32.72%, agricultural labourers numbered 13,913 and formed 36.60%, household industry workers numbered 2,619 and formed 6.89% and other workers numbered 9,041 and formed 23.79%. Total workers numbered 38,009and formed 41.88% of the total population. Non-workers numbered 52,748 and formed 58.72% of total population.

Note: In the census records a person is considered a cultivator, if the person is engaged in cultivation/ supervision of land owned. When a person who works on another person's land for wages in cash or kind or share, is regarded as an agricultural labourer. Household industry is defined as an industry conducted by one or more members of the family within the household or village, and one that does not qualify for registration as a factory under the Factories Act. Other workers are persons engaged in some economic activity other than cultivators, agricultural labourers and household workers. It includes factory, mining, plantation, transport and office workers, those engaged in business and commerce, teachers and entertainment artistes.

=== Infrastructure ===
There are 203 inhabited villages in Sarwan CD block. In 2011, 159 villages had power supply. 13 villages had tap water (treated/ untreated), 187 villages had well water (covered/ uncovered), 176 villages had hand pumps, and 8 villages had no drinking water facility. 18 villages had post offices, 17 villages had sub post offices, 5 villages had telephones (land lines), 37 villages had public call offices and 122 villages had mobile phone coverage. 13 villages had bank branches, 203 villages had ATMs, 4 villages had agricultural credit societies, 4 villages had cinema/ video halls, 4 villages had public library and public reading rooms. 32 villages had public distribution system, 10 villages had weekly haat (market) and 58 villages had assembly polling stations.

=== Agriculture ===
The agricultural sector absorbs around two-thirds of the workforce in the district. In Sarwan CD block, the cultivable area formed 56.58% of the total area, and the irrigated area formed 22.07% of the cultivable area.

Jungles in the plain areas have almost been cleared and even hills are becoming naked in an area once known for its extensive forests.

=== Backward Regions Grant Fund ===
Deoghar district is listed as a backward region and receives financial support from the Backward Regions Grant Fund. The fund created by the Government of India is designed to redress regional imbalances in development. As of 2012, 272 districts across the country were listed under this scheme. The list includes 21 districts of Jharkhand.

== Education ==
Sarwan CD block had 52 villages with pre-primary schools, 120 villages with primary schools, 47 villages with middle schools, 12 villages with secondary schools, 10 villages with senior secondary schools, 78 villages with no educational facility.
.*Senior secondary schools are also known as Inter colleges in Jharkhand

== Healthcare ==
Sarwan CD block had 4 villages with primary health centres, 3 villages with primary health subcentres, 1 village with maternity and child welfare centre, 1 village with TB clinic, 1 village with allopathic hospital, 1 village with dispensary, 1 village with family welfare centre, 8 villages with medicine shops.
.*Private medical practitioners, alternative medicine etc. not included 1 Ayusman Arogaya mandir situated at Roshan which provide Ayush system Health services Under Jharkhand Government Health Department.
