= Karon, Deoghar =

Karon Karongram
- Community development block
- Coordinates: 24°7′38″N 86°44′41″E
- Country: India
- State: Jharkhand
- District: Deoghar

Government
  - Type: Federal democracy

Area
  - Total: 157.21 km^{2} (60.70 sq mi)
- Elevation: 208 m (682 ft)

Population (2011)
  - Total: 88,251
  - Density: 561.36/km^{2} (1,453.9/sq mi)

Languages
  - Official: Hindi, Santali, Bangali, Urdu

Literacy (2011)
  - Total literates: 42,618 (63.54%)
- Time zone: UTC+5:30 (IST)
- PIN: 815357 (Karongram)
- Telephone/STD code: 06432
- Vehicle registration: JH 15
- Lok Sabha constituency: Godda
- Vidhan Sabha constituency: Madhupur
- Website: deoghar.nic.in

Karon is a community development block that forms an administrative division in the Madhupur subdivision of the Deoghar district, Jharkhand state, India.

== Geography ==
Karon, the eponymous CD block headquarters, is located at 24°7′38″N 86°44′41″E.

It is located 48 km towards south from Deoghar, the district headquarters and 198 km from state capital Ranchi.

Karon Pin code is 815357 and postal head office is Karogram .

This Place is in the border of the Deoghar District and Jamtara District. Jamtara District Narayanpur is west towards this place .

Deoghar district, a plateau region, is broadly divided into two sub-micro regions – the Dumka-Godda Uplands and Deoghar Uplands. The Dumka-Godda Uplands covers the north-eastern portion of the district. It has an elevation of 753 metres (2,470 ft) above mean sea level. The Deoghar Uplands covers the south-western portion of the district.

There are some isolated peaks in the district, which include Phuljori (2,312 ft), 18 miles from Madhupur, Degaria (1,716 ft), 3 miles from Baidyanath Junction, Patharda (1,603 ft), 8 miles from Madhupur, and Tirkut Parvat (2,470 ft), 10 miles from Deoghar on the Dumka-Deoghar Road.

Karon CD block is bounded by Madhupur CD block on the north, Sarath CD block on the east, Karmatanr CD block in Jamtara district on the south, and Margomunda CD block on the west.

Karon CD block has an area of 157.21 km^{2}.Karon police station serves this block. Headquarters of this CD block is at Karon village.

Gram panchayats in Karon CD block are Badhanadih, Badiya, Bara, Birangadia, Dindakoli, Ganjewari, Karown, Kasaiya, Nagadari, Pathrol, Ranidih, Saltar, Sirsa and Tekra.

== Demographics ==
=== Population ===
As per the 2011 Census of India Karon CD block had a total population of 88,251, all of which were rural. There were 45,317 (51%) males and 42,934 (49%) females. Population below 6 years was 16,759. Scheduled Castes numbered 11,017 (12.48%) and Scheduled Tribes numbered 12,683 (14.37%).

=== Literacy ===
As of 2011 census, the total number of literates in Karon CD block was 42,618 (59.61% of the population over age 6) out of whom 27,005 (63%) were males and 15,613 (37%) were females. The gender disparity (the difference between female and male literacy rates) was 26%.

See also – List of Jharkhand districts ranked by literacy rate

Literacy in CD Blocks of
Deoghar district
Deoghar – 63.24%
Mohanpur – 58.66%
Sarwan – 63.39%
Sonaraithari – 58.03%
Devipur – 59.43%
Madhupur – 59.57%
Margomunda – 58.46%
Karon – 59.61%
Sarath – 62.63%
Palojori – 60.27%
Source: 2011 Census: CD Block Wise
Primary Census Abstract Data

=== Language and religion ===
Religions in Karon block (2011)
Religion	Percent
Hinduism	75.73%
Islam	22.58%
Sarna	1.48%
Other or not stated	0.22%

Languages of Karon block (2011)
1. Khortha (73.7%)
2. Santali (13.0%)
3. Hindi (6.23%)
4. Bengali (3.94%)
5. Urdu (2.96%)
6. Others (0.21%)

At the time of the 2011 census, 73.69% of the population spoke Khortha, 12.97% Santali, 6.23% Hindi, 3.94% Bengali and 2.96% Urdu as their first language.

== Rural poverty ==
50-60% of the population of Deoghar district were in the BPL category in 2004–2005, being in the same category as Pakur, Sahebganj and Garhwa districts. Rural poverty in Jharkhand declined from 66% in 1993–94 to 46% in 2004–05. In 2011, it has come down to 39.1%.

== Economy ==
=== Livelihood ===
Livelihood
in Karon CD block
1. Cultivators (24.1%)
2. Agricultural labourers (40.4%)
3. Household industries (9.77%)
4. Other Workers (25.8%)

In Karon CD block in 2011, amongst the class of total workers, cultivators numbered 8,029 and formed 24.12%, agricultural labourers numbered 13,435 and formed 40.36%, household industry workers numbered 3,251 and formed 9.77% and other workers numbered 8,576 and formed 25.76%. Total workers numbered 33,291 and formed 37.72% of the total population. Non-workers numbered 54,960 and formed 62.28% of total population.

Note: In the census records a person is considered a cultivator, if the person is engaged in cultivation/ supervision of land owned. When a person who works on another person's land for wages in cash or kind or share, is regarded as an agricultural labourer. Household industry is defined as an industry conducted by one or more members of the family within the household or village, and one that does not qualify for registration as a factory under the Factories Act. Other workers are persons engaged in some economic activity other than cultivators, agricultural labourers and household workers. It includes factory, mining, plantation, transport and office workers, those engaged in business and commerce, teachers and entertainment artistes.

=== Infrastructure ===
There are 141 inhabited villages in Karon CD block. In 2011, 99 villages had power supply. Thirteen villages had tap water (treated/ untreated), 134 villages had well water (covered/ uncovered), 129 villages had hand pumps, and six villages had no drinking water facility. Eight villages had post offices, ten villages had sub post offices, six villages had telephones (land lines), 16 villages had public call offices and 57 villages had mobile phone coverage. Two villages had bank branches, 141 villages had ATMs, one village had agricultural credit society, one village had cinema/ video hall. 32 villages had public distribution system, thirteen villages had weekly haat (market) and 59 villages had assembly polling stations.

=== Agriculture ===
The agricultural sector absorbs around two-thirds of the workforce in the district. In Karon CD block, the cultivable area formed 39.11% of the total area, and the irrigated area formed 15.95% of the cultivable area.

Jungles in the plain areas have almost been cleared and even hills are becoming naked in an area once known for its extensive forests.

=== Coal ===
The principal coalfield of the Deoghar group is Jayanti Coalfield, located near Karon. The main part of the coalfield lies south-west of the Jainti River. It covers an area of 24 square miles.

=== Backward Regions Grant Fund ===
Deoghar district is listed as a backward region and receives financial support from the Backward Regions Grant Fund. The fund created by the Government of India is designed to redress regional imbalances in development. As of 2012, 272 districts across the country were listed under this scheme. The list includes 21 districts of Jharkhand.

== Education ==
Karon CD block had 27 villages with pre-primary schools, 106 villages with primary schools, 37 villages with middle schools, 3 villages with secondary schools, 1 village with senior secondary school, 31 villages with no educational facility.
.*Senior secondary schools are also known as Inter colleges in Jharkhand

== Healthcare ==
Karon CD block had 2 villages with primary health centres, 6 villages with primary health subcentres, 1 village with maternity and child welfare centre, 1 village with TB clinic, 3 villages with allopathic hospitals, x village with dispensary, x village with veterinary hospital, 1 village with family welfare centre, 11 villages with medicine shops.
.*Private medical practitioners, alternative medicine etc. not included
