= Devipur, Deoghar =

Devipur
- Community development block
- Coordinates: 24°27′7″N 86°37′37″E
- Country: India
- State: Jharkhand
- District: Deoghar

Government
  - Type: Federal democracy

Area
  - Total: 266.27 km^{2} (102.81 sq mi)
- Elevation: 242 m (794 ft)

Population (2011)
  - Total: 107,015
  - Density: 401.90/km^{2} (1,040.9/sq mi)

Languages
  - Official: Hindi, Urdu

Literacy (2011)
  - Total literates: 51,251 (59.43%)
- Time zone: UTC+5:30 (IST)
- Telephone/STD code: 06432
- Vehicle registration: JH-15
- Lok Sabha constituency: Godda
- Vidhan Sabha constituency: Madhupur
- Website: deoghar.nic.in

Devipur is a community development block that forms an administrative division in the Deoghar subdivision of the Deoghar district, Jharkhand state, India.

== Geography ==
Ramudih, a constituent village of Devipur CD block, is located at 24°27′7″N 86°37′37″E. It is located 22 km from Deoghar, the district headquarters.

Deoghar district, a plateau region, is broadly divided into two sub-micro regions – the Dumka-Godda Uplands and Deoghar Uplands. The Dumka-Godda Uplands covers the north-eastern portion of the district. It has an elevation of 753 metres (2,470 ft) above mean sea level. The Deoghar Uplands covers the south-western portion of the district.

There are some isolated peaks in the district, including Phuljori (2,312 ft), 18 miles from Madhupur, Degaria (1,716 ft), 3 miles from Baidyanath Junction, Patharda (1,603 ft), 8 miles from Madhupur, and Tirkut Parvat (2,470 ft), 10 miles from Deoghar on the Dumka-Deoghar Road.

Devipur CD block is bounded by Deoghar CD block on the north, Deoghar and Sarwan CD blocks on the east, Sarath and Madhupur CD blocks on the south, and Rajauli CD block in Nawada district of Bihar and Bengabad CD block in Giridih district on the west.

Devipur CD block has an area of 266.27 km^{2}.Devipur police station serves this block. Headquarters of this CD block is at Devipur village.

panchayats in Devipur CD block are: Amdiha, Baghmari, Barwan, Bhojpur, Daranga, Dhobana, Fulkari, Husainabad, Jhhumarbad, Jhhundi, Jitjorit, Kasathi, Mahuatand, Manpur, Rajpura, Ramudih and Tatkiyo Nawadih.

== Demographics ==
=== Population ===
As per the 2011 Census of India Devipur CD block had a total population of 107,015, all of which were rural. There were 55,679 (52%) males and 51,336 (48%) females. Population below 6 years was 20,784. Scheduled Castes numbered 14,290 (13.35%) and Scheduled Tribes numbered 12,746 (11.91%).

=== Literacy ===
As of 2011 census, the total number of literates in Devipur CD Block was 51,251 (59.43% of the population over 6 years) out of which 32,982 (64%) were males and 18,269 (36%) were females. The gender disparity (the difference between female and male literacy rates) was 28%.

See also – List of Jharkhand districts ranked by literacy rate

Literacy in CD Blocks of
Deoghar district
Deoghar – 63.24%
Mohanpur – 58.66%
Sarwan – 63.39%
Sonaraithari – 58.03%
Devipur – 59.43%
Madhupur – 59.57%
Margomunda – 58.46%
Karon – 59.61%
Sarath – 62.63%
Palojori – 60.27%
Source: 2011 Census: CD Block Wise
Primary Census Abstract Data

=== Language and religion ===
Religions in Devipur block (2011)
Religion	Percent
Hinduism	80.96%
Islam	17.31%
Sarna	1.48%
Other or not stated	0.26%

Languages of Devipur block (2011)
1. Khortha (81.6%)
2. Santali (8.15%)
3. Hindi (6.65%)
4. Urdu (2.38%)
5. Mundari (0.98%)
6. Others (0.21%)

At the time of the 2011 census, 81.63% of the population spoke Khortha, 8.15% Santali, 6.65% Hindi, 2.38% Urdu and 0.98% Munda as their first language.

== Rural poverty ==
50-60% of the population of Deoghar district were in the BPL category in 2004–2005, being in the same category as Pakur, Sahebganj and Garhwa districts. Rural poverty in Jharkhand declined from 66% in 1993–94 to 46% in 2004–05. In 2011, it has come down to 39.1%.

== Economy ==
=== Livelihood ===
Livelihood
in Devipur CD block
1. Cultivators (29.8%)
2. Agricultural labourers (52.2%)
3. Household industries (3.62%)
4. Other Workers (14.4%)

In Devipur CD block in 2011, amongst the class of total workers, cultivators numbered 10,974 and formed 29.76%, agricultural labourers numbered 19,267 and formed 52.25%, household industry workers numbered 1,336 and formed 3.62% and other workers numbered 5,299 and formed 14.37%. Total workers numbered 36,876 and formed 34.46% of the total population. Non-workers numbered 70,139 and formed 65.54% of total population.

Note: In the census records a person is considered a cultivator, if the person is engaged in cultivation/ supervision of land owned. When a person who works on another person's land for wages in cash or kind or share, is regarded as an agricultural labourer. Household industry is defined as an industry conducted by one or more members of the family within the household or village, and one that does not qualify for registration as a factory under the Factories Act. Other workers are persons engaged in some economic activity other than cultivators, agricultural labourers and household workers. It includes factory, mining, plantation, transport and office workers, those engaged in business and commerce, teachers and entertainment artistes.

=== Infrastructure ===
There are 223 inhabited villages in Devipur CD block. In 2011, 154 villages had power supply. 21 villages had tap water (treated/ untreated), 196 villages had well water (covered/ uncovered), 190 villages had hand pumps, and 22 villages had no drinking water facility. 22 villages had post offices, 17 villages had sub post offices, 8 villages had telephones (land lines), 10 villages had public call offices and 80 villages had mobile phone coverage. 6 villages had bank branches, 217 villages had ATMs, 6 villages had agricultural credit societies, 3 villages had cinema/ video halls, 3 villages had public library and public reading rooms. 65 villages had public distribution system, 21 villages had weekly haat (market) and 47 villages had assembly polling stations.

=== Agriculture ===
The agricultural sector absorbs around two-thirds of the workforce in the district. In Devipur CD block, the cultivable area formed 63.05% of the total area, and the irrigated area formed 9.22% of the cultivable area.

Jungles in the plain areas have almost been cleared and even hills are becoming naked in an area once known for its extensive forests.

=== Backward Regions Grant Fund ===
Deoghar district is listed as a backward region and receives financial support from the Backward Regions Grant Fund. The fund created by the Government of India is designed to redress regional imbalances in development. As of 2012, 272 districts across the country were listed under this scheme. The list includes 21 districts of Jharkhand.

== Education ==
Devipur CD block had 23 villages with pre-primary schools, 153 villages with primary schools, 58 villages with middle schools, 9 villages with secondary schools, 4 villages with senior secondary schools, 3 non-formal training centres, 1 special school for disabled, 65 villages with no educational facility.
.*Senior secondary schools are also known as Inter colleges in Jharkhand

== Healthcare ==
Devipur CD block had 7 villages with primary health centres, 13 villages with primary health subcentres, 6 villages with maternity and child welfare centres, 2 villages with TB clinic, 2 villages with allopathic hospitals, 1 village with dispensary, 2 villages with veterinary hospitals, 6 villages with family welfare centres, 17 villages with medicine shops.
.*Private medical practitioners, alternative medicine etc. not included

The prestigious AIIMs, Deoghar, has been set up at Devipur village.
