= Sarath, Deoghar =

Sarath
- Community development block
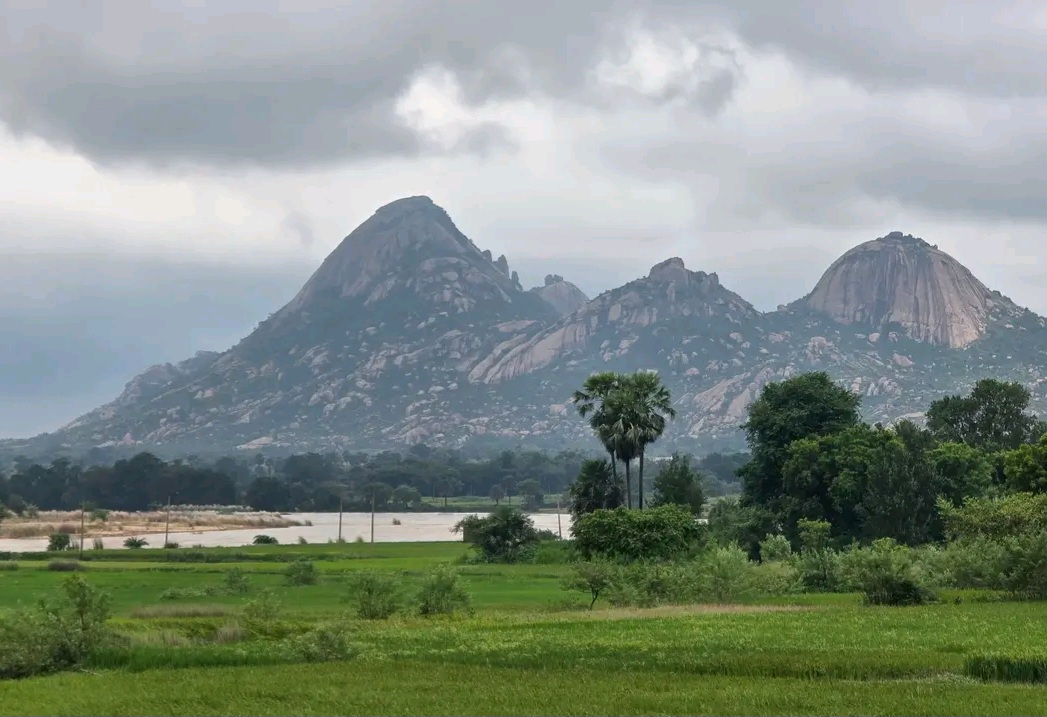
- Patharda Hill in Sarath CD block

- Coordinates: 24°14′12″N 86°50′16″E
- Country: India
- State: Jharkhand
- District: Deoghar

Government
  - Type: Federal democracy

Area
  - Total: 318.45 km^{2} (122.95 sq mi)
- Elevation: 208 m (682 ft)

Population (2011)
  - Total: 169,238
  - Density: 531.44/km^{2} (1,376.4/sq mi)

Languages
  - Official: Khortha, Hindi

Literacy (2011)
  - Total literates: 87,236 (62.63%)
- Time zone: UTC+5:30 (IST)
- PIN: 814149 (Sarath)
- Telephone/STD code: 06438
- Vehicle registration: JH-15
- Lok Sabha constituency: Dumka
- Vidhan Sabha constituency: Sarath
- MLA: Uday Shankar Singh (JMM)
- Website: deoghar.nic.in

Sarath is a community development block that forms an administrative division in the Madhupur subdivision of the Deoghar district, Jharkhand state, India.

== Geography ==
Sarath, the eponymous CD Block headquarters, is located at 24°14′12″N 86°50′16″E.

It is located 37 km from Deoghar, the district headquarters.

Deoghar district, a plateau region, is broadly divided into two sub-micro regions – the Dumka-Godda Uplands and Deoghar Uplands. The Dumka-Godda Uplands covers the north-eastern portion of the district. It has an elevation of 753 metres (2,470 ft) above mean sea level. The Deoghar Uplands covers the south-western portion of the district.

The district has some isolated peaks, including Phuljori (2,312 ft), 18 miles from Madhupur, Degaria (1,716 ft), 3 miles from Baidyanath Junction, Patharda (1,603 ft), 8 miles from Madhupur, and Tirkut Parvat (2,470 ft), 10 miles from Deoghar on the Dumka-Deoghar Road.

Sarath CD block is bounded by Devipur, Sarwan and Sonaraithari CD blocks on the north, Palojori CD block on the east, Karmatanr CD block in Jamtara district on the south, and Karon and Madhupur CD blocks on the west.

Sarath CD block has an area of 318.45 km^{2}.Sarath and Chitra police stations serve this block. Headquarters of this CD block is at Sarath village.

Gram panchayats in Sarath CD block are: Aluwara, Arajori, Asanbani, Bagdabra. Barbad, Basahatand, Bhabhangama, Bochbandh, Chitra, Dindakoli, Dumdumi, Fulchua, Jamuasol, Jhiluwa, Karobank, Kechuwabank, Kukraha, Lagwan, Manjhladih, Nawada, Palma, Pathardda, Vidyasagar, Munda, Sabejore, Sagharia, Sarath, Simla and Thadih.

== Demographics ==
=== Population ===
As per the 2011 Census of India Sarath CD block had a total population of 169,238, all of which were rural. There were 87,698 (52%) males and 81,540 (48%) females. Population below 6 years was 29,953. Scheduled Castes numbered 25,366 (14.99%) and Scheduled Tribes numbered 23,186 (13.70%).

=== Literacy ===
As of 2011 census, the total number of literates in Sarath CD Block was 87,236 (62.63% of the population over 6 years) out of which 54,817 (63%) were males and 32,419 (37%) were females. The gender disparity (the difference between female and male literacy rates) was 26%.

See also – List of Jharkhand districts ranked by literacy rate

Literacy in CD Blocks of
Deoghar district
Deoghar – 63.24%
Mohanpur – 58.66%
Sarwan – 63.39%
Sonaraithari – 58.03%
Devipur – 59.43%
Madhupur – 59.57%
Margomunda – 58.46%
Karon – 59.61%
Sarath – 62.63%
Palojori – 60.27%
Source: 2011 Census: CD Block Wise
Primary Census Abstract Data

=== Language and religion ===
Religions in Sarath block (2011)
Religion	Percent
Hinduism	83.83%
Islam	14.20%
Sarna	1.48%
Other or not stated	0.49%

Languages of Sarath block (2011)
1. Khortha (78.5%)
2. Santali (11.7%)
3. Hindi (4.22%)
4. Bengali (3.04%)
5. Urdu (1.54%)
6. Others (1.04%)

At the time of the 2011 census, 78.45% of the population spoke Khortha, 11.71% Santali, 4.22% Hindi, 3.04% Bengali and 1.54% Urdu as their first language.

== Rural poverty ==
50-60% of the population of Deoghar district were in the BPL category in 2004–2005, being in the same category as Pakur, Sahebganj and Garhwa districts. Rural poverty in Jharkhand declined from 66% in 1993–94 to 46% in 2004–05. In 2011, it has come down to 39.1%.

== Economy ==
=== Livelihood ===
Livelihood
in Sarath CD block
1. Cultivators (27.7%)
2. Agricultural labourers (50.8%)
3. Household industries (4.63%)
4. Other Workers (16.9%)

In Sarath CD block in 2011, amongst the class of total workers, cultivators numbered 18,133 and formed 27.66%, agricultural labourers numbered 33,308 and formed 50.81%, household industry workers numbered 3,037 and formed 4.63% and other workers numbered 11,079 and formed 16.90%. Total workers numbered 65,557 and formed 38.74% of the total population. Non-workers numbered 103,681 and formed 61.26% of total population.

Note: In the census records a person is considered a cultivator, if the person is engaged in cultivation/ supervision of land owned. When a person who works on another person's land for wages in cash or kind or share, is regarded as an agricultural labourer. Household industry is defined as an industry conducted by one or more members of the family within the household or village, and one that does not qualify for registration as a factory under the Factories Act. Other workers are persons engaged in some economic activity other than cultivators, agricultural labourers and household workers. It includes factory, mining, plantation, transport and office workers, those engaged in business and commerce, teachers and entertainment artistes.

=== Infrastructure ===
There are 349 inhabited villages in Sarath CD block. In 2011, 309 villages had power supply. 6 villages had tap water (treated/ untreated), 318 villages had well water (covered/ uncovered), 318 villages had hand pumps, and 23 villages had no drinking water facility. 31 villages had post offices, 19 villages had sub post offices, 21 villages had telephones (land lines), 16 villages had public call offices and 162 villages had mobile phone coverage. 12 villages had bank branches, 337 villages had ATMs, 4 villages had agricultural credit societies, 12 village had cinema/ video hall, 14 villages had public library and public reading room. 83 villages had public distribution system, 26 villages had weekly haat (market) and 138 villages had assembly polling stations.

=== Agriculture ===
The agricultural sector absorbs around two-thirds of the workforce in the district. In Sarath CD block, the cultivable area formed 48.86% of the total area, and the irrigated area formed 10.73% of the cultivable area.

Jungles in the plain areas have almost been cleared and even hills are becoming naked in an area once known for its extensive forests.

=== Backward Regions Grant Fund ===
Deoghar district is listed as a backward region and receives financial support from the Backward Regions Grant Fund. The fund created by the Government of India is designed to redress regional imbalances in development. As of 2012, 272 districts across the country were listed under this scheme. The list includes 21 districts of Jharkhand.

== Education ==
Sarath CD block had 47 villages with pre-primary schools, 234 villages with primary schools, 85 villages with middle schools, 5 villages with secondary schools, 3 villages with senior secondary schools, 1 special school for disabled, 110 villages with no educational facility.
.*Senior secondary schools are also known as Inter colleges in Jharkhand

== Healthcare ==
Sarath CD block had 2 villages with primary health centres, 18 villages with primary health subcentres, 2 villages with allopathic hospitals, 3 village with dispensary, 44 villages with medicine shops.
.*Private medical practitioners, alternative medicine etc. not included
