= Kawakole =

- Village
- Location in Bihar, India
- Coordinates: 24.88°N 85.53°E
- Country: India
- State: Bihar
- District: Nawada
- Elevation: 93 m (305 ft)

Population (2011)
  - Total: 12,198

Languages
  - Official: Magahi, Hindi
- Time zone: UTC+5:30 (IST)
- PIN: 805106

Kawakole is a small town and a Block in Nawada district in the Indian state of Bihar. It is situated about 40 km from Nawada City. The Block lies in the eastern side of Nawada district and is close to Jamui district and Giridih district of Jharkhand. The primary occupation of Kawakol's residents is agriculture, and this area is well known for its tourist attractions.

== History ==
Kawakole was the Workplace of Loknayak Jai Prakash Narayan. He spent a large part of his life there.

Bihar archaeologist team found Remains of Paal dynasty in DevenGadh

== Demographics ==
In the mid-19th century, many labourers from this region migrated to Mauritius, Reunion Island and various Caribbean islands. The present population 12,198 . Males constitute 6275 of the population and females constitute 5923. Kawakole has an average literacy rate of 56.95%, lower than the state average of 61.80%. Male literacy is 65.65%, and female literacy is 47.81%.

== Languages ==
Magahi is the most commonly spoken language in Kawakole.

== Communities ==
Modis, Sunars, Telis, Tamolis, Brahmins, Kushwahas, kahars, Mahuris, Musahars, Chamars, Doms, Yadavs, and Muslims are among the major communities that make up the population of the Kawakole area. The Urdu-speaking Muslim community represents a large section of the people particularly in the Kawakole Block. During British rule a large area of land was owned and cultivated by Muslims. After the partition of India, the majority of Muslim landlords emigrated to Pakistan. Others emigrated to Gaya, Patna, Delhi and Kolkata.

== Commerce ==
The main market of Kawakole is at Bazaar Thana Road. Kawakole's economy is primarily dependent on agriculture. There are three fuel stations and one Domestic Gas Agency in the area. Thana Road area & Ranibazar are an emerging commercial hub.

== Industry ==
Although most industries in Kawakole are small-scale, family-owned businesses, Kawakole is one of the fastest-growing places in the district of Nawada..

== Banks ==
- State Bank of India (Customer Service Point)
- Punjab National Bank (branch and ATM)
- Magadh Gramin Bank
- Co-operative Bank
- LIC (branch)
- SAHARA India (branch)

== Cuisine ==
Kawakole's most popular foods include sangamm, raskadam, anarsa, laai, launglata, jalewi, tilkut, khaaza, gulab jamun and chaat.

== Education ==
=== Government schools & Prominent education institutes ===
- Inter School Kawakole
- Girls Middle School
- Middle School, kawakol
- Project Inter Girls School Joravardih, kawakol
- Saraswati Shishu / Vidya Mandir
- Jeevan Jyoti Public School, kawakol
- TSM Avasiya Vikas Vidyalaya, kawakol
- DRPS School, kawakol
- Ambedkar public school, kawakol
- Jesus Jeevan Dhara Bijho, kawakol
- Gyanoday vikas vidyalaya Ranibazar, Kawakol
- An-Noor English School, Kawakol
- Warsi Degree College, Pandey Gangaut

== Tourist attraction ==
- Sarvodya ashram sokhodewra, kawakol
- J.P mountain
- Machandra waterfall
- Bolta pahad
- Mahavir Janmasthan lachuaar

== Railway station ==
- Nawada railway station is nearest Railway station. Also Jamui Railway Station is nearby Railway Station, but little far from Nawada.

== Cinema halls ==
- Jyoti Picture Palace
