= Kasturba Gandhi Balika Vidyalaya =

Indian school scheme for girls in disadvantaged groups

- Country: India
- Ministry: Government of India
- Launched: July 2004

The Kasturba Gandhi Balika Vidyalaya or KGBV is a residential girls’ secondary school run by the Government of India for the weaker sections in India.

== History ==
The plan was introduced by the Government of India in August 2004. It was then integrated into the Sarva Shiksha Abhiyan program, to provide educational facilities for girls belonging to Scheduled Castes, Scheduled Tribes, Other Backward Classes, minority communities and families below the poverty line in Educationally Backward Blocks.

== Objective ==
Gender disparities still persist in rural areas and among disadvantaged communities. Looking at enrolment trends, there remain significant gaps in the enrollment of girls at the elementary level as compared to boys, especially at the upper primary levels. The objective of KGBV is to ensure that quality education is feasible and accessible to the girls of disadvantaged groups of society by setting up residential schools with boarding facilities at elementary level.

== Eligibility ==
The scheme was applicable since its inception in 2004, in Educationally Backward Blocks (EBBs) where the rural female literacy is below the national average (46.13%: Census 2001) and the gender gap in literacy is more than the national average (21.59%: Census 2001). Among these blocks, schools may be set up in areas with:

1. concentration of tribal population, with low female literacy and/or many girls out of school
2. concentration of SC, ST, OBC and minority populations, with low female literacy and/or many girls out of school
3. areas with low female literacy
4. areas with many small, scattered habitations that do not qualify for a school

The criteria of eligible blocks has been revised with effect from 1 April 2008 to include the following:

- An additional 316 Educationally backward blocks with rural female literacy below 30%.
- 94 Towns/cities having minority concentration (as per the list identified by Ministry of Minority Affairs) with female literacy rate below the national average (53.67%: Census 2001).

== Coverage ==
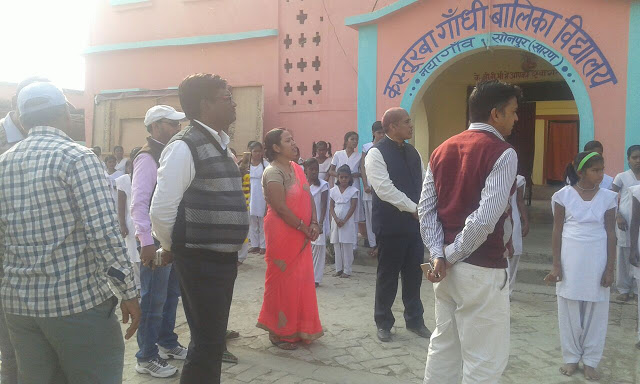
Kasturba Gandhi Balika Vidyalaya, Nayagaon, Bihar, sonpur

The scheme has been implemented in 28 states and union territories:

Assam, Andhra Pradesh, Telangana, Arunachal Pradesh, Bihar, Chhattisgarh, Dadra and Nagar Haveli, Delhi, Gujarat, Haryana, Himachal Pradesh, Jammu and Kashmir, Jharkhand, Karnataka, Madhya Pradesh, Maharashtra, Manipur, Meghalaya, Mizoram, Nagaland, Odisha, Punjab, Rajasthan, Tamil Nadu, Tripura, Uttar Pradesh, Uttarakhand and West Bengal.

2,578 KGBVs were sanctioned by the Government of India. Of these, 427 KGBVs have been sanctioned in Muslim concentration blocks, 612 in ST blocks, 688 in SC blocks. A total of 750 residential schools have been opened in educational backward blocks. 75% enrollment is reserved for girls from SC, ST, OBC and Minority communities and the other 25% to girls from families below the poverty line.
