= Administrative divisions of Jharkhand =

Regional divisions in Jharkhand

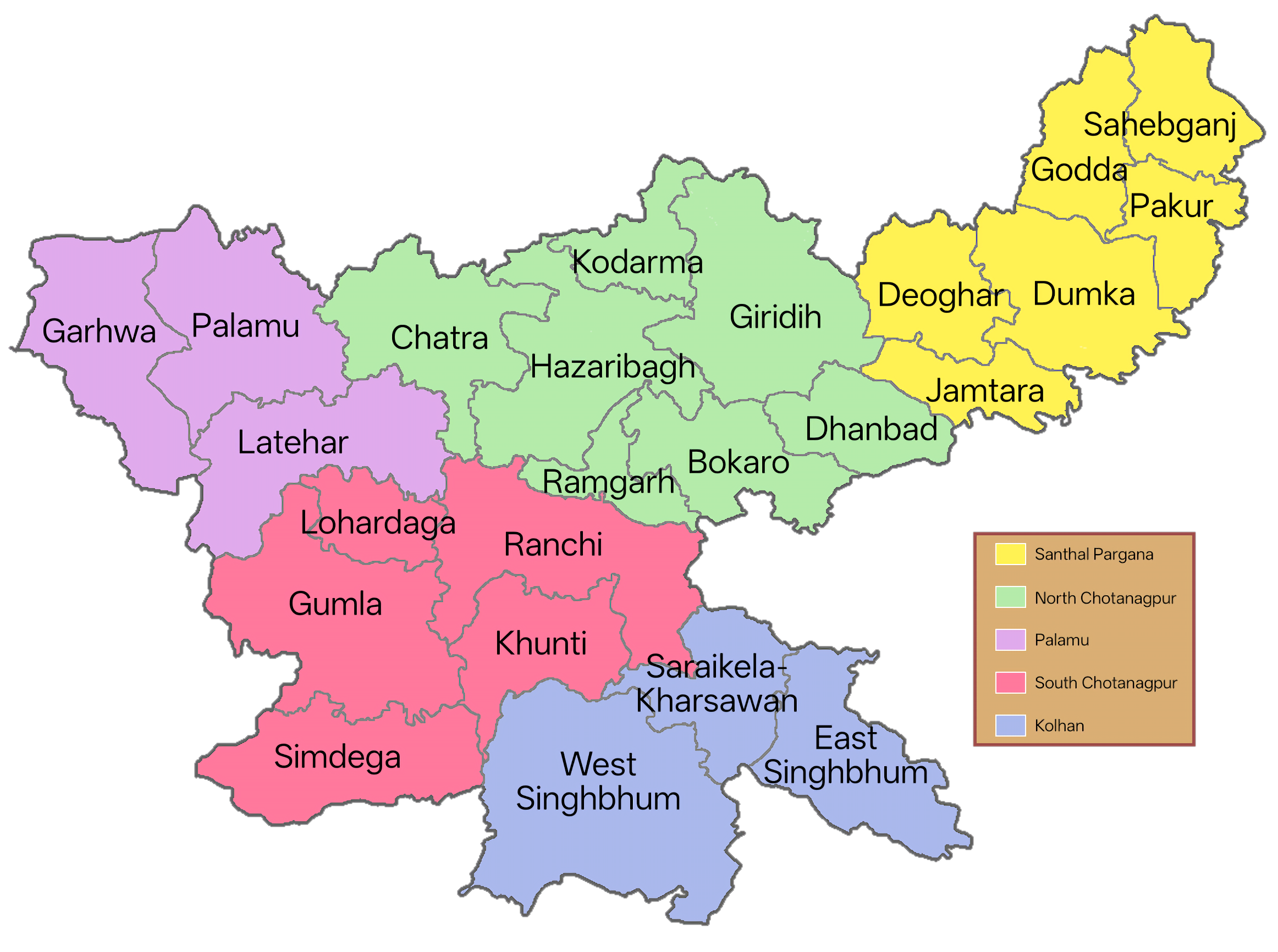
- Administrative divisions of Jharkhand
- Category: Administrative division
- Location: Jharkhand
- Number: 5 divisions
- Populations: Palamu – 3,989,631 (lowest); North Chotanagpur – 11,635,374 (highest)
- Areas: Santhal Pargana – 12,601 km^{2} (4,865 sq mi) (smallest); North Chotanagpur – 21,039 km^{2} (8,123 sq mi) (largest)
- Government: Government of Jharkhand
- Subdivisions: Districts of Jharkhand

Jharkhand is divided into five Administrative divisions namely South Chotanagpur, North Chotanagpur, Kolhan, Palamu and Santhal Pargana.

== Background ==
Jharkhand state was created as 28th state of India by the Bihar Re-organization Act on 15 November 2000. State was created due to its underdevelopment and social justice. Jharkhand has 5 neighborhood states e.g. Bihar on the North, Orissa on the South, Chhattisgarh and Uttar Pradesh on the west West Bengal on the East.

== Administration ==
Jharkhand state is subdivided into divisions, which have official administrative governmental status, and each division is headed by Divisional commissioner who is a senior IAS officer.

== List of divisions ==
Division	Headquarters	Districts	Area (km²)	Population (2011)	Map
Palamu	Medininagar	Garhwa; Latehar; Palamu	12,777	3,989,631	
North Chotanagpur	Hazaribagh	Bokaro; Chatra; Dhanbad; Giridih; Hazaribagh; Koderma; Ramgarh	21,039	11,635,374	
Santhal Pargana	Dumka	Godda; Deoghar; Dumka; Jamtara; Sahibganj; Pakur	12,601	6,969,097	
South Chotanagpur	Ranchi	Gumla; Khunti; Lohardaga; Ranchi; Simdega	18,235	5,532,719	
Kolhan	Chaibasa	East Singhbhum; Seraikela Kharsawan; West Singhbhum	13,443	4,861,313	

== See also ==
- Districts of Jharkhand
- Subdivisions of Jharkhand
