= Kolhan =

Kolhan may refer to:

- Kolhan (village), a settlement in Maharashtra, India
- Kolhan division, a division in Jharkhand, India
- Kolhan University, an educational institution in Chaibasa, Jharkhand, India
