= Kolhan division =

Administrative division of Jharkhand, India

Coordinates: 22.6°N 85.8°E

- Division of Jharkhand
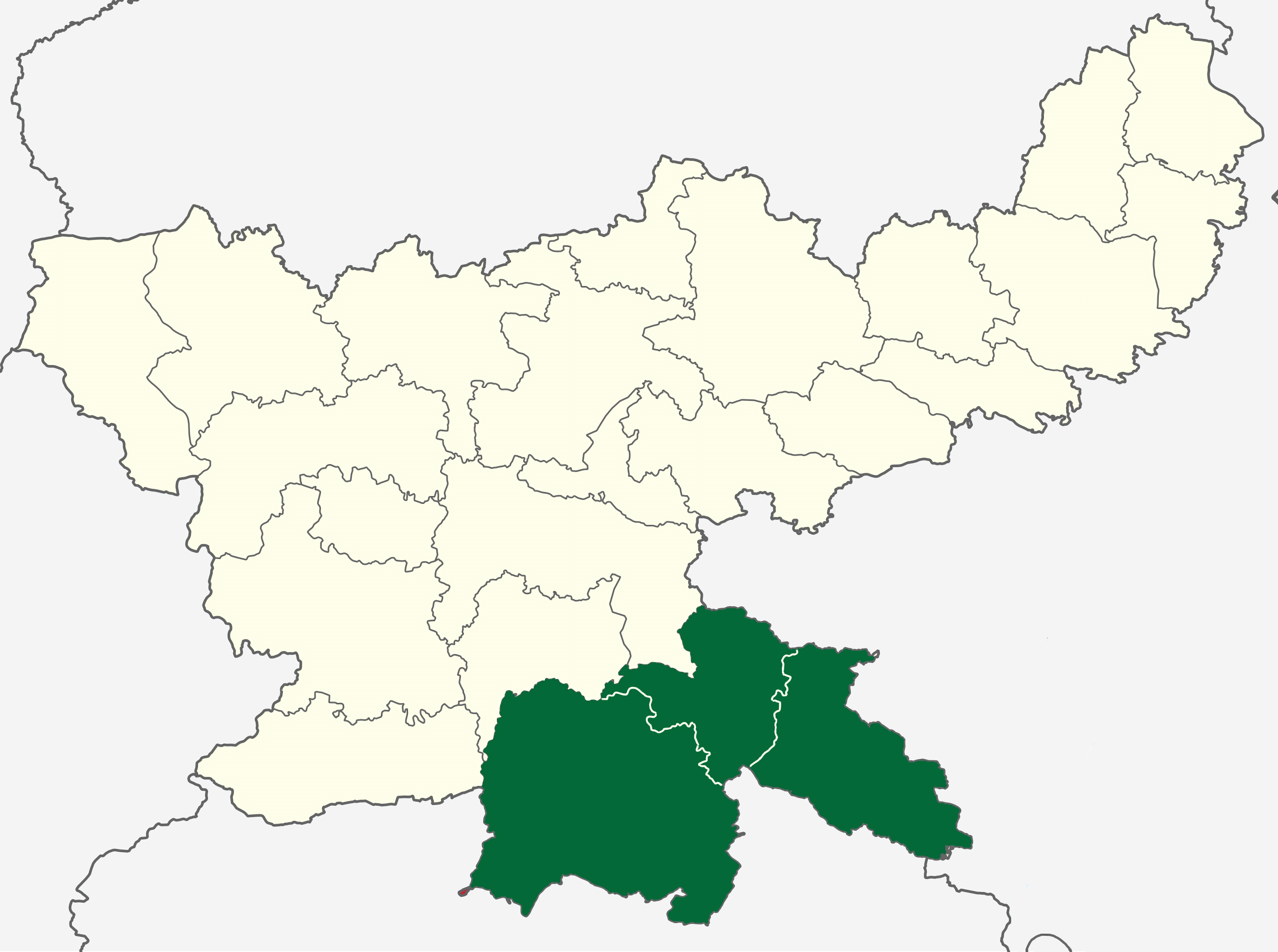
- Location of Kolhan Division in Jharkhand
- Country: India
- State: Jharkhand
- Established: 2003
- Headquarters: Chaibasa
- Districts: Seraikela Kharsawan, East Singhbhum, West Singhbhum

Government
  - Commissioner: Shri Ravi Ranjan Kumar Vikram (IAS)
  - DIG: Shri Anuranjan Kispotta (IPS)

Area
  - Total: 13,443 km^{2} (5,190 sq mi)

Population (2011)
  - Total: 4,861,313
  - Density: 361.62/km^{2} (936.60/sq mi)

Kolhan division is one of the five divisions in the Indian state of Jharkhand. The division comprises three districts: East Singhbhum, Seraikela Kharsawan district, and West Singhbhum. The three districts were earlier a part of South Chotanagpur division.

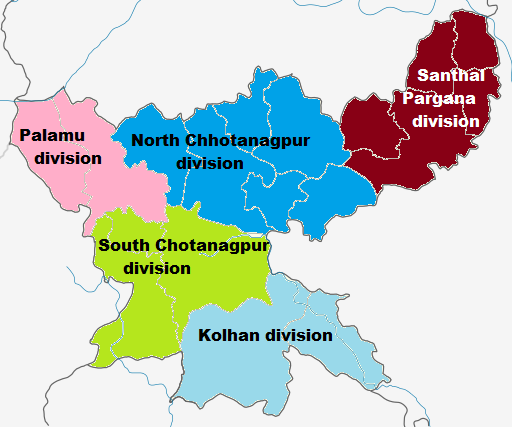
Map of Kolhan division (in light blue) in Southern Jharkhand

== History ==
The administrative history of the Kolhan division dates back to 1837, when Captain Thomas Wilkinson of the British administration promulgated the Kolhan Government Estate following the Kol uprising of 1831–33. The name Kolhan is derived from Kol—a colonial exonym used for tribal communities—and han, meaning “people” or “human” in the Ho language. The estate was established to bring the Ho-concentrated regions (formerly referred to as Kol) under direct and exclusive colonial governance. Over time, it formed the basis of the Singhbhum district through the amalgamation of neighbouring tribal regions to its east. After India’s independence, the area was reorganized for administrative convenience. With the formation of the state of Jharkhand in 2000, the region composing West Singhbhum, Saraikela Kharsawan and East Singhbhum was constituted as a separate administrative division named Kolhan Division.

== Demographics ==
Historical population

Year	Pop.	±%
1901	909,655	—
1911	1,015,656	+11.7%
1921	1,074,254	+5.8%
1931	1,312,630	+22.2%
1941	1,565,306	+19.2%
1951	1,700,590	+8.6%

Year	Pop.	±%
1961	2,049,911	+20.5%
1971	2,437,799	+18.9%
1981	2,861,799	+17.4%
1991	3,401,043	+18.8%
2001	4,065,783	+19.5%
2011	4,861,313	+19.6%

Source: Census of India

=== Languages ===
Languages in Kolhan division (2011)
1. Bengali (26.4%)
2. Ho (20.2%)
3. Hindi (10.9%)
4. Santali (10.6%)
5. Odia (10.4%)
6. Mundari (5.21%)
7. Urdu (4.66%)
8. Bhojpuri (3.43%)
9. Kurmali (1.44%)
10. Magahi (1.03%)
11. Other (5.71%)
