= North Chotanagpur division =

Administrative division of Jharkhand, India

Coordinates: 24.023°N 85.397°E

- Division of Jharkhand
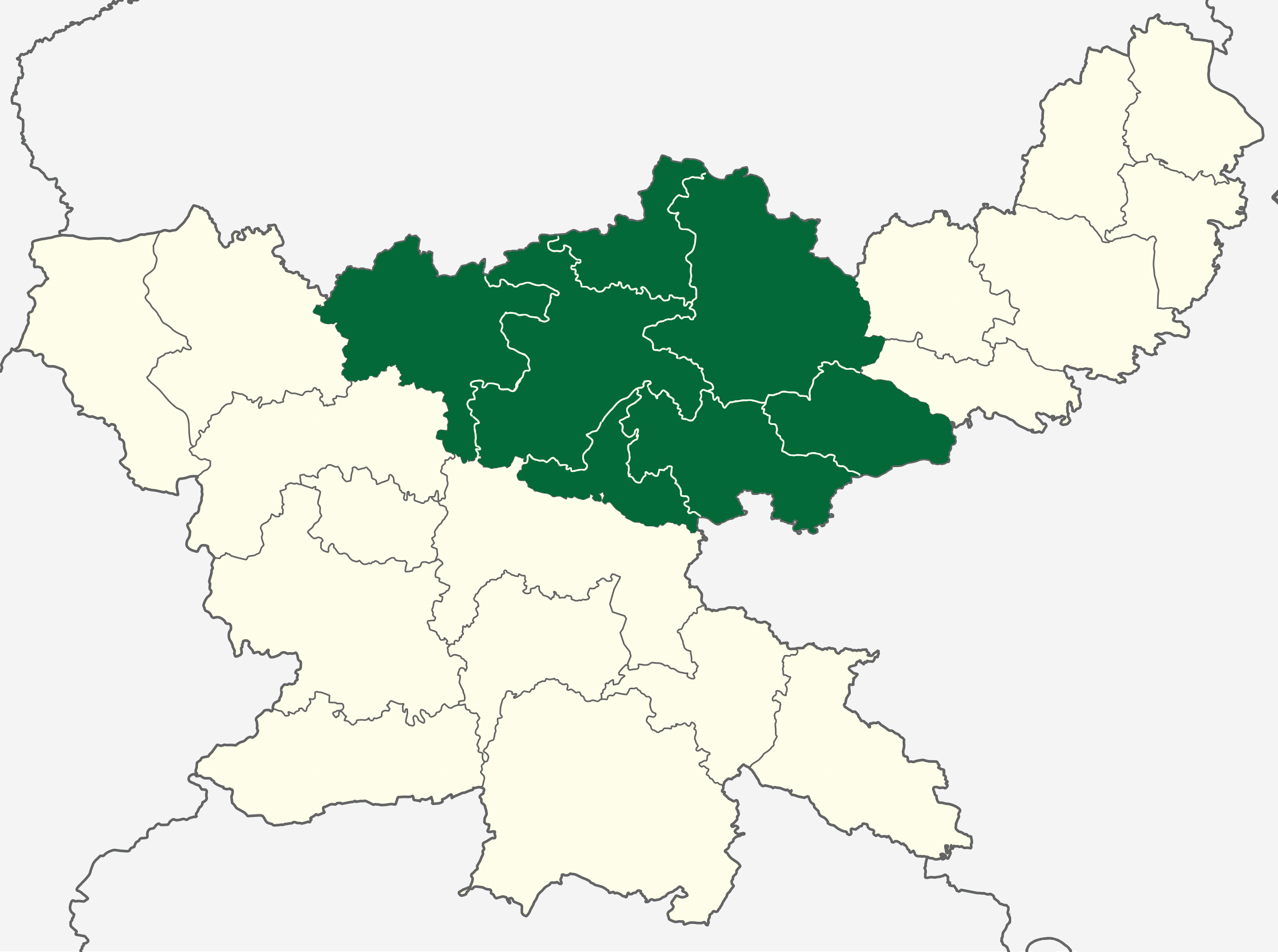
- Location of North Chotanagpur division in Jharkhand
- Country: India
- State: Jharkhand
- Headquarters: Hazaribagh
- Districts: Hazaribagh, Koderma, Bokaro, Dhanbad, Chatra, Giridih, Ramgarh

Government
  - Commissioner: Shri Vijay Kumar Gupta (IAS)
  - Inspector General of Police: Shri Shailendra Kr. Sinha (IPS)

Area
  - Total: 21,039 km^{2} (8,123 sq mi)

Population (2011)
  - Total: 11,635,374

North Chotanagpur division is one of the five divisions of the Indian state of Jharkhand. The division comprises the following districts: Bokaro, Chatra, Dhanbad, Giridih, Hazaribagh, Koderma and Ramgarh. It was earlier part of the Chota Nagpur Division.

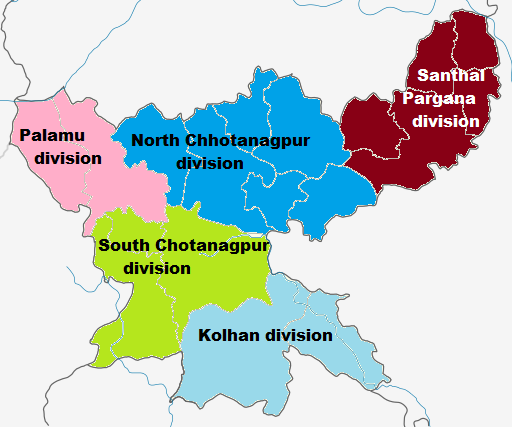
Map of North Chotanagpur division, in blue

Languages in North Chotanagpur division (2011)
1. Khortha (48.9%)
2. Hindi (22.6%)
3. Urdu (6.85%)
4. Bengali (6.26%)
5. Santali (5.95%)
6. Magahi (3.42%)
7. Bhojpuri (2.38%)
8. Others (3.63%)
