= Deoghar district =

Deoghar District Dēvghar Jilā
- District of Jharkhand
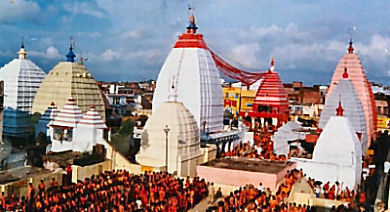
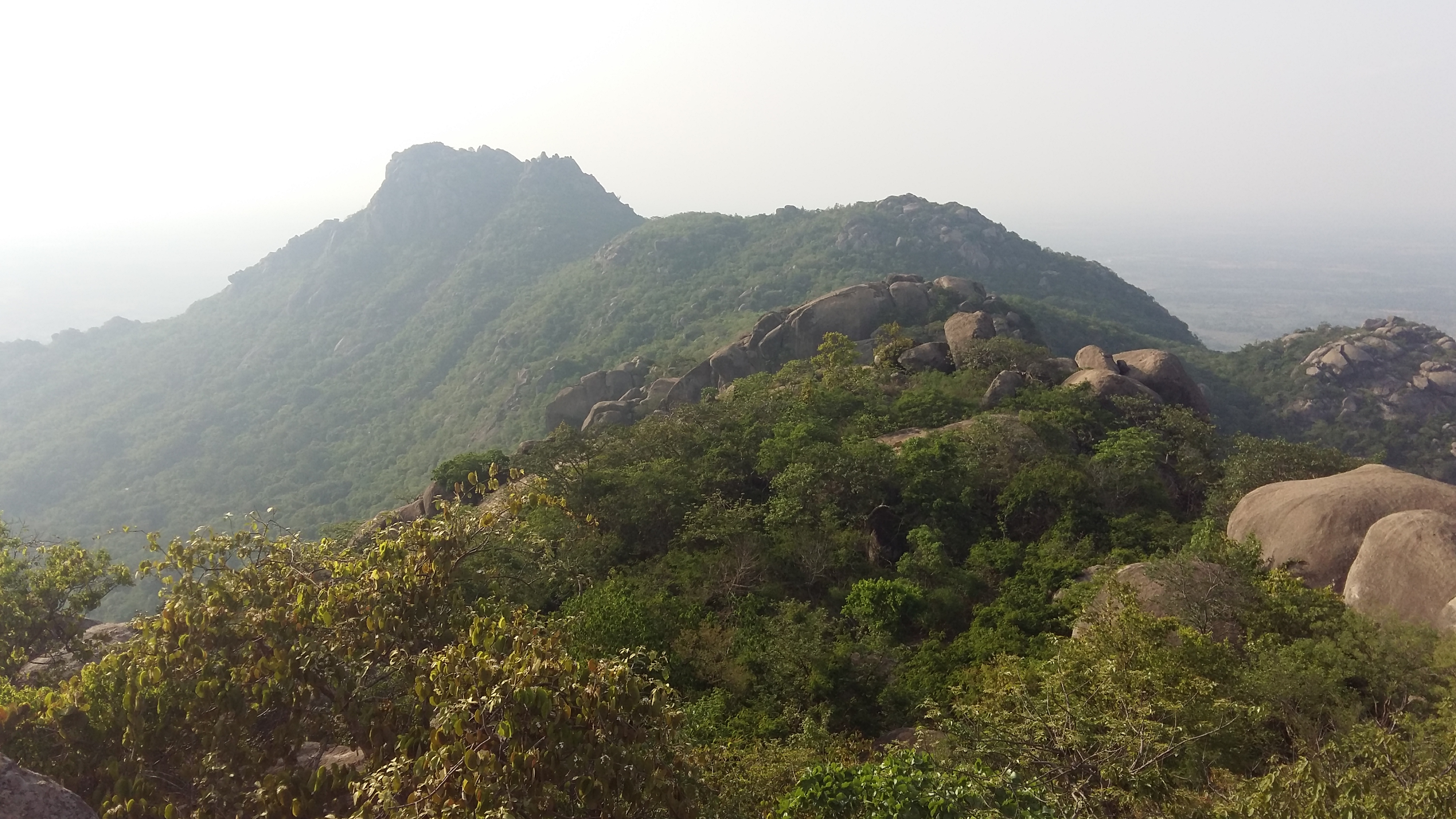
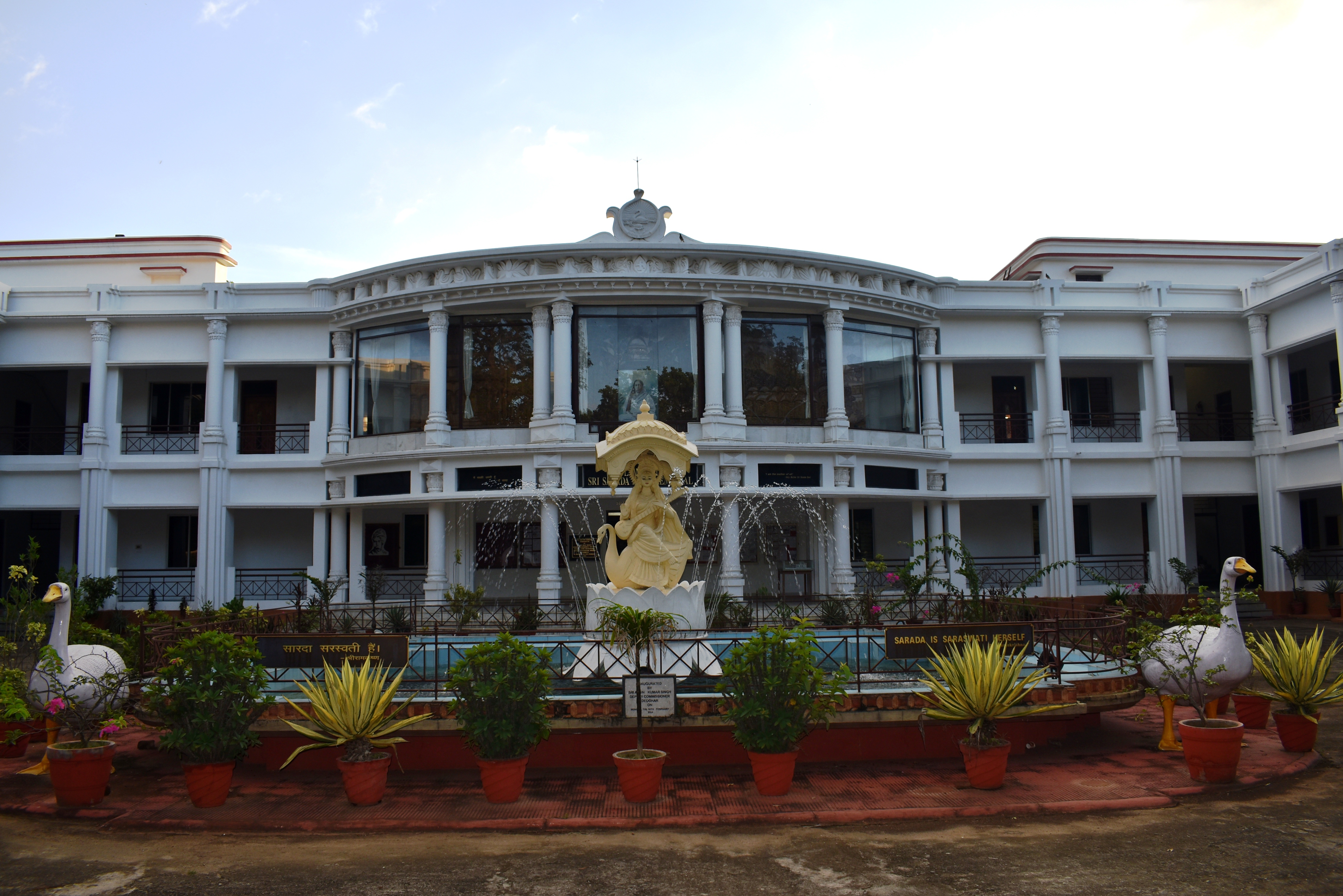
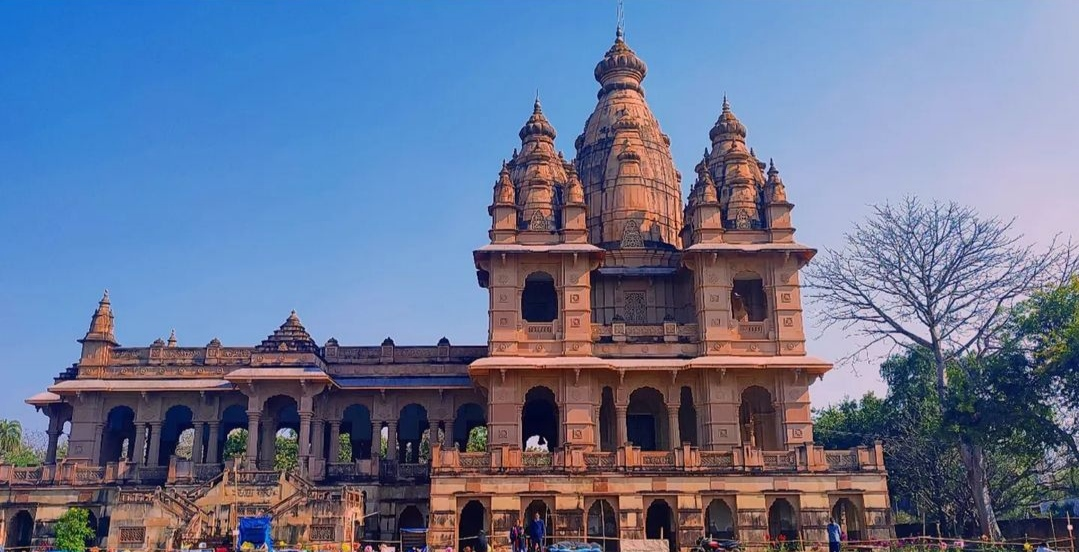
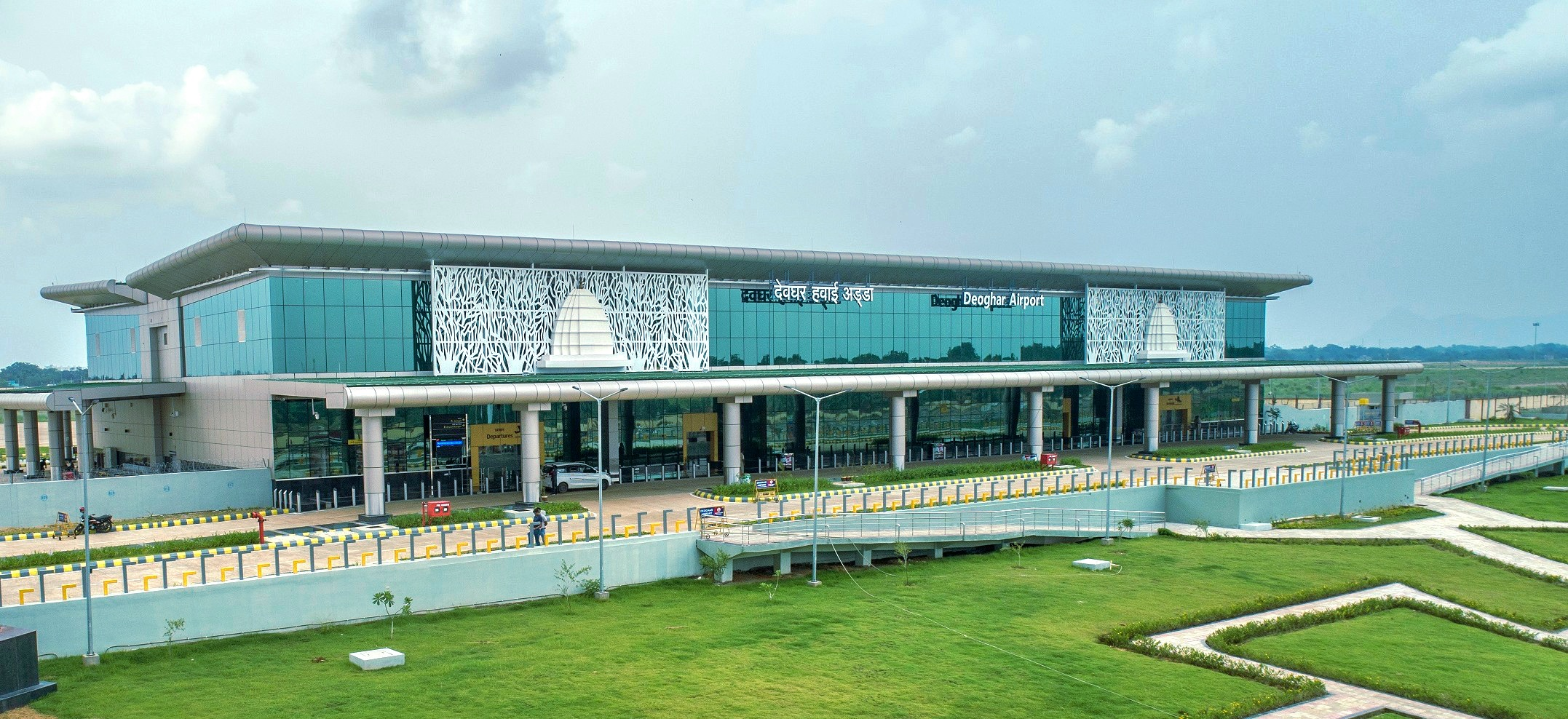
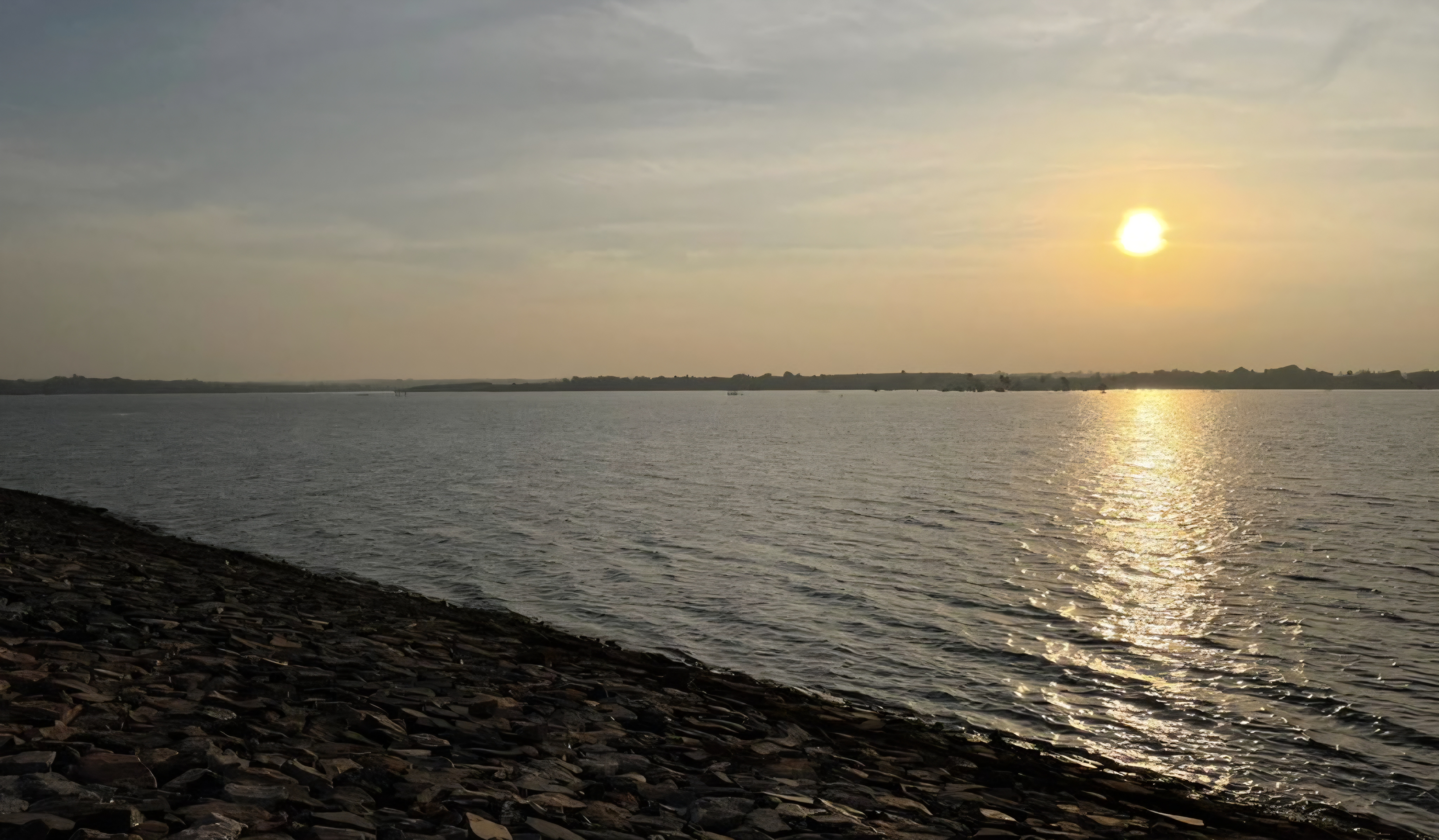
- From top, left to right: Baidyanath Temple, Trikut Hill, Ramakrishna Mission Vidyapith, Deoghar, Naulakha Temple, Deoghar Airport, Punasi Dam
- Interactive map of Deoghar District
- Coordinates: 24°29′N 86°42′E
- Country: India
- State: Jharkhand
- Division: Santhal Pargana
- Established: 15 November 2000
- Headquarters: Deoghar

Government
  - Deputy Commissioner: Saurabh Kumar Bhuwania, (IAS)
  - Subdivisions: Deoghar, Madhupur
  - CD Blocks: Deoghar, Devipur, Mohanpur, Sarwan, Sonaraithari, Madhupur, Sarath, Palojori, Karon, Margomunda
  - Lok Sabha constituencies: 1.Dumka (shared with Dumka district) 2.Godda (shared with Godda district)
  - Vidhan Sabha constituencies: 1.Deoghar 2.Madhupur 3.Sarath

Area
  - Total: 2,478.61 km^{2} (957.00 sq mi)
  - Rank: 16th

Population (2011)
  - Total: 1,492,073
  - Rank: 9th
  - Density: 601.980/km^{2} (1,559.12/sq mi)
  - Rank: 5th
  - Urban: 258,361

Languages
  - Official: Hindi
  - Regional: Maithili (Deogharia)

Demographics
  - Literacy: 64.85%
  - Sex ratio: 925
- Time zone: UTC+05:30 (IST)
- Vehicle registration: JH-15
- HSAC: DE
- Major highways: NH 114A NH 333 NH 133
- Domestic Airport: Deoghar Airport
- Website: https://deoghar.nic.in

Deoghar district (pronounced, Devo ka ghar) is one of the twenty-four districts of Jharkhand state in eastern India. Deoghar, the central city of the district, is also its administrative headquarters. This district is known for the Baidyanath Jyotirlinga shrine and is a part of the Santhal Pargana division. Deoghar is a Hindi word meaning abode ('ghar') of the Gods and Goddesses ('dev'). Deoghar is also known as "Baidyanath Dham", and "Baba Dham",.

== History ==
The district was formed on 1 June 1981 by separating it from the former Santhal Pargana district.

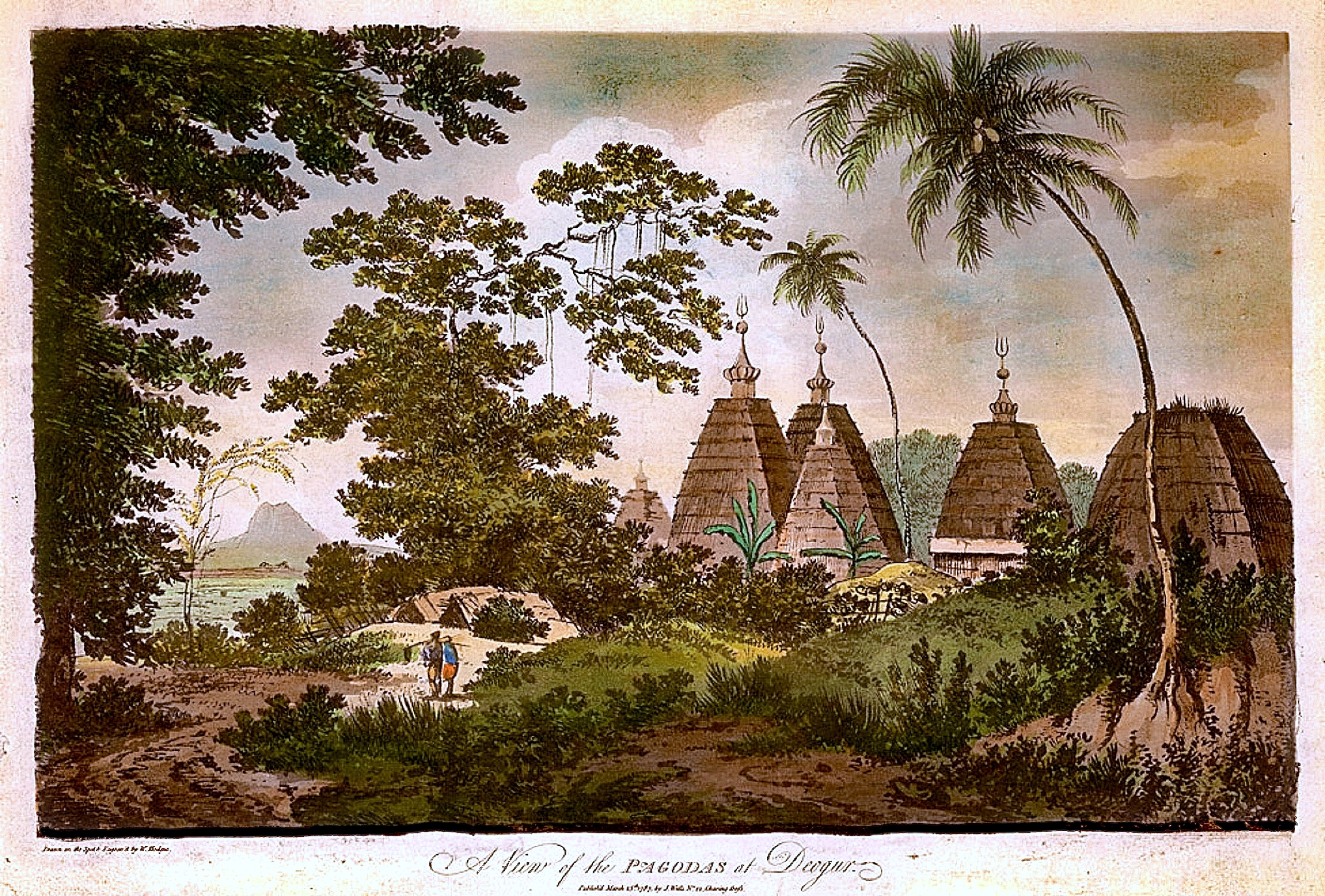
A View of the Pagodas at Deoghar

== Geography ==
The Deoghar district is located in western portion of Santhal Parganas. It shares its boundary with Banka and Jamui districts in the north, Dumka district in the east, Jamtara district in the south, and Giridih district in the west. The district extends from 24.0.03' N to 23.0.38' N and from 86.0.28' E to 87.0.04' E; it has an area of 2481 km^{2}. It had a population of 1,491,879 people according to the 2011 Census of India.

The district contains several clusters of rocky hills covered by forest with a series of long ridges with intervening depressions. Most of the rolling highlands are cultivated by highland crops. The average elevation of the district is 247 m above mean sea level. There are some hill ranges like Phuljari (750 m), Teror (670 m), and Degaria (575 m). The general slope of the district descends to the southeast. Geologically, the district is mainly covered by Chhota Nagpur granite gneiss of Archean age with patches of alluvium, sandstone, and shale of Gondwana formations. Important rivers flowing in the district include the Ajay and the Paltro. These rivers gather a large number of tributaries that form the landscape full of Tanrs and Dons.

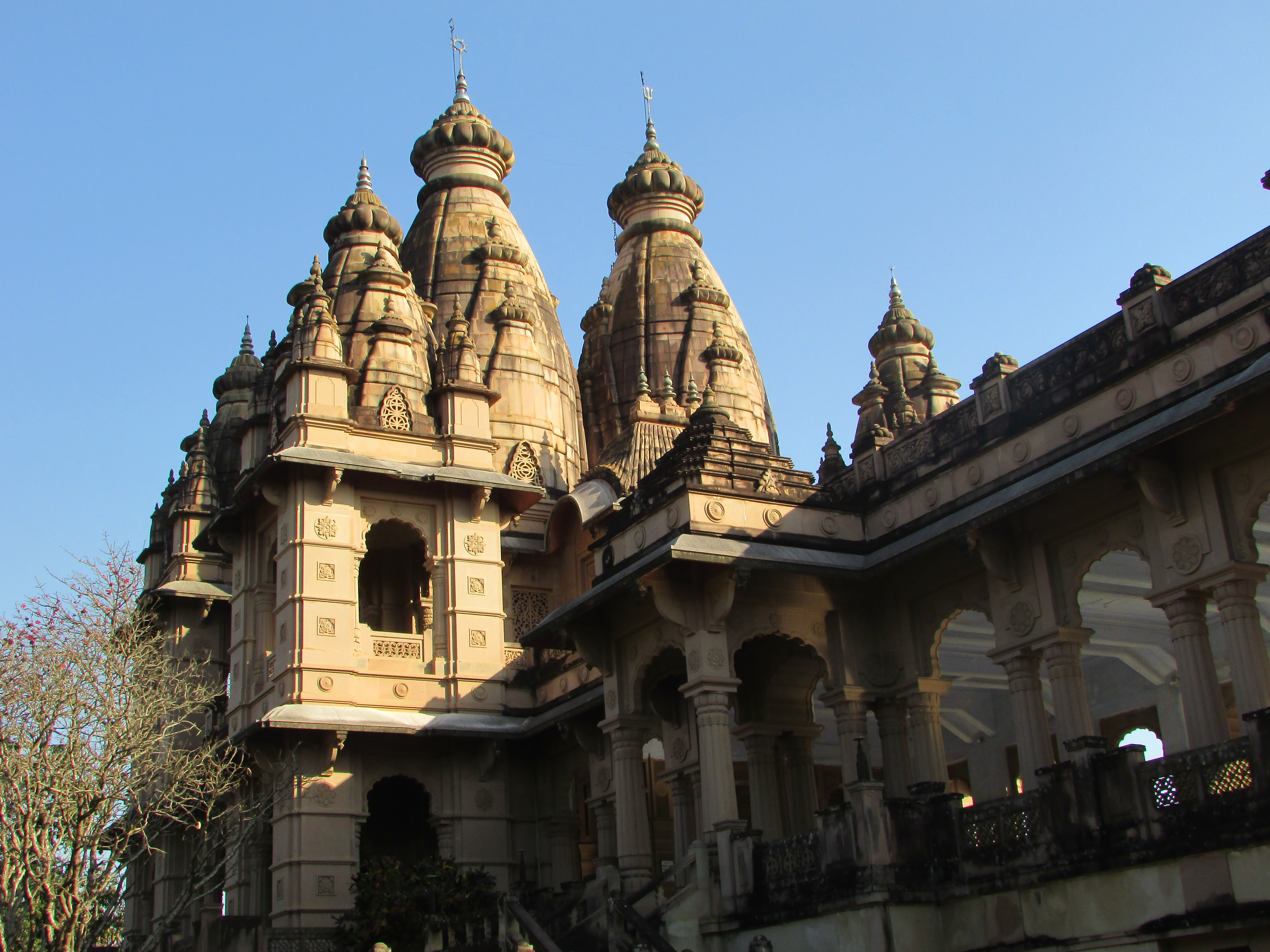
Naulakha Temple

=== Cities and villages ===
Madhupur, Chitra, Sarsa Kushmaha, Majhiyana, Singhjori, Tharidulampur, Jamua, Charakmara, Palojori, Devipur, Sarwan, Sarath, Karon, Mohanpur, Rohni, Babangaua, Ghorlash, Jasidih, Koridih, Raihdih, Gidhaiya, Kalyanpur, Jitjori, Bhojpur, Sirsa, Mahapur, Bandajori, Manigarhi, Balidih, Sonaraithari, Dondiya, Sadhariya, Nawadih, Sabaijore, Goremara

=== Climate ===
The district experiences hot summers which usually last from March to May. Heavy monsoon rains occur from June to September. Winters are cool, dry and generally last from October to February. The average annual rainfall is 1239 mm, mean summer maximum temperature is 43 °C, and the mean winter minimum temperature is 8 °C.

It is one of the 21 districts in Jharkhand currently receiving funds from the Backward Regions Grant Fund Programme (BRGF).

== Politics ==
District	No.	Constituency	Name	Party	Alliance	Remarks	Deoghar	13	Madhupur	Hafizul Hasan	JMM	MGB	Cabinet minister
14	Sarath	Uday Shankar Singh					Deoghar				JMM	MGB	
15	Deoghar	Suresh Paswan		RJD			Deoghar					MGB	

== Subdivisions and Blocks ==
The district is composed of two subdivisions: Deoghar and Madhupur.

The district comprises ten blocks: Deoghar, Karon, Madhupur, Mohanpur, Palojori, Sarath, Devipur, Margomunda, Sarwan, and Sonaraithari.

There are 3 Vidhan Sabha (Legislative Assembly) constituencies in this district: Madhupur, Sarath, and Deoghar. Madhupur and Deoghar are part of the Godda Lok Sabha constituency, while Sarath is part of Dumka Lok Sabha constituency.

== Administration and local governance ==
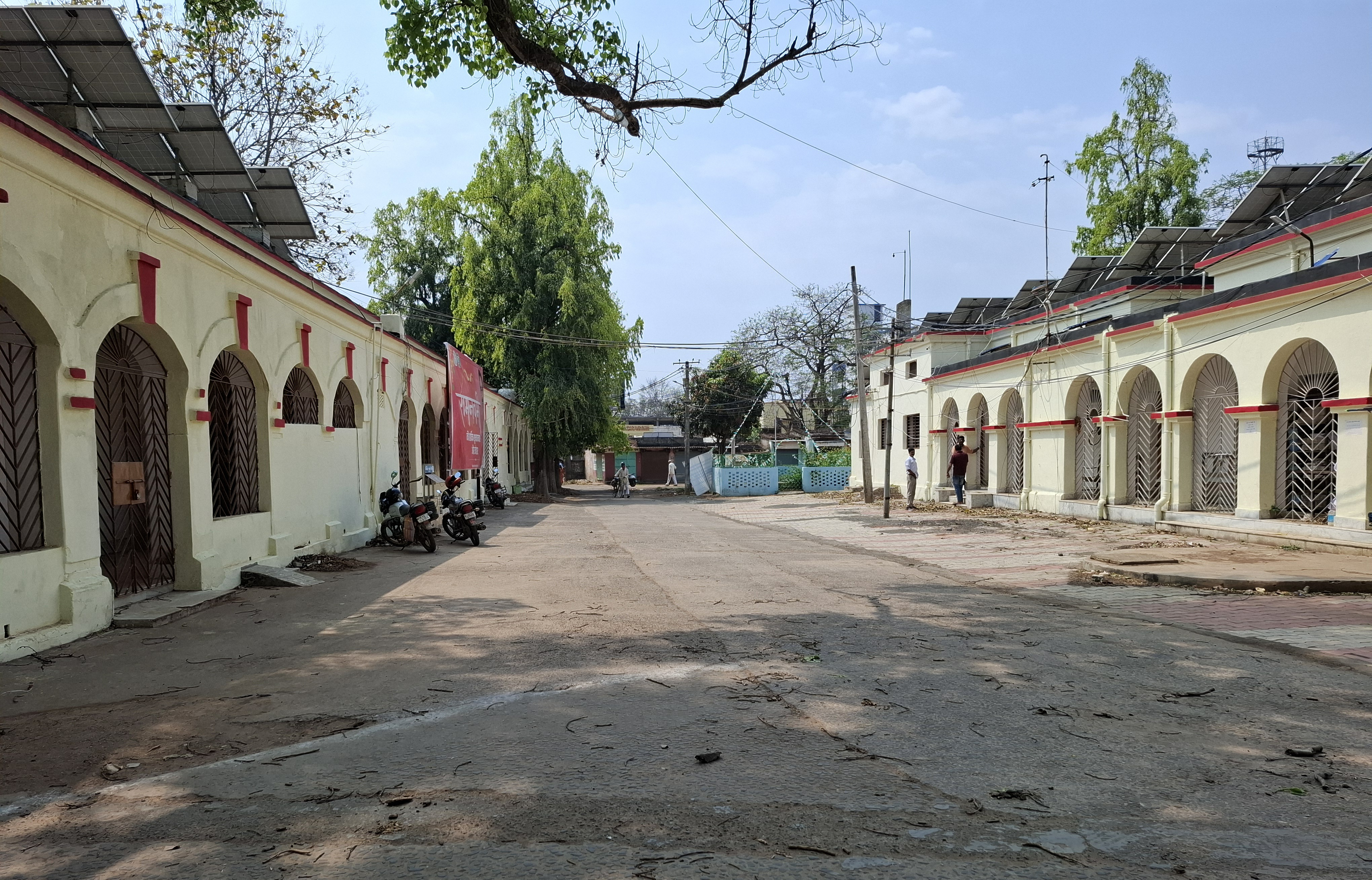
Deoghar District Court

The administration of Deoghar district is headed by the Deputy Commissioner (DC), an officer of the Indian Administrative Service (IAS). The DC acts as the head of the district and orders subordinate departmental officers to perform their duties. The office also coordinates the functioning of government departments, oversees the execution of development schemes, and implements welfare programmes for the district.

The Superintendent of Police (SP), an officer of the Indian Police Service (IPS), is responsible for maintaining law and order in the district. The SP works in close coordination with the DC and other officials of the police department.

In terms of urban governance, Deoghar district has two major urban local bodies (ULB):

- Deoghar city is administered by the Deoghar Municipal Corporation, which looks after civic amenities such as water supply, sanitation, solid waste management, roads, and street lighting.
- Madhupur town is administered by the Madhupur Municipality, which performs similar functions for the town's residents.

The rural areas of the district are governed through a three-tier system of Panchayati Raj institutions, consisting of village panchayats, panchayat samitis at the block level, and the Zila Parishad at the district level. These bodies are responsible for local development, implementation of welfare schemes, and delivery of basic services in villages.

== Demographics ==
Historical population
Year	Pop.	±% p.a.
1901	328,582	—
1911	341,867	+0.40%
1921	326,618	−0.46%
1931	373,326	+1.35%
1941	406,874	+0.86%
1951	422,824	+0.39%
1961	482,704	+1.33%
1971	584,632	+1.93%
1981	708,828	+1.94%
1991	933,113	+2.79%
2001	1,165,390	+2.25%
2011	1,492,073	+2.50%

Religion in Deoghar district (2011)
Religion	Percent
Hinduism	78.09%
Islam	20.28%
Sarna	1.08%
Other or not stated	0.55%

CD Block	Hindu %	Muslim %	Other %
Deoghar	92.27	6.94	0.79
Madhupur	60.40	38.07	1.53
Margomunda	47.16	48.35	4.49
Karon	75.73	22.58	1.69
Mohanpur	87.82	11.53	0.65
Palojori	65.32	31.13	3.55
Sarath	83.83	14.20	1.97
Devipur	80.96	17.31	1.73
Sarwan	88.62	11.18	0.20
Sonaraithari	71.10	27.51	1.39

According to the 2011 census, Deoghar district has a population of 1,492,073 (roughly equal to the nation of Gabon or the US state of Hawaii), which ranks it the 337th most populated district in India (out of a total of 640). The district has a population density of 602 inhabitants per square kilometre (1,560/sq mi). Its population growth rate over the decade 2001–2011 was 28.02%. Deoghar has a sex ratio of 921 females to 1000 males and a literacy rate of 64.85%. 17.32% of the population lives in urban areas. Scheduled Castes and Scheduled Tribes make up 12.74% and 12.13% of the population respectively.

Languages of Deoghar district (2011)
1. Khortha (65.4%)
2. Hindi (13.9%)
3. Santali (9.83%)
4. Urdu (6.71%)
5. Bengali (2.19%)
6. Others (1.96%)

At the time of the 2011 Census of India, 65.39% of the population in the district spoke Khortha, 13.92% Hindi, 9.83% Santali, 6.71% Urdu, and 2.19% Bengali as their first language.

== Culture ==
Deoghar city is usually referred to as the cultural capital of Jharkhand. The official languages of the city of Deoghar are Hindi, Khortha, Bangla while other native languages like Angika and Santhali are also spoken.

== Tourist attractions ==
The holy city is home to the various prominent tourists attraction such as :

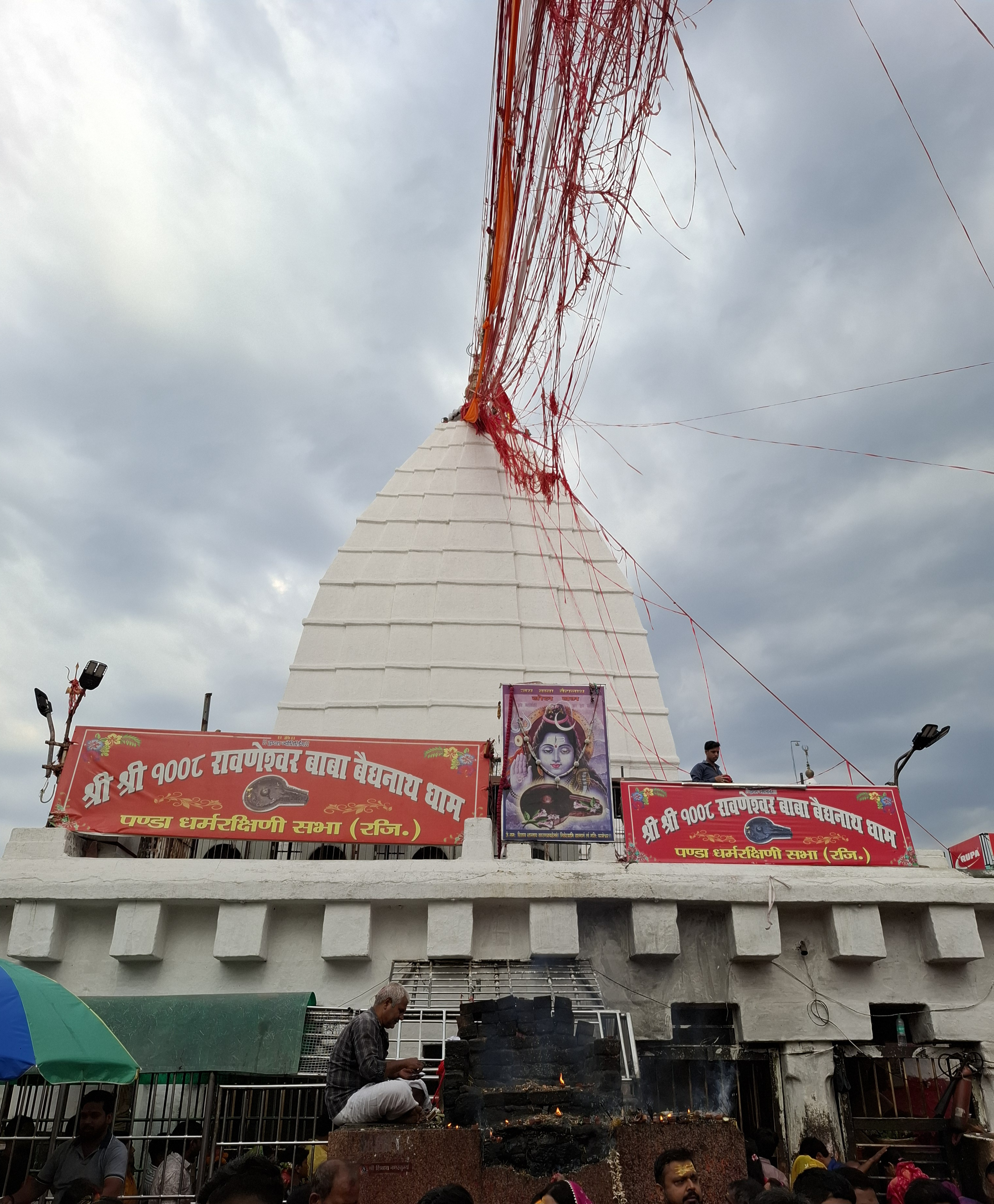
Shikharas of Baidyanath Temple

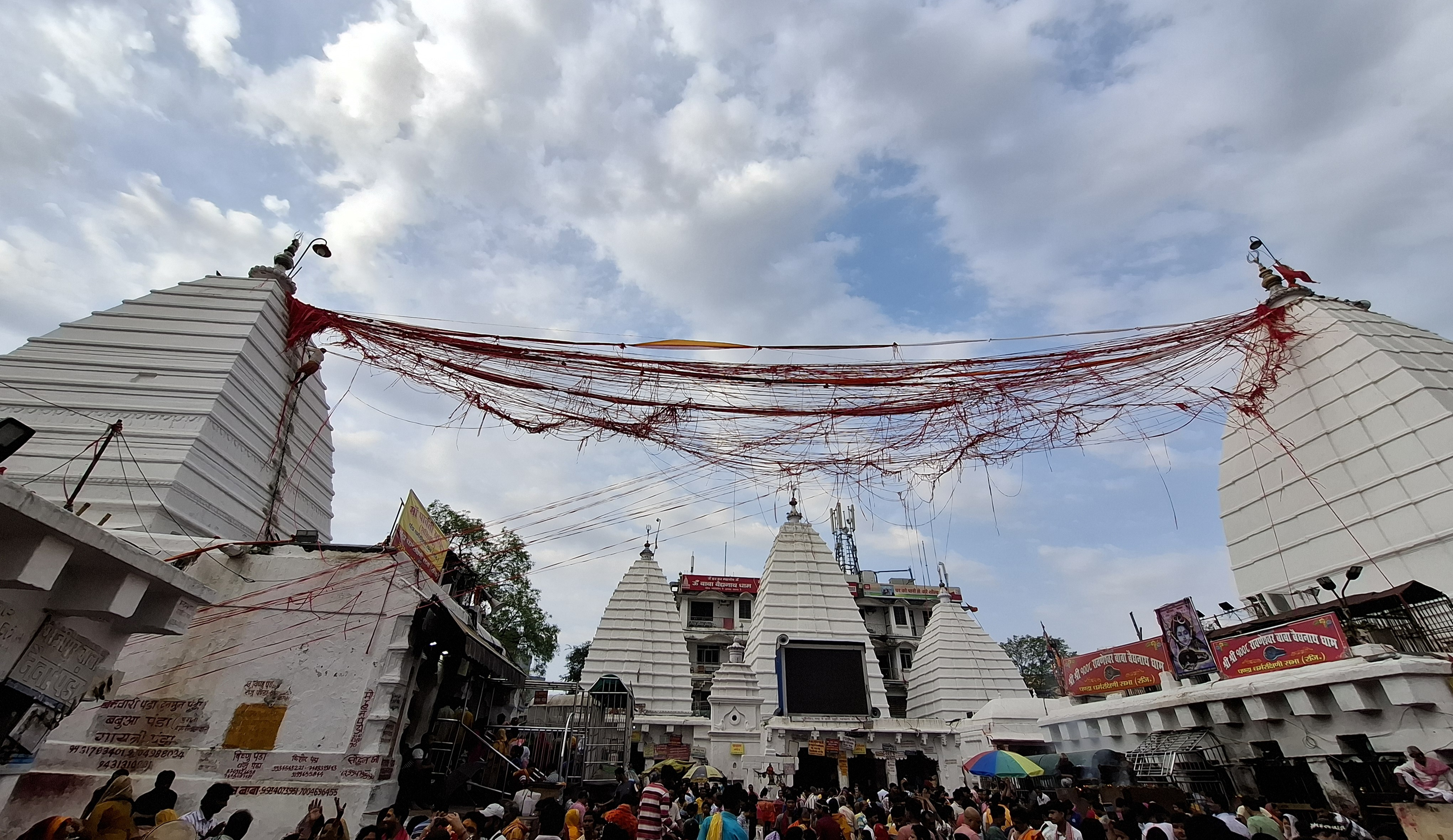
Baidyanath temple and Parvati Temple

1. Baidyanath Dham Temple: Baidyanath Jyotirlinga temple, also commonly referred to as the Baidyanath Dham, is one of the twelve Jyotirlinga in India and is considered to be the most sacred abodes of Shiva.The temple is located in Deoghar in the Santhal Parganas division of the state of Jharkhand in India. This large temple complex comprises the main temple of Baba Baidyanath, where the Jyotirlinga is installed, along with twenty-one other temples. This temple is also one of fifty one Shaktipeeth of Goddess Durga where It is believed that the heart of Sati fell at Baidyanath Dham when Vishnu used the Sudarshana Chakra, to cut Sati's corpse in order to stop Shiva's destruction. Here the deity is worshiped in form of Jaya Durga. The temple is mentioned in several ancient scriptures and continues to be mentioned even in modern-day history books. The story of the origin of this Jyotirlinga goes back to the Treta Yuga, in the era of Rama. According to popular Hindu beliefs, Ravana The King of Lanka Once felt that his capital would be incomplete and under the constant threat of enemies unless Shiva decides to stay there forever. So, he went to the Himalayas to impress the deity and started offering his heads one after another. When he was about to cut off his tenth head, Shiva descended on Earth impressed by his devotee. He then cured the wounded Ravana and granted him a boon. Ravana requested Shiva to allow him to take the Shivalinga back to Lanka with him to which the deity agreed but on one condition. Shiva warned Ravana that he cannot keep the Shivalinga on the ground until he reaches Lanka and if he does so it will get fixed to the ground and he will never be able to uproot it. Ravana agreed to the condition and began his journey. All the other God and Goddess were not happy with the decision because they knew, if Shiva went to Lanka with Ravana, then he would become invincible and his evil deeds would threaten the world. They met Vishnu and asked him to stop Ravana, the demon king from taking the Shivalinga to Lanka. Vishnu asked Varuna, the Ocean God to enter the stomach of Ravana at the time he performs Aachamanam during the Sandhya Vandana, the evening prayer. Aachamanam is a process of purifying by sipping drops of water while reciting the 21 names of Vishnu. When Ravana reached Deoghar, it was almost evening so he decided to perform his evening prayers. As asked, Varuna entered his stomach during the Aachamanam and Ravana felt an urgent need to release himself. He gave the Shivalinga to a milkman and asked him to take care of the lingam until he comes back. To utter surprise, the more Ravana released himself, the more he felt the urge. He took a long time to come back and the impatient milkman kept the shiva linga on the ground and went away. When Ravana finally returned he saw that the Shivalinga was fixed on the ground. He tried a lot to uproot it but failed miserably. Ravana damaged the Shivalinga in the process. He understood that the milkman was Vishnu who pranked him and left the place in anger. Later, God and Goddess came down from heaven and established the Shivalinga. Every monsoon (in the month of Shravan) millions of devotees undertake a rigorous 100 km (62 mi) pilgrimage on foot from Ajgaibinath, Sultanganj to offer holy water and prayers to Baba Baidyanath. The pilgrimage is deemed complete with homage paid at Basukinath which is almost 43 km (27 mi) from Deoghar.
2. Tapovan Caves and Hills: This series of caves and hills is located 10 km from Deoghar and has a temple of Shiva called Taponath Mahadeva. In one of the caves a Shiva lingam is installed, and it is said that Sage Valmiki came here for penance.
3. Naulakha Mandir: The Naulakha temple stands 146 ft high. It is very similar to the temple of Ramakrishna Mission in Belur Math and it is dedicated to Radha-Krishna. Since its construction cost ₹9 lakh, it is also known as Naulakha temple.
4. Basukinath Temple: Basukinath is a place of worship for Hindus and is located in the Dumka district of Jharkhand on the Deoghar-Dumka state highway. Pilgrims visit the temple each year from all of India to worship the presiding deity Shiva. The crowd at the temple drastically increases in the month of Shravan. It is widely believed that the Basukinath Temple is the court of Baba Bhole Nath. The temples of Shiva and Parvati are located in front of each other in the Basukinath Temple. The gates to both of these temples open in the evening, and it is believed that Shiva and Parvati meet each other at this time. Devotees are asked to move away from the front gates of the temple. Other small temples that are dedicated to different Gods and Goddesses can also be found inside the compound.
5. Satsang Ashram – It's the holy place where Sri Sri Thakur Anukuchandra had spent his life. Many devotees come everyday here to have darsan of Thakur Parivar. This is the epicenter of the Satsang Revolution and also the chief centre of this movement. In the Ashram many devotees live permanently as natives.
6. Trikut Hill – Trikut Hill is a trendy picnic spot and a pilgrimage site located 21 km from the main city. This Hills contains three peaks, and the highest mountain peak goes up to an elevation of 2470 feet from sea level and about 1500 feet wide ground. However, the single hill conglomeration of 3 peaks that stand together in the form of a trident and hence contributing to the name of the hill, Trikutachal. This three peaks are named after Hindu Gods, Bramha, Vishnu and Mahesh among which two peaks are only open for tourists. The foothills of the Trikut hill are encircled by the Mayurakshi River which flows majorly through the state of West Bengal, just adjacent to Jharkhand, before eventually emptying out into the Hooghly River and joining the Ganges. The origin of the Mayurakshi River, the substance of many popular literary epithets and texts in Bengali culture and tradition has its source of origin in the Trikut Pahad or Trikut Hill in English. The Trikut Pahad is also a significant location for its natural elevation for solar power projects as well as a very ambitious ropeway project that it can be accessed by which provides a panoramic view of the scenery and landscape around. The Trikut Pahad itself also provides for great view and is an ideal spot for photographic exploits. It serves as major touristic destination where people come every year to picnic and to indulge in fun activities such as Trekking, Ropeway and Wildlife Adventures It is covered by clouds in the rainy seasons and gives rise to many rivulets and streamlets that form from its slopes and continue as waterfalls before emptying into Tapovan, the spot for the famous Tapovan Mahadev temple, the revered shrine of the Hindu deity Shiva.
7. Rikhiyapith – Rikhiapeeth is where Swami Satyananda lived the life of a Paramahansa Yogi, for twenty years performing long and arduous yogic sadhanas before taking Samadhi here in 2009. In keeping with the yogic and spiritual legacy he left behind, the sprawling ashram has evolved into a vibrant epicentre where serious yoga lovers and sincere spiritual seekers from all walks of life, flock to experience the peace, harmony and true joy of living a Yogic lifestyle.
8. Ramakrishna Mission Vidyapith, Deoghar

=== Shravani Mela ===
The importance of Baba Baidyanath Dham increases during the month of Shrawan. During this period, many devotees crowd gathered here for worship to Baba Baidyanath. Most of the tourists and devotees first visit Sultanganj, which is 108 km from Deoghar

In Sultanganj, the Ganges flows to the north. Devotees collect water from the river in their kanwars and walk 109 km up to Baba Baidyanath temple at Babadham, reciting Bol Bam on the way. On reaching Babadham, the kanwarias first take a dip in the Shivaganga to purify themselves and then enter the Baba Baidyanath temple, where the Ganges water is offered to the Jyotirlingam. This pilgrimage continues during the whole of Shravan for 30 days, from July–August, but may be extended at times in lieu of an extra month in the Hindu calendar. This is the longest religious fair in the world. The sight on the way from Sultanganj to Babadham is of a 109 km long human chain of saffron-clad pilgrims. It is estimated that during Shravan around 5.0 to 5.5 million pilgrims visit Baba Baidyanath Dham.

== Education ==
Deoghar College in Deoghar city was founded in 1951. It is one of the constituent colleges of Sido Kanhu Murmu University at Dumka.

Other colleges include AS College and RD Bajla Mahila College.

Ramakrishna Mission Vidyapith, Deoghar is a residential school founded in 1922 and is known for its quality education in the secondary and higher secondary section. The school is affiliated to Central Board of Secondary Education(CBSE), New Delhi and it is managed by Rama Krishna Mission, Belur, in Kolkata. It has a residential secondary and senior secondary school, a well-equipped charitable medical unit with modern diagnostic facilities, a centre for academic coachings to school-going children for their overall growth and career building.

Birla Institute of Technology, Deoghar is an educational institute offering undergraduate courses located in Deoghar, Jharkhand, India since 2007. It is an extension center of BIT, Mesra, Ranchi from 2007 It admits students through the JEE (Mains) entrance examination and counseling. Recently a new school Takshashila Vidyapith, Deoghar, has also been built with the latest facilities in the year 2010. There are two branches of the G.D. D.A.V. Public School: the G.D D.A.V. Public School Bhandarkola in the city suburbs, and G.D. D.A.V. Public School Castair's Town in the town center, near Tower Chowk.

A branch of All India Institute of Medical Science opened in 2019 at the extension in Deoghar district. It has been inducting MBBS students through NEET exams since 2019. It admitted 50 students in the first batch and increased it to 62 in the year 2021.

== Healthcare ==
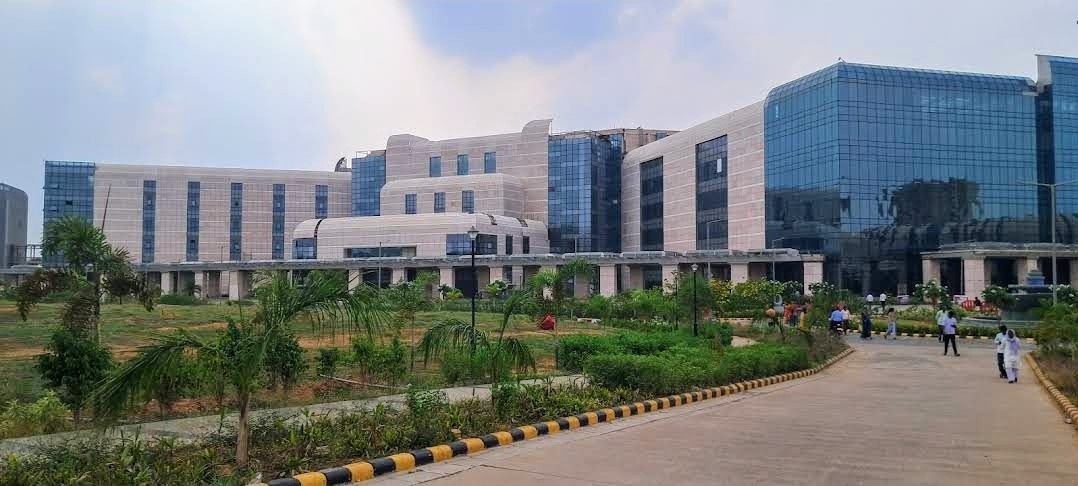
Campus view of AIIMS, Deoghar

- All India Institute of Medical Sciences, Deoghar is a medical school established by the Ministry of Health & Family Welfare, Government of India under the Pradhan Mantri Swasthya Suraksha Yojna (PMSSY), with the aim to provide better medical facilities and health care treatments. As of now 40-room outpatient department was inaugurated by the Minister of Health and Family Welfare, Mansukh Mandaviya, on 24 August 2021, including a night shelter facility for the patients and attendants. Online registration facilities were launched on 3 September 2021. The 750-beds inpatient department (IPD) and operation theatre will soon be opened for public. The inauguration is set to be done by Prime Minister Narendra Modi.
- District Hospital, Deoghar offer treatment and surgeries. Blood bank facility is also provided for needy donor.

== Gallery ==
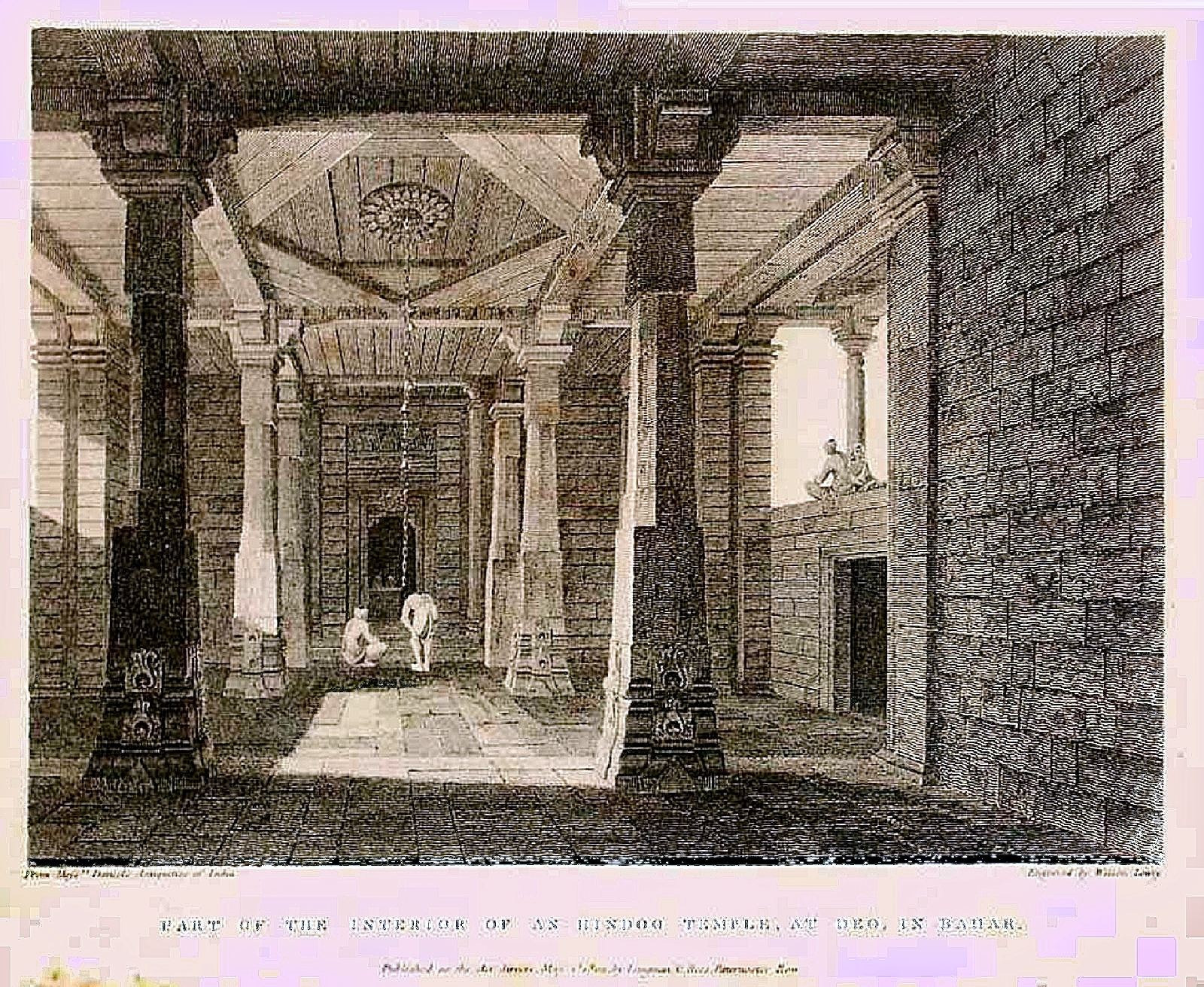
Part of the interior of a Hindu Temple, at Deo, in Bahar, from Rees's Cyclopedia, 1802

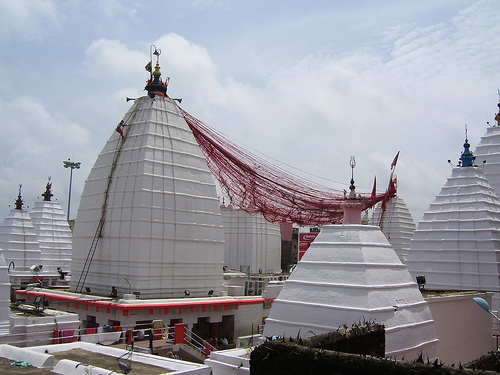
Baidyanath Dham

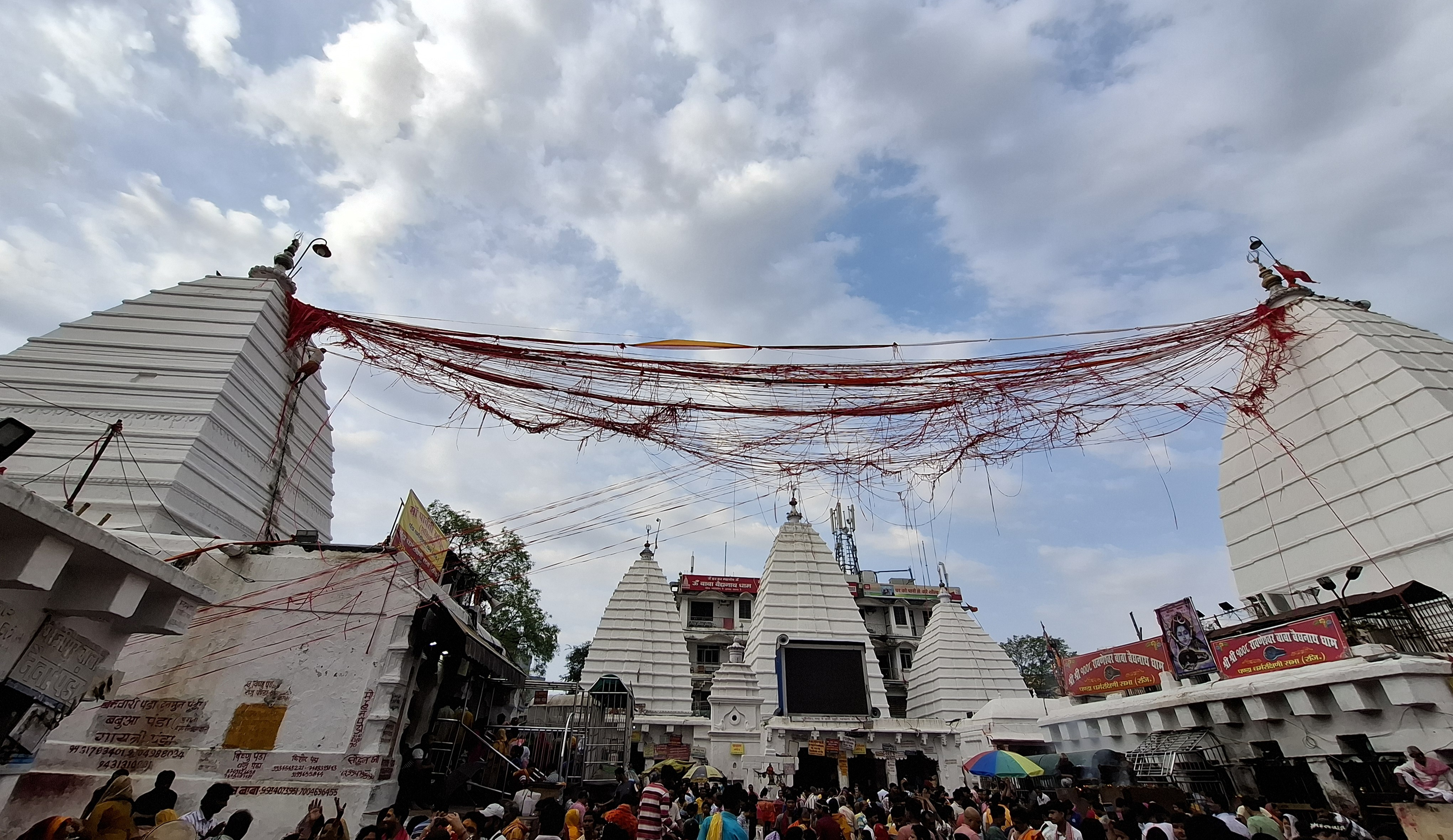
Baidyanath and Parbati temple

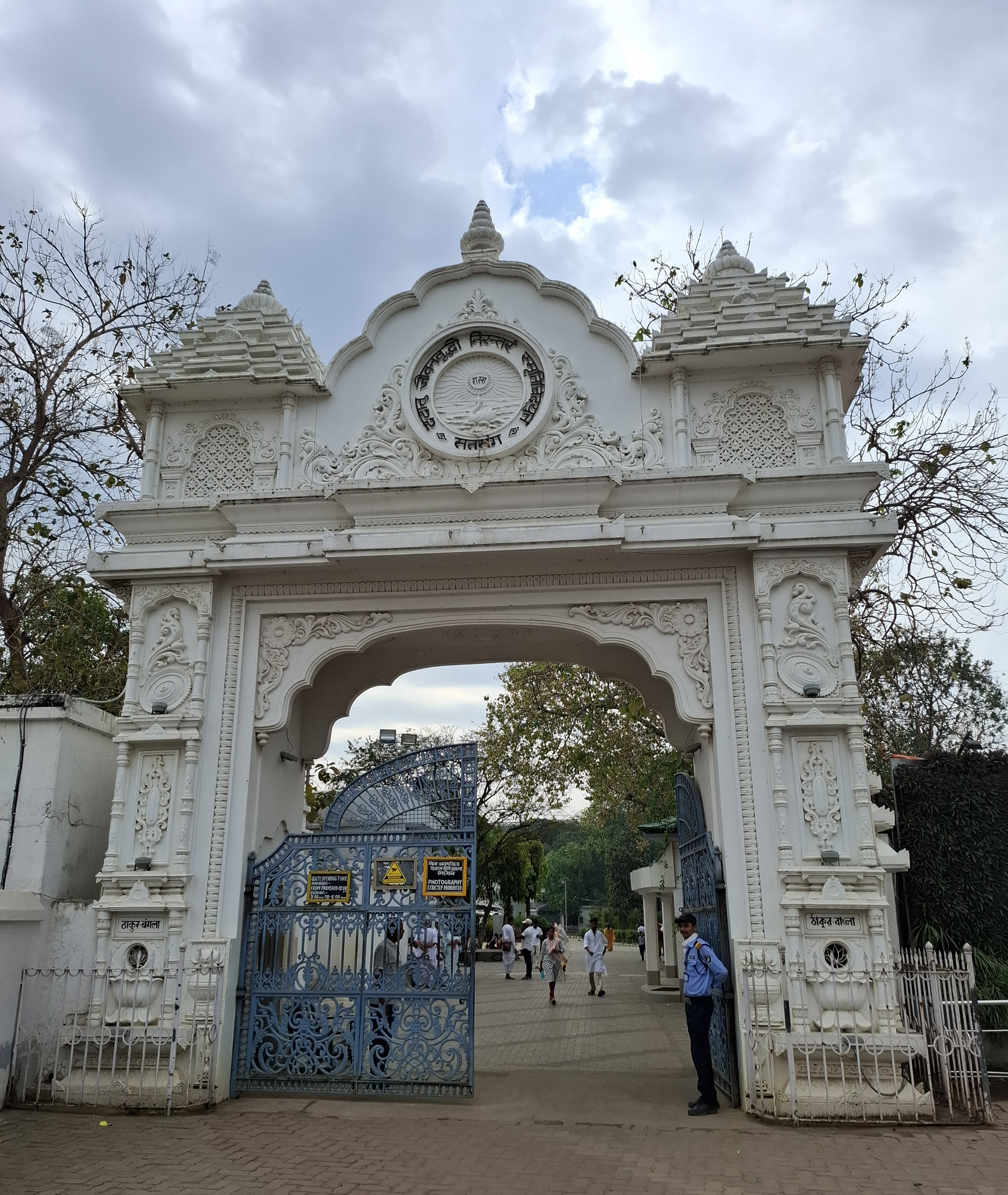
Depghar Satsang Ashram

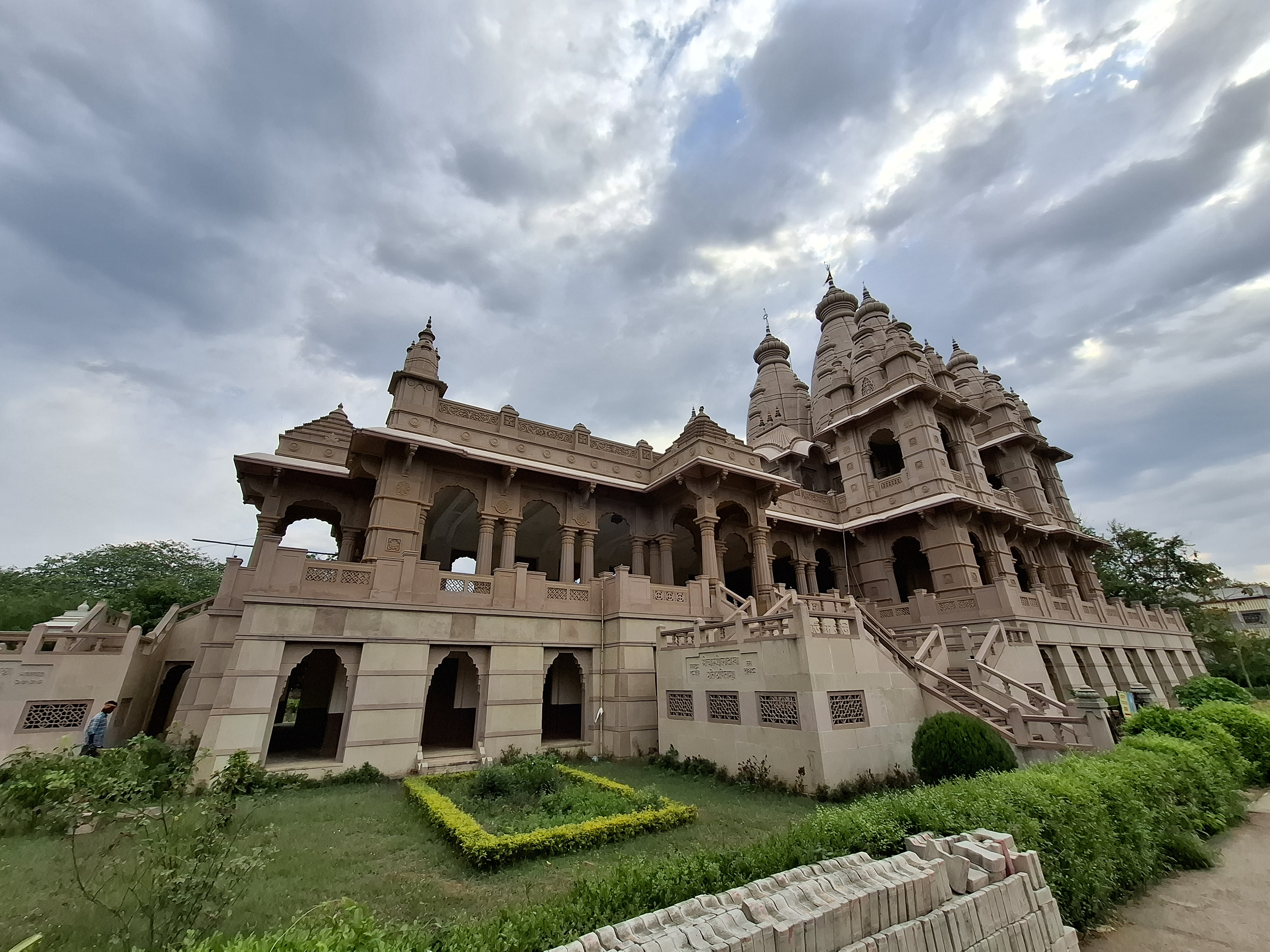
Naulakkha Temple

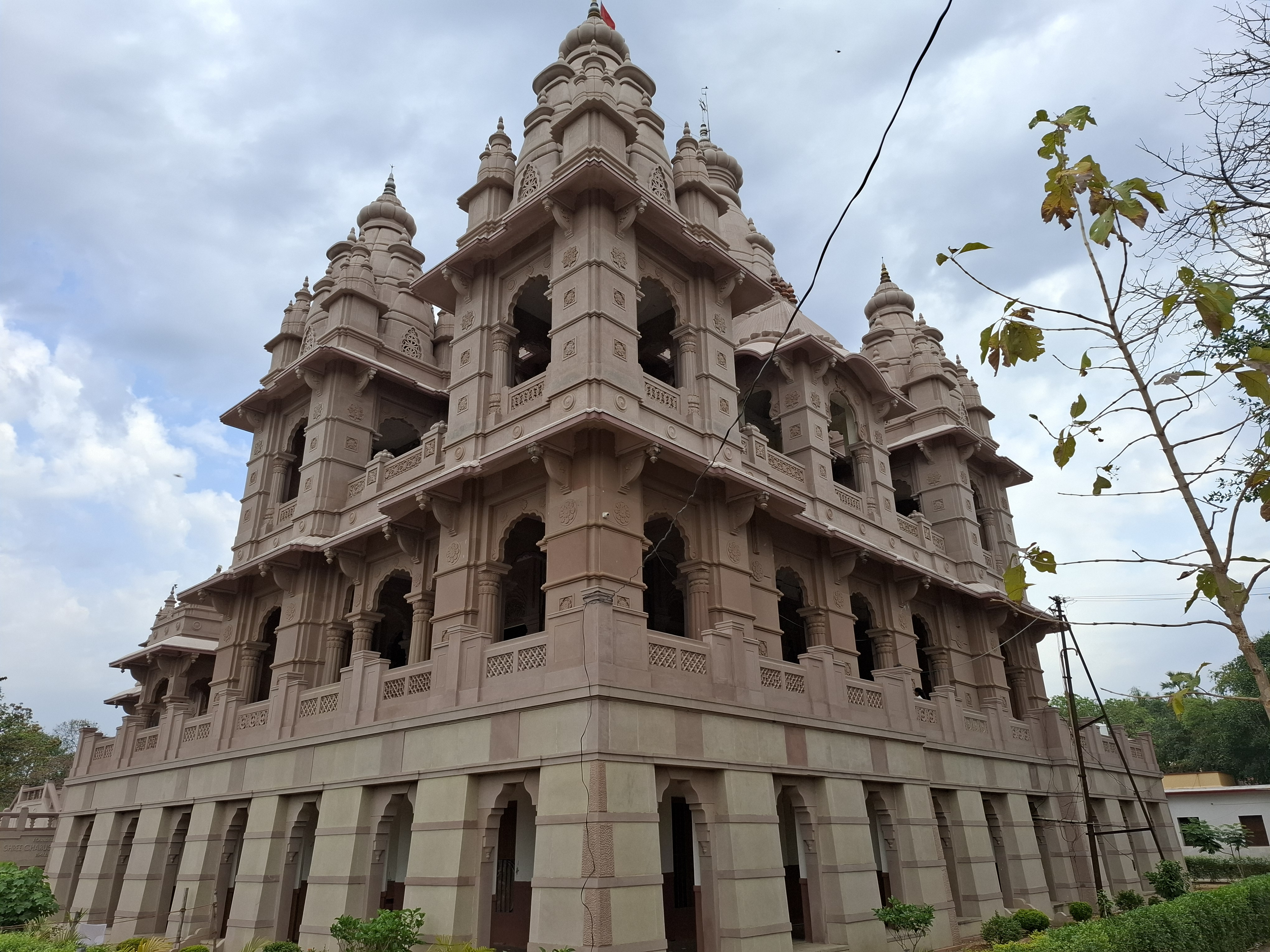

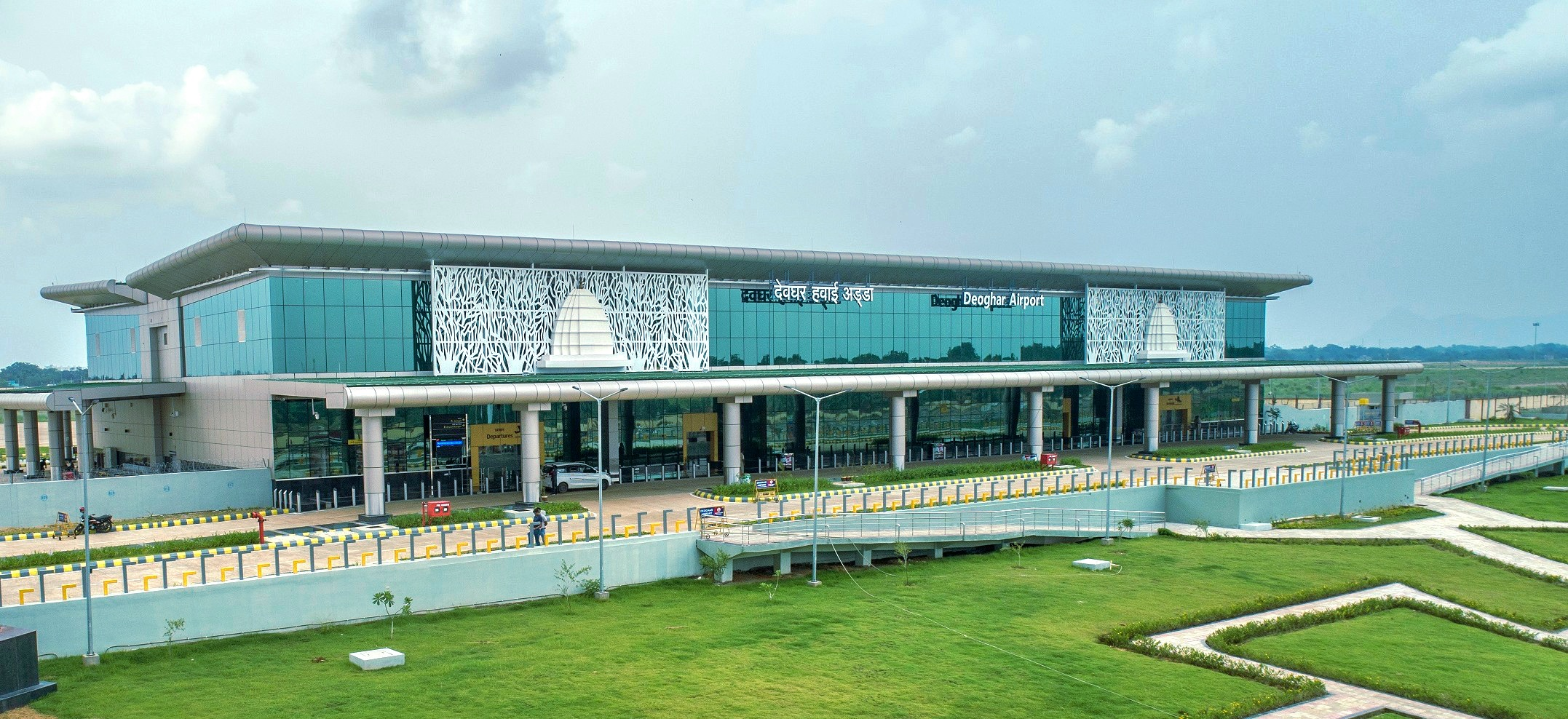
Deoghar Airport

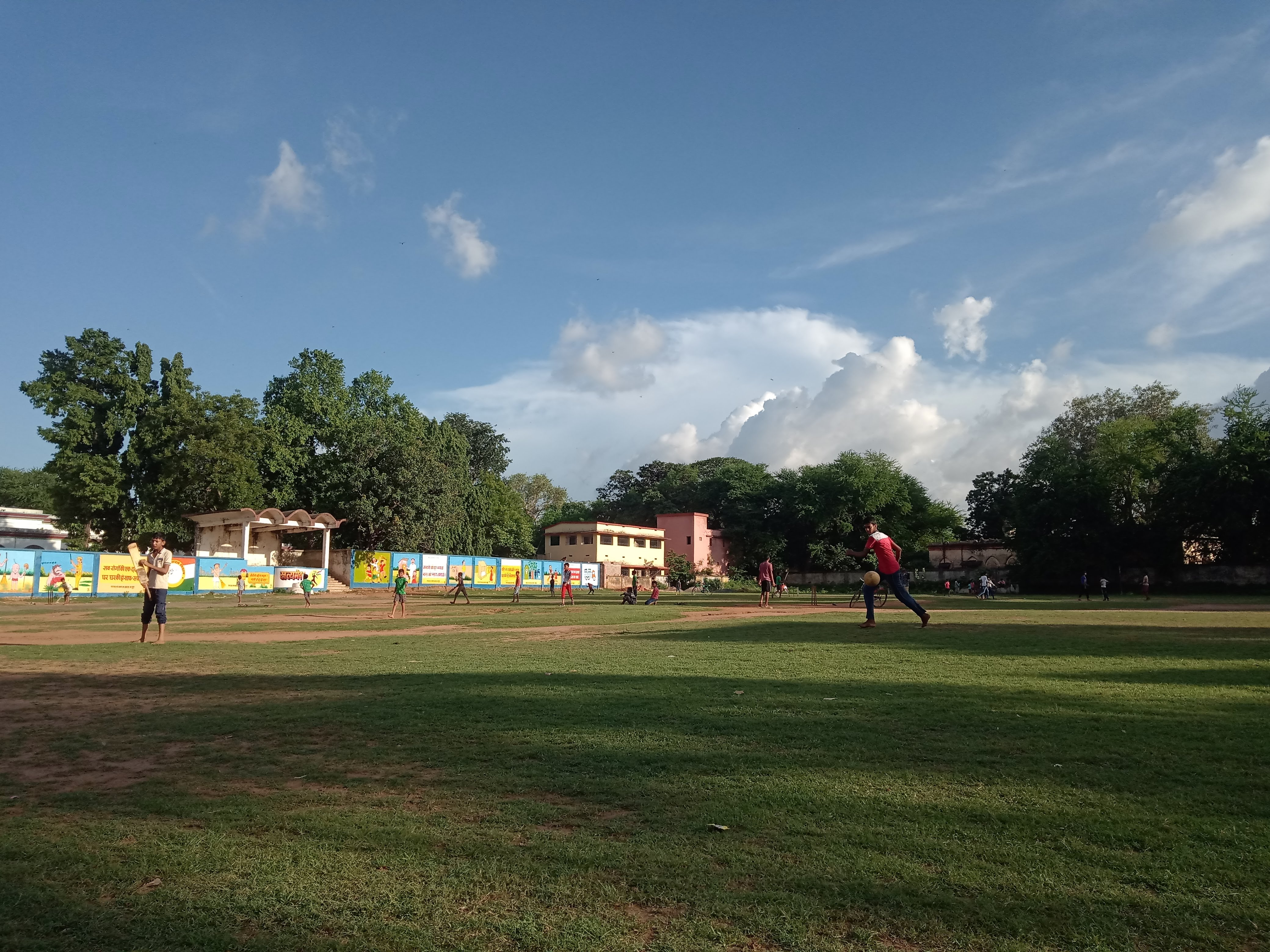
Dakbangla Ground, Madhupur

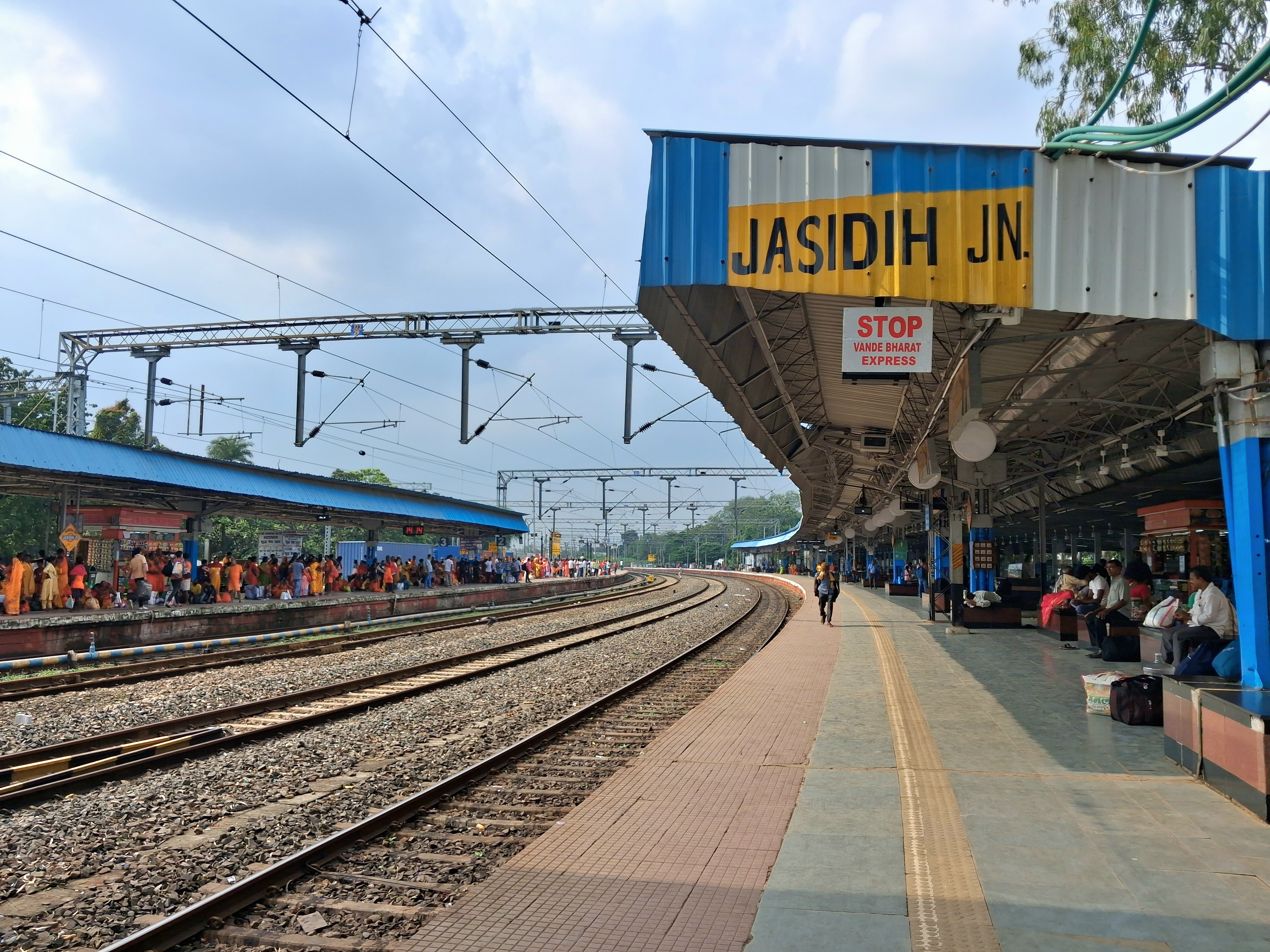
Jasidih Junction

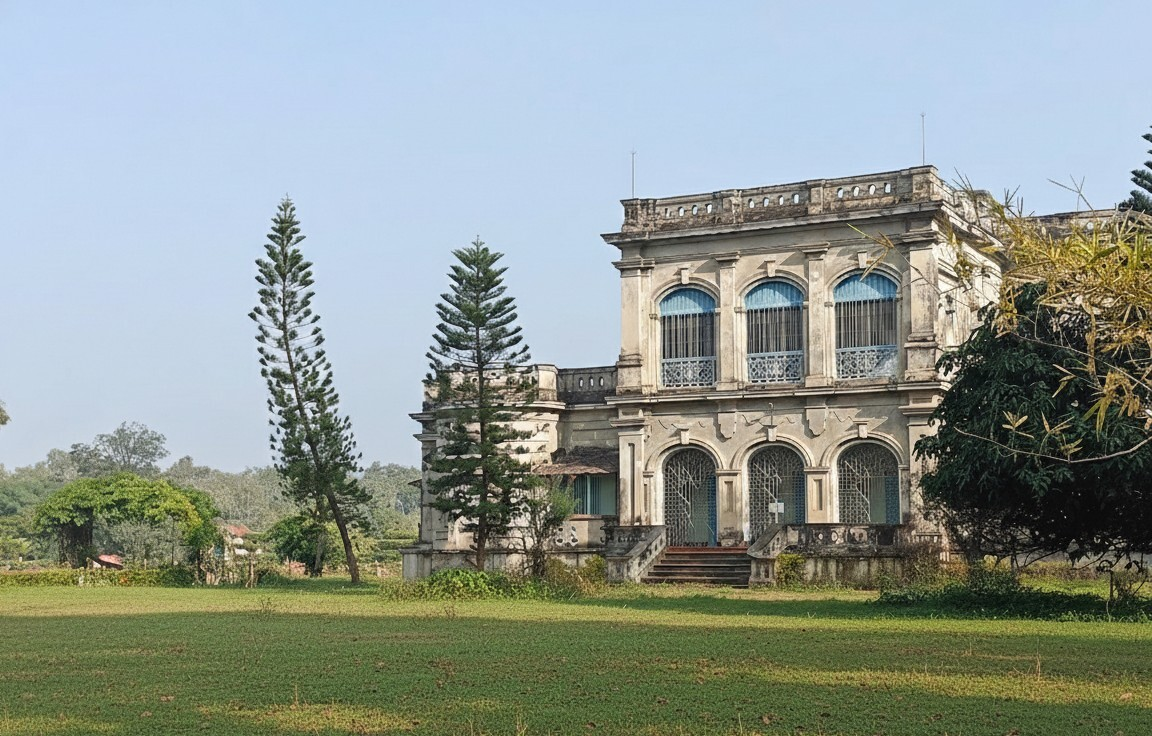
Sett Villa Heritage Guest House, Madhupur

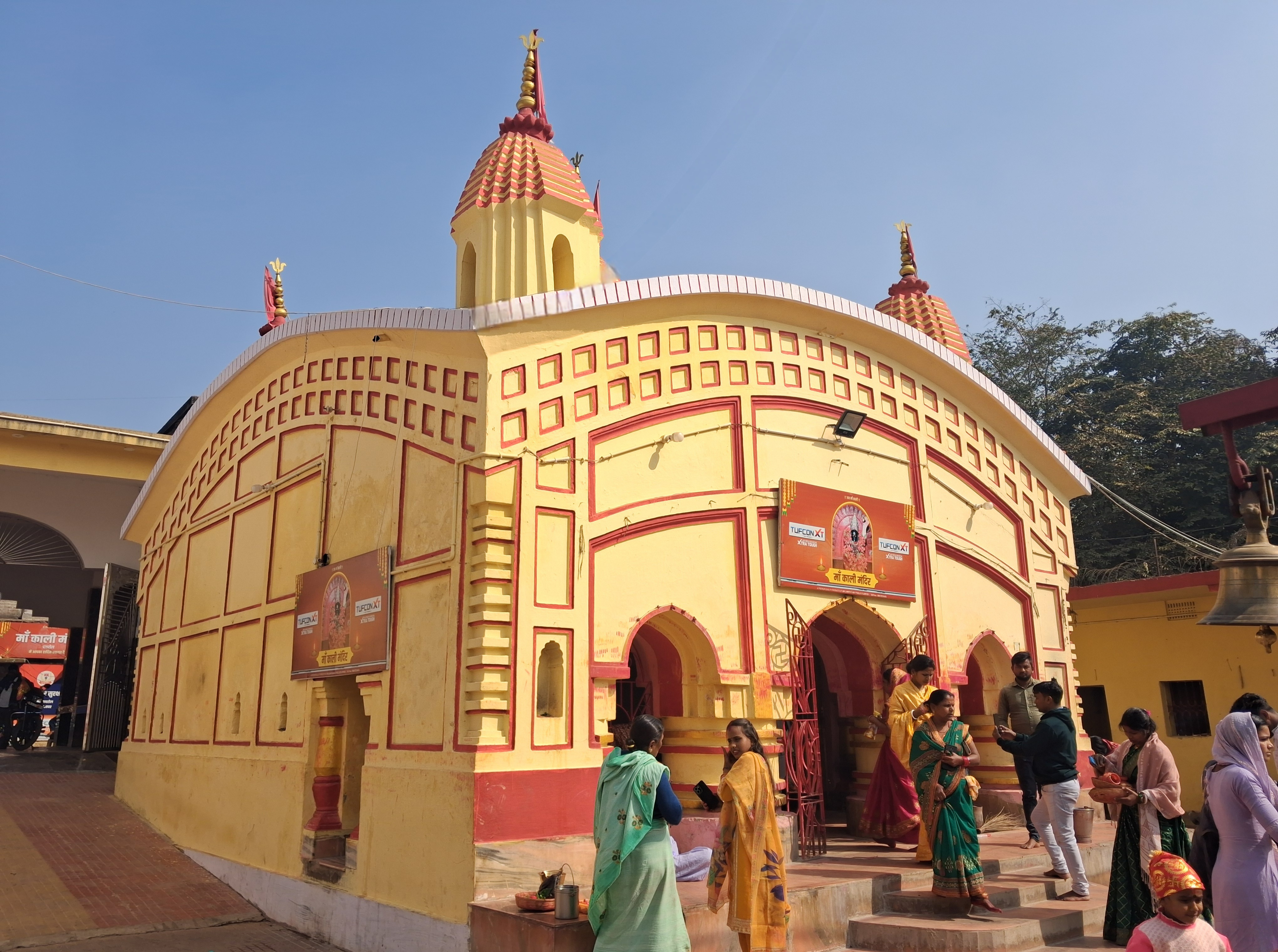
Pathrol Kali Temple, Madhupur

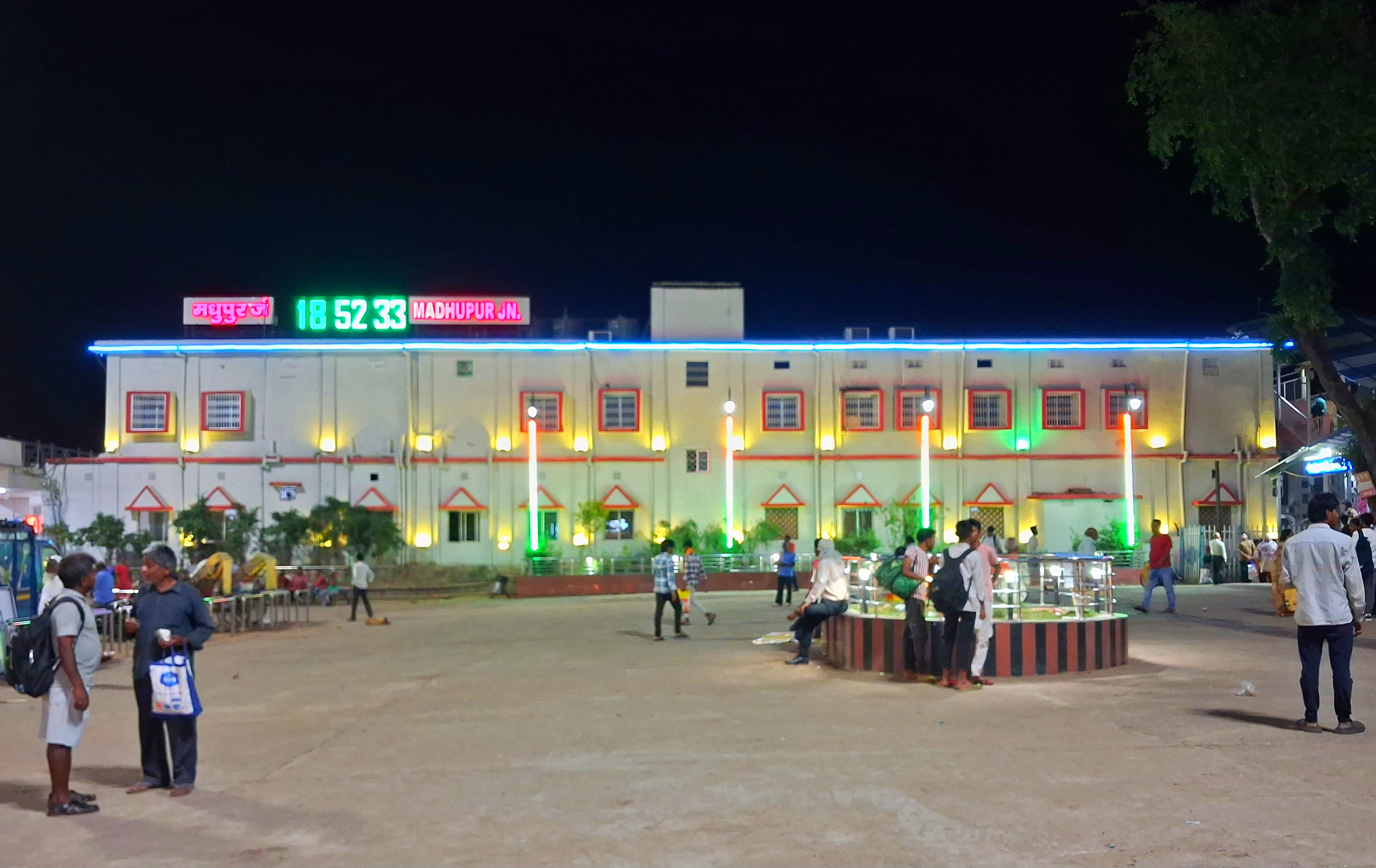
Madhupur Junction entry point

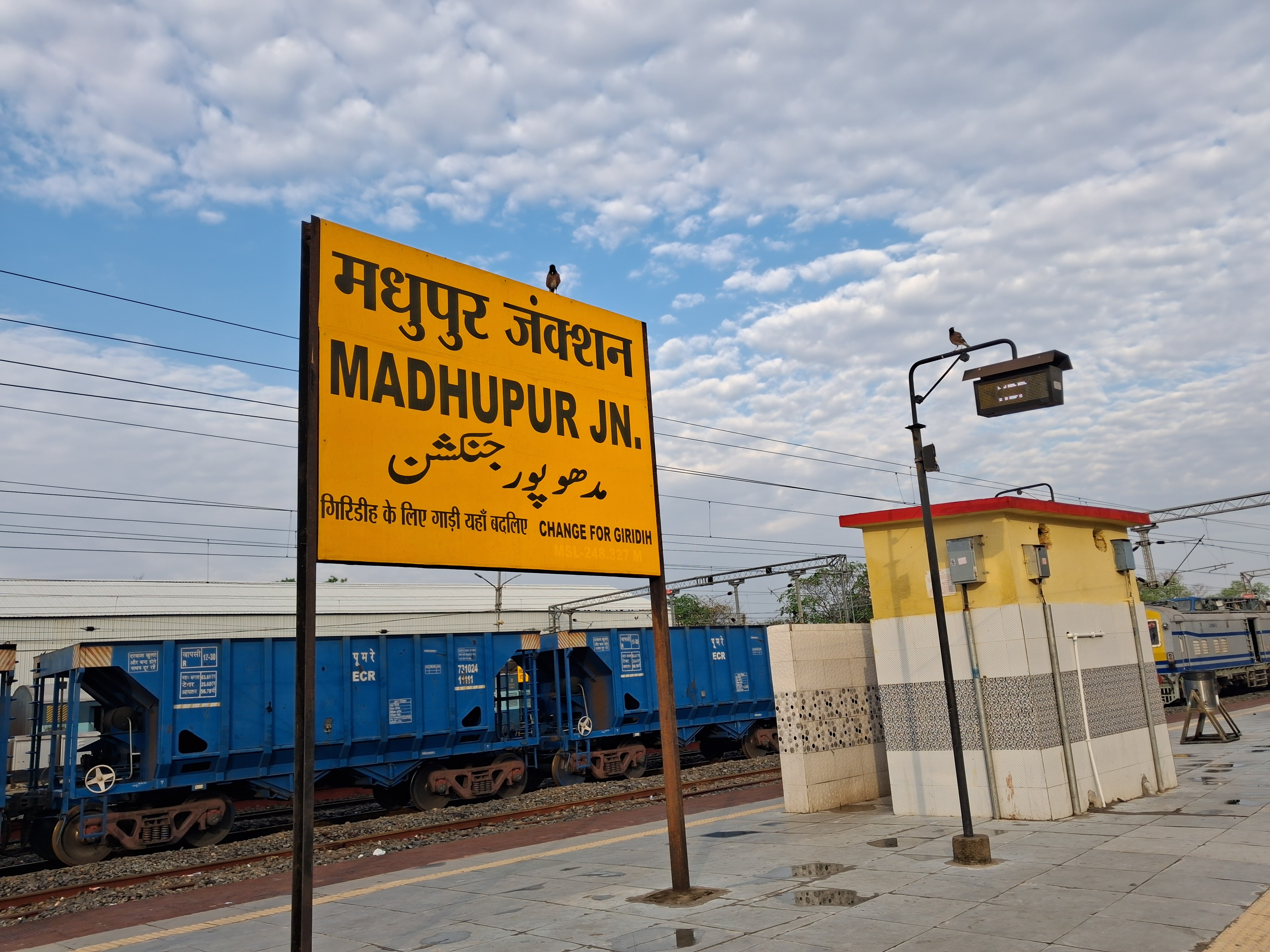
