= Naulakha Temple, Deoghar =

Temple in Jharkhand, India

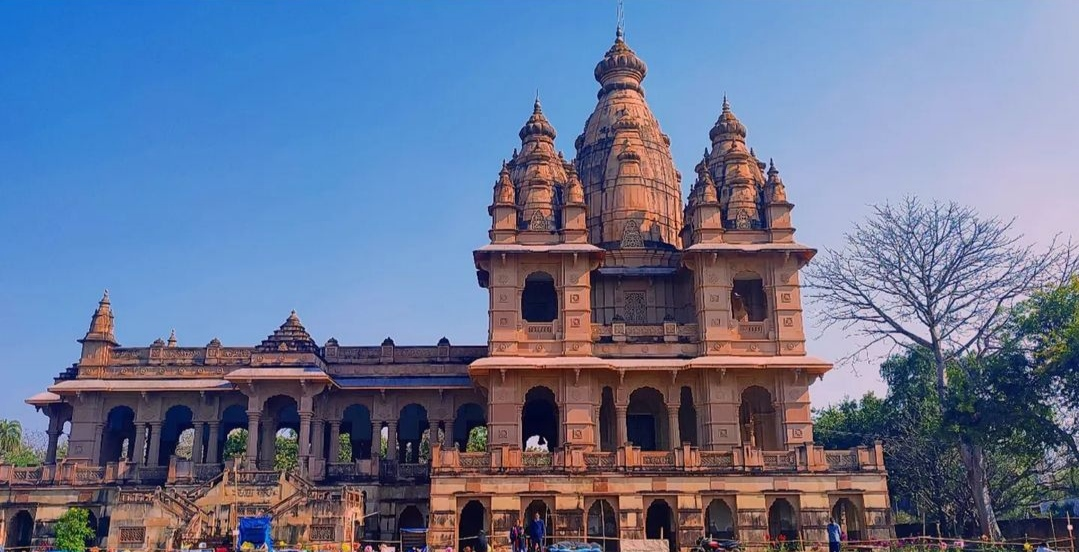

- Location in Deoghar, Jharkhand

Religion
- Affiliation: Hinduism
- District: Deoghar
- Deity: Radha Krishna

Location
- Location: Deoghar
- State: Jharkhand
- Country: India
- Interactive map of Naulakha Temple, Deoghar
- Coordinates: 24°28′59″N 86°42′00″E

Architecture
- Creator: Rani Charushila
- Completed: 1940

Specifications
- Height (max): 146 ft (45 m)
- Materials: granite and marble

The Naulakha Temple is a Hindu temple located in Deoghar, Jharkhand, India. It is dedicated to the Hindu deities Radha and Krishna.

== Location ==
The Naulakha temple is situated in Deoghar, the headquarters of the Deoghar district in Jharkhand, India. Deoghar is a renowned pilgrimage site for Hindus, as it is home to one of the twelve jyotirlingas of Hinduism, the Baidyanath temple.

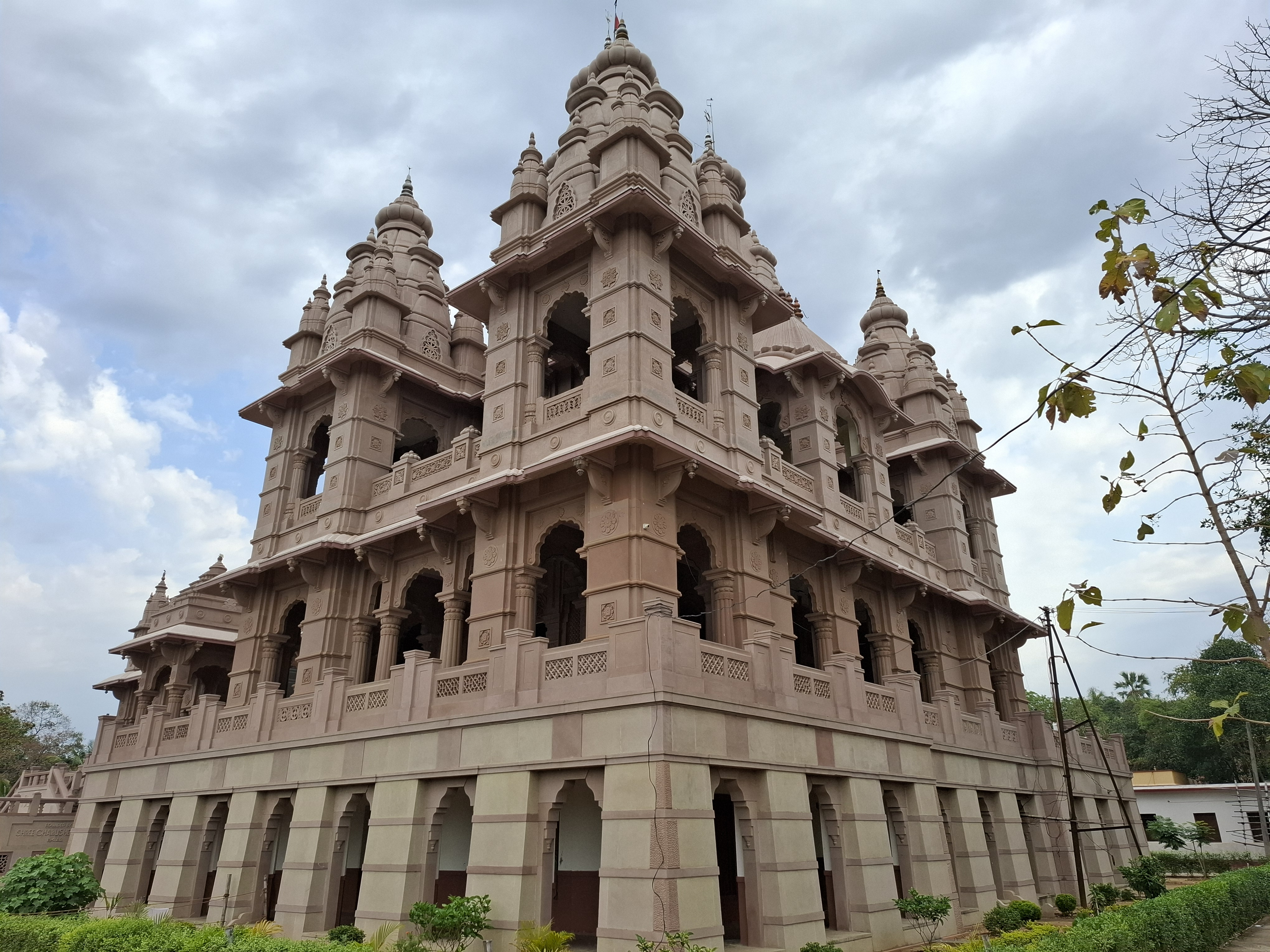
Naulakkha Temple side view

The Naulakha temple sits at a distance of 1.5 km (0.6 mi) from the Baidyanath temple. The nearest railway station is Deoghar Junction railway station, and the nearest airport is Deoghar Airport.

== History ==
The Naulakha temple was built by Rani Charushila, who belonged to the Ghosh family, a Bengali royal family of Pathuriaghata in Kolkata. Charushila lost her husband, Akshay Ghosh and son, Jatindra Ghosh prematurely. This devastated her, causing her to leave her home in search of peace.

Later, while in Deoghar, Charushila came across the saint Balananda Brahmachari, at whose ashram she stayed awhile. Upon his advice, she decided to build the Naulakha temple, sanctioning an amount of nine lakh rupees for its construction—thereby earning it the name, Naulakha. The temple was completed in 1940.

== Description ==
The temple stands 146 ft (45 m) tall. It is made of granite and marble. It houses idols of Radha, Krishna, Gopal and Balananda Brahmachari. At its entrance sits a sculpture of Rani Charushila. The architectural design of the temple resembles that of Ramakrishna Mission, Belur Math.
