= South Chotanagpur division =

Coordinates: 23.05°N 84.54°E

- Division of Jharkhand
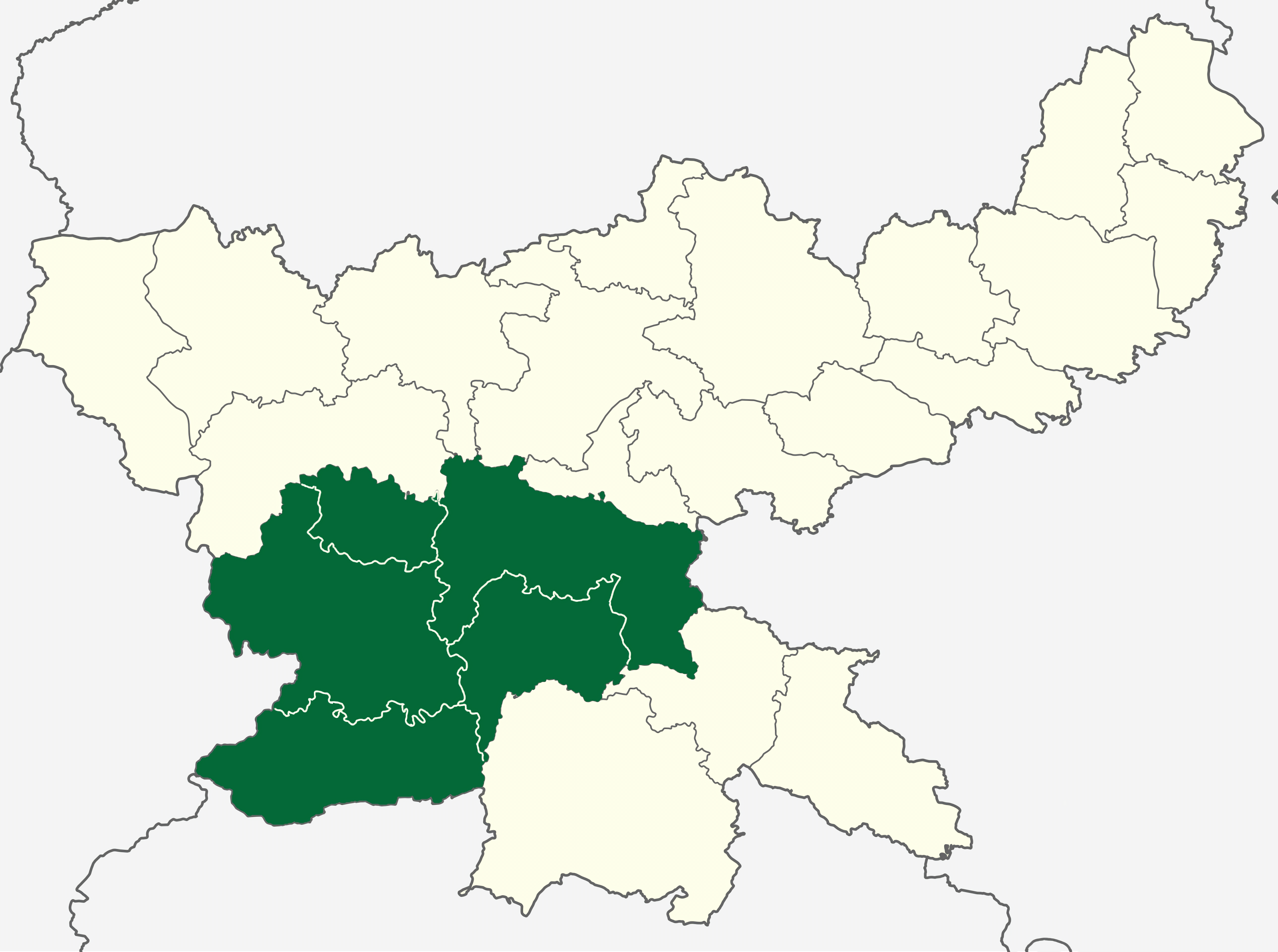
- Location of South Chotanagpur Division in Jharkhand
- Country: India
- State: Jharkhand
- Headquarters: Ranchi
- Districts: Ranchi, Gumla, Khunti, Lohardaga, Simdega

Government
  - Commissioner: Manoj Kumar (IAS)
  - Inspector General of Police: Shri Manoj Kaushik (IPS)

Area
  - Total: 18,235 km^{2} (7,041 sq mi)

Population (2011)
  - Total: 5,532,719
  - Density: 303.41/km^{2} (785.83/sq mi)

South Chotanagpur division is one of the five divisions in the Indian state of Jharkhand. The South Chotanagpur Division, also known as the Ranchi Division. The division comprises the following districts: Gumla, Khunti, Lohardaga, Ranchi and Simdega. It was earlier a part of Chota Nagpur Division.

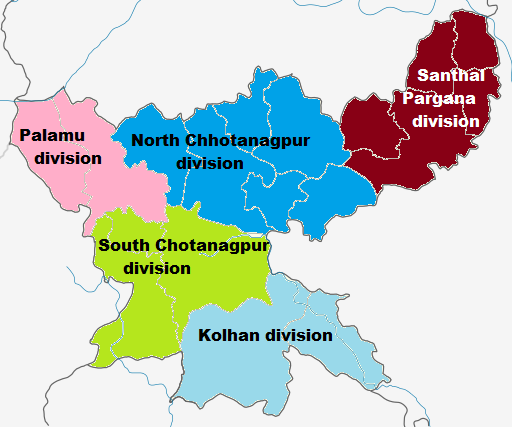
Location of South Chotanagpur division in Jharkhand, in green

== Languages ==
Languages of South Chotanagpur division (2011)
1. Sadri (36.5%)
2. Hindi (18.1%)
3. Kurukh (12.9%)
4. Mundari (11.8%)
5. Kurmali (6.55%)
6. Urdu (6.32%)
7. Kharia (2.41%)
8. Bengali (1.38%)
9. Bhojpuri (1.28%)
10. Others (2.70%)
