= Kolhan (village) =

Village in Maharashtra

- village
- Location in Maharashtra, India Kolhan (India)
- Coordinates: 19.8743915°N 72.9327686°E
- Country: India
- State: Maharashtra
- District: Palghar
- Taluka: Dahanu
- Elevation: 44 m (144 ft)

Population (2011)
  - Total: 693
- Time zone: UTC+5:30 (IST)
- ISO 3166 code: IN-MH
- 2011 census code: 551711

Kolhan is a village in the Palghar district of Maharashtra, India. It is located in the Dahanu taluka.

== Demographics ==
According to the 2011 census of India, Kolhan has 122 households. The effective literacy rate (i.e. the literacy rate of population excluding children aged 6 and below) is 58.32%.

Demographics (2011 Census)
	Total	Male	Female
Population	693	340	353
Children aged below 6 years	134	65	69
Scheduled caste	0	0	0
Scheduled tribe	680	333	347
Literates	326	192	134
Workers (all)	390	190	200
Main workers (total)	322	165	157
Main workers: Cultivators	185	90	95
Main workers: Agricultural labourers	16	9	7
Main workers: Household industry workers	1	1	0
Main workers: Other	120	65	55
Marginal workers (total)	68	25	43
Marginal workers: Cultivators	8	4	4
Marginal workers: Agricultural labourers	12	2	10
Marginal workers: Household industry workers	4	2	2
Marginal workers: Others	44	17	27
Non-workers	303	150	153
