= Subdivisions of Jharkhand =

Subdivision is an administrative unit below district level and above the block or Tehsil level in the Indian state of Jharkhand. Presently there are 45 subdivisions in 24 districts of Jharkhand. Subdivisions are a group of blocks and it is administered by Sub-divisional Officer (SDO) also called as Sub-divisional Magistrate (SDM) who performs functions similar to those of the District Magistrate (DM) at the subdivision level.

In Jharkhand, SDMs are officers of either the Indian Administrative Service (IAS) or the Jharkhand Administrative Service (JAS), with the majority belonging to the IAS. Similarly, law and order situation in a subdivision is overseen by a Sub-divisional Police Officer (SDPO), who generally holds the rank of Deputy Superintendent of Police (Dy.SP).

== List of subdivisions ==
Districts	Subdivisions
Bokaro	Bermo subdivision
Bokaro	Chas subdivision
Chatra	Chatra subdivision
Chatra	Simaria subdivision
Deoghar	Deoghar subdivision
Deoghar	Madhupur subdivision
Dhanbad	Dhanbad Sadar subdivision
Dumka	Dumka Sadar subdivision
East Singhbhum	Dhalbhum subdivision
East Singhbhum	Ghatshila subdivision
Garhwa	Garhwa subdivision
Garhwa	Nagar Untari subdivision
Garhwa	Ranka subdivision
Giridih	Bagodar-Saria subdivision
Giridih	Dumri subdivision
Giridih	Giridih Sadar subdivision
Giridih	Khori Mahuwa subdivision
Godda	Godda subdivision
Godda	Mahagama subdivision
Gumla	Gumla subdivision
Gumla	Chainpur subdivision
Gumla	Basia subdivision
Hazaribagh	Barhi subdivision
Hazaribagh	Hazaribagh Sadar subdivision
Jamtara	Jamtara Sadar subdivision
Khunti	Khunti subdivision
Koderma	Koderma subdivision
Latehar	Latehar Sadar subdivision
Latehar	Mahuadanr subdivision
Lohardaga	Lohardaga subdivision
Pakur	Pakur subdivision
Palamu	Medininagar subdivision
Palamu	Chhatarpur subdivision
Palamu	Husainabad subdivision
Ramgarh	Ramgarh subdivision
Ranchi	Bundu subdivision
Ranchi	Ranchi Sadar subdivision
Sahebganj	Rajmahal subdivision
Sahebganj	Sahibganj subdivision
Seraikela Kharsawan	Chandil subdivision
Seraikela Kharsawan	Seraikela Sadar subdivision
Simdega	Simdega subdivision
West Singhbhum	Chaibasa subdivision
West Singhbhum	Jagannathpur subdivision
West Singhbhum	Porahat subdivision
