= Divisional commissioner (India) =

Administrator of a division of a state in India

Commissioner of Division
- Flag of India

- Divisional Commissioner of Presidency division's office in Kolkata
- Type: Administrator of a division of a state in India
- Abbreviation: D.C. or C.D.
- Member of: Indian Administrative Service; State Civil Services
- Seat: Commissioner office
- Appointer: Respective Government of Indian State and Union Territories
- Formation: 1829 (197 years ago)
- Salary: ₹1,44,200-1,82,200 and various other allowances and facilities

A Divisional Commissioner, also known as Commissioner of division, is a career civil servant and a member of Indian Administrative Service who serves as the administrator of a division of a state in India. The post is referred to as regional commissioner in Karnataka and as revenue divisional commissioner in Odisha.

The division is constituted to oversee land revenue administration in the districts under its jurisdiction, along with other administrative functions. The Divisional Commissioner supervises land revenue administration and also oversees functions such as elections, disaster management, and inter-departmental coordination.

Office-bearers are generally either of the ranks of secretary to the state government, or principal secretary to state government.

The role of a divisional commissioner's office is to act as the administrative head of all the state government offices situated in the division. A divisional commissioner is given the direct responsibility of administering the land revenue collection, canal revenue collection and law & order maintenance of a division. The divisional commissioner also presides over Local government institutions in the division. Officers are transferred to and from the post by the state government. This post exists in many states of India. Divisional commissioners are responsible for general administration of the division and planned development of the districts under his control and also act as appeal adalat for revenue cases.

== History of divisional commissioner ==
The division as an administrative level came into being in 1829 by the East India Company to facilitate the administration of far flung districts as a result of an increase in the scope of operations corresponding to the expansion of British territories. Each division was put under the charge of a divisional commissioner. The position was also known as Commissioner of Revenue and Circuit Division because he was the presiding officer of circuit court, it had appellate jurisdiction over sessions court. The post was created by then the Bengal government. The institution of divisional commissioner was created by Lord William Bentinck.

The appointment of commissioners in the subsequently acquired provinces of Punjab, Burma, Oudh and the Central Provinces followed in due course. The commissioner had intermediary role between district collector and board of revenue.

The Royal Commission for Decentralisation, 1907 recommended its retention. The issue, however, continued to crop up again and again, particularly at the time of constitutional reforms of 1919, 1935, and 1947. After independence, the state governments merely tinkered with traditional revenue set-up and the states of Maharashtra, Rajasthan, and Gujarat abolished the posts of divisional commissioners but later revived them except in Gujarat.

== Role of divisional commissioner ==
The roles and powers of commissioners vary from state to state but there is a general precedent. The divisional commissioner performs a variety of roles in regional administration. Today, district magistrates are quite junior officers, needing the guidance and supervision of a seasoned administrator like the divisional commissioner. During the British period, a member of the Indian Civil Service was normally appointed a collector of the district in his twelfth year of service. Today a member of the IAS becomes a district collector after putting in 5 or 6 years of service. With his or her insufficient administrative experience, a district collector of today necessarily needs guidance. The divisional commissioners, therefore, are a necessary part of the governmental machinery.

== Exception ==
The states and union territories in India that do not have divisions and thus do not have divisional commissioners are as follows:

- Kerala
- Goa
- Tamil Nadu
- Andhra Pradesh
- Telangana
- Gujarat
- Manipur
- Mizoram
- Sikkim
- Lakshadweep (Union Territory)
- Chandigarh (Union Territory)
- Dadra and Nagar Haveli and Daman and Diu (Union Territory)
- Assam

In these areas, administrative divisions are not established, and hence the role of a divisional commissioner, who typically oversees revenue administration at the divisional level, does not exist. The district administration reports to the revenue department of the government.

== Bibliography ==
- Singh, G.P. (1993). Revenue administration in India: A case study of Bihar. Delhi: Mittal Publications. ISBN 978-8170993810.
- Maheshwari, S.R. (2000). Indian Administration (6th ed.). New Delhi: Orient Blackswan Private Ltd. ISBN 9788125019886.
- Laxmikanth, M. (2014). Governance in India (2nd ed.). Noida: McGraw Hill Education. ISBN 978-9339204785.
