= Basukinath =

- temple town
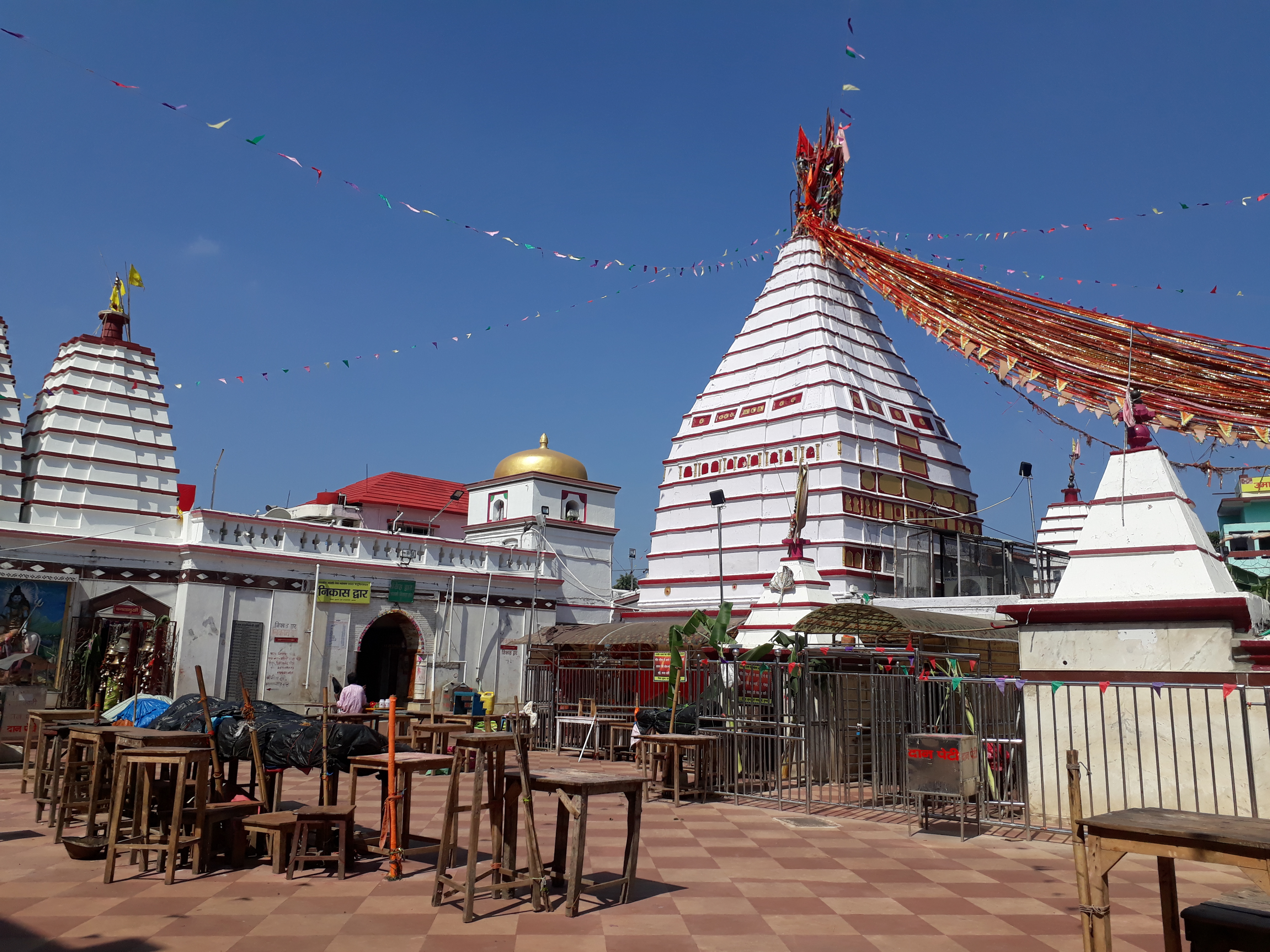

- Location in Jharkhand, India Basukinath (India)
- Coordinates: 24.39°N 87.08°E
- Country: India
- State: Jharkhand
- District: Dumka

Population (2011)
  - Total: 17,123

Language
  - Official: Hindi
  - Regional: Angika
- Time zone: UTC+5:30 (IST)
- Vehicle registration: JH
- Website: dumka.nic.in

Basukinath is a temple town and notified area in the Dumka, Jharkhand, India.

== Geography ==
Cities, towns and locations in the Deoghar, Dumka and Jamtara districts in Santhal Pargana Division
M: Municipality, CT: census town, R: Rural/ Urban centre, D: Dam,
Owing to space constraints in the small map, the actual locations in a larger map may vary slightly

=== Area ===
Basukinath has an area of 19.90 hectares (49.2 acres).

=== Overview ===
The map shows a large area, which is a plateau with low hills, except in the eastern portion where the Rajmahal hills intrude into this area and the Ramgarh hills are there. The south-western portion is just a rolling upland. The entire area is overwhelmingly rural with only small pockets of urbanisation.

== Demographics ==
According to the 2011 Census of India, Basukinath had a total population of 17,123, of which 8,861 (52%) were males and 8,262 (48%) were females. Population in the age range 0–6 years was 2,701. The total number of literate persons in Basukinath was 14,422 (68.41% of the population over 6 years).

As of the 2001 Indian census, Basukinath has a population of 14,119 (52% men, 48% women). Basukinath has an average literacy rate of 54%, which is lower than the national average of 59.5%; with 62% of men and 38% of women literate. 17% of the population is under 6 years of age.

== Infrastructure ==
According to the District Census Handbook 2011, Dumka, Basukinath covered an area of 17.23 km^{2}. Among the civic amenities, it had 46 km roads with both open and closed drains, the protected water supply involved hand pump, uncovered well. It had 2,094 domestic electric connections, 300 road lighting points. Among the medical facilities, it had 3 hospitals, 2 dispensaries, 2 health centres, 1 family welfare centre, 1 maternity and child welfare centre, 1 nursing home, 4 charitable hospital/ nursing homes, 1 veterinary hospital, 20 medicine shops. Among the educational facilities it had 15 primary schools, 6 middle schools, 2 secondary schools, 2 senior secondary schools, 1 general degree college. It had 1 non-formal education centre (Sarba Shiksha Abhiyan). Among the social, cultural and recreational facilities it had 4 auditorium/ public halls, 1 public library, 1 reading room. Three important items it produced were sweets, iron goods, chira. It had the branch offices of 3 nationalised banks, 1 cooperative bank, 1 agricultural credit society.

== Religion ==
Basukinath serves as a place of pilgrimage for Hindus. Baba Basukinath Temple is the main attraction and situated along the Jasidih Dumka New Railway Line. It is one of three major Shiva temples in Bihar and Jharkhand together with Ajgaibinath temple and Baidyanath temple.

Shree Baba Basukinath Shivlinga is Swayambhu Shivlinga. It is named after a farmer Basu who was a great devotee of Lord Shiva and long ago when the Area of Basukinath then called Daruk forest was facing drought, Basu with his devotion pleased Shiva to reside in Basukinath area to bring rains. Vardani Nath is also a Swayambhu Shivlinga and located at a distance of 6 km from Basukinath Mandir.

In the temple premises of Basukinath Mandir there are many gods residing including Lord Ganesha, Swami Kartikeya, Maiya Parvati, Maiya Kali, Anand Bhairav, Maa Annapurna, Maa Ambe, Shree Ram Darbar, Maa Tara, Maa Kamala, Maa Chinnamastika, Maa Baglamukhi, Lord Hanumana and Many more.

Devotees of Shree Basukinath greet each other by saying "Bam Basuki".

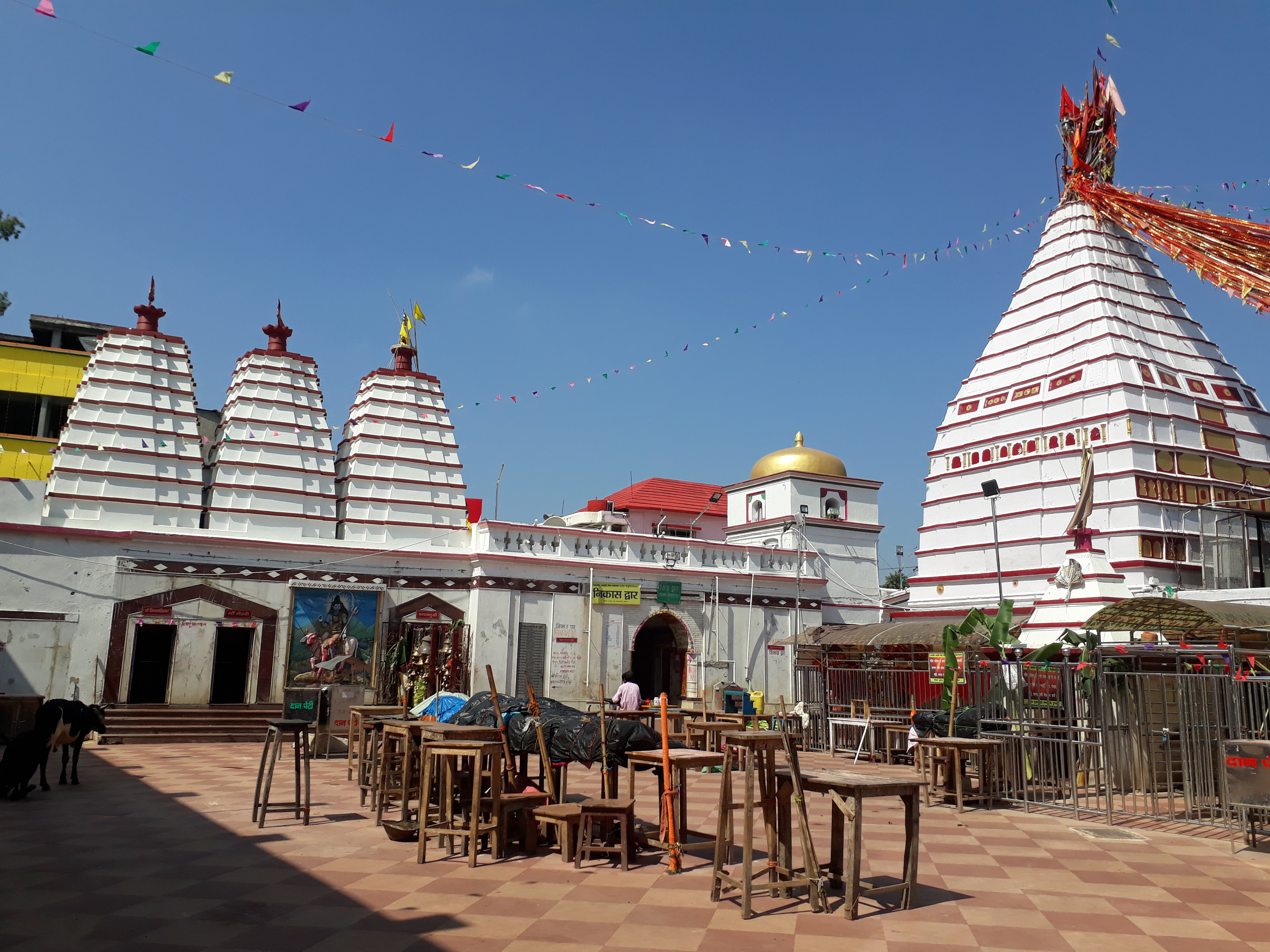
Baba Basukinath Temple complex at Basukinath

=== Shravani Mela ===
Basukinath is famous for the mela of Shraavana (a month of the Hindu calendar), between July and August. Some pilgrims are called "Bol Bam" when they pour holy water on the shivling after 4–5 days of journeying. The pilgrims en route to Basukinath also visit the Baidyanath Jyotirlinga in Deoghar. Shree Baba Basukinath Mitra Mandal (Howrah) headed by Shree Manoj Kedia has been offering Ganga water by taking Kanwar to the Basukinath Linga from 1992 in Shravan Month. Kanwar Yatra can be started from the ghats of Ganges in Bhagalpur and Sultangunj.

== Ram Janki Vivah Utsav ==
Pandit Nainalal Jha and Pradhan Tirth Purohit Baba Basukinath started the festival of "Ram Janki Vivah Utsav" in Basukinath. A baraat which included elephants and horses participated in the procession as well.
