= MPY =

MPY or mpy may refer to:

- MPY, the IATA code for Maripasoula Airport, French Guiana
- MPY, the Indian Railways station code for Murarpur railway station, Bihar, India
- mpy, the ISO 639-3 code for Mapia language, Indonesia
