= Kanwar Yatra =

Hindu pilgrimage to the Ganges River

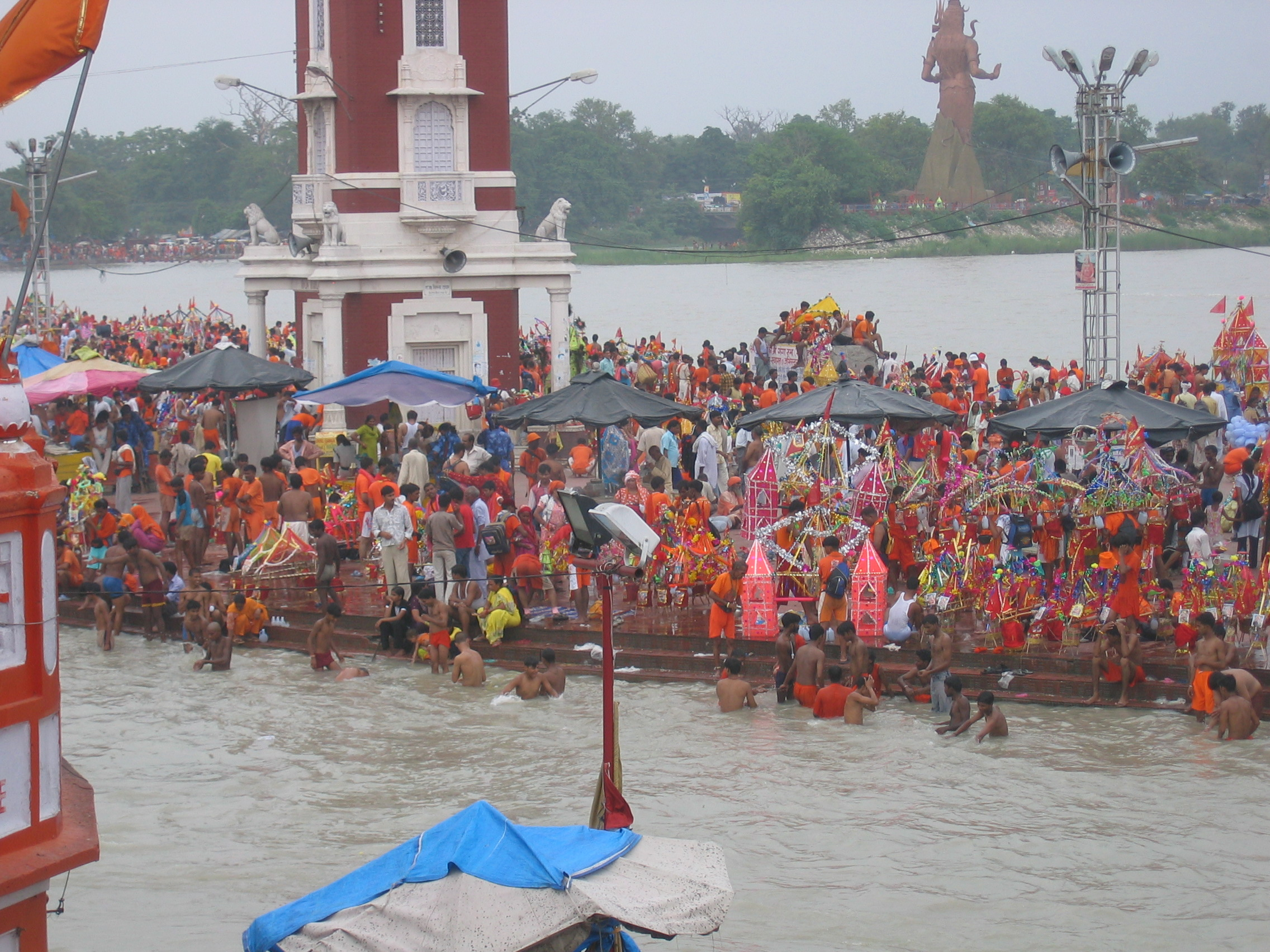
Har ki Pauri, thronged by Kanwarias, during the Kavad Mela, Haridwar.

The Kanwar Yātrā (Devanagari: कांवड़ यात्रा; also Kānvar or Kāvaḍ Yātrā) is an annual pilgrimage of devotees of Shiva, known as Kānvarias (Devanagari: कावड़िया) or "Bhole" (भोले), to Hindu pilgrimage places of Haridwar, Gaumukh and Gangotri (Uttarakhand) and Ajgaibinath Temple in Sultanganj, Bhagalpur (Bihar) in order to fetch holy waters from the Ganges River. Millions of pilgrims fetch sacred water from river Ganga and carry on their shoulders for hundreds of miles to offer it in their local Shiva shrines, or specific temples such as Pura Mahadeva temple in Baghpat and Augharnath temple in Meerut, Kashi Vishwanath temple in Varanasi, Baidyanath temple in Deoghar, etc.

The Kanwar Yatra is typically held from the starting of Hindu Sawan Month, to the day of Shivratri. Kanwar refers to a genre of religious performances where devotees ritually carry water of the Ganges River from holy places like Gaumukh or Haridwar in Uttarakhand in containers suspended on either side of a pole. The pilgrimage derives its name from a sacred water carrying apparatus, called kanwar, and while the source of the water is often the Ganga, it can also be its local equivalents. The offering is dedicated to Shiva, often addressed as Bhola (innocent) or Bhole Baba (innocent saint).

The yatra used to be a small affair undertaken by a few saints and older devotees until the late 1980s, when it started gaining popularity. Today, the kanwar pilgrimage to Haridwar in particular has grown to be India's largest annual religious gathering, with an estimated 30 million devotees in the 2023 and 2024 events. The devotees come from the surrounding states of Delhi, Uttar Pradesh, Haryana, Rajasthan, Punjab, Bihar and some from Jharkhand, Chhattisgarh, Odisha and Madhya Pradesh. Heavy security measures are undertaken by the government and the traffic on Delhi-Haridwar national highway (NH-58) is diverted for the period.

== Practice ==
Kanwar Yatra is named after the kānvale pole (usually made of bamboo) with two roughly equal loads fastened or dangling from opposite ends. The kānvar is carried by balancing the middle of the pole on one or both shoulders. The Hindi word kānvar is derived from the Sanskrit kānvānrathi (काँवाँरथी). Kānvar-carrying pilgrims, called Kānvariās, carry covered water-pots in kānvars slung across their shoulders. This practice of carrying Kavad as a part of religious pilgrimage, especially by devotees of Lord Shiva, is widely followed throughout India (see: Kavadi). Yatra means a journey or procession.

== History ==
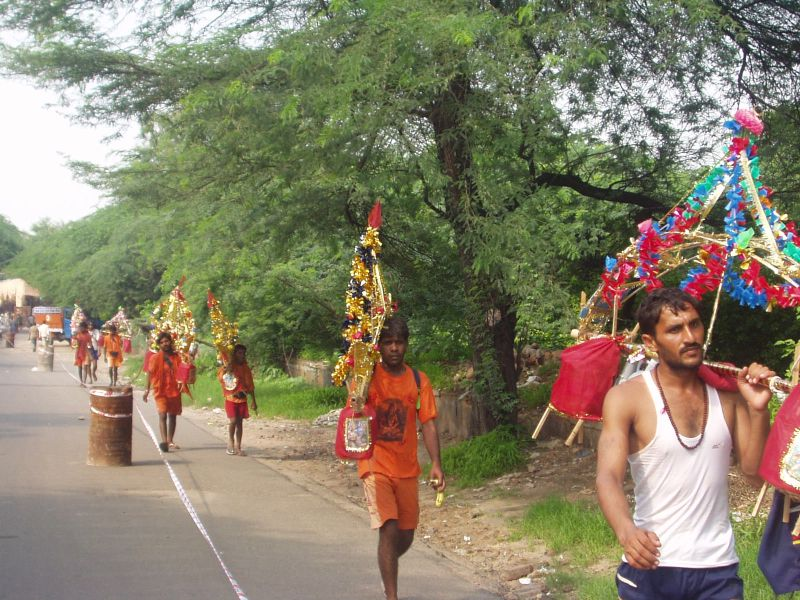
Bhole carrying kawar

According to Professor Devi Prasad Dubey of the University of Allahabad, the earliest mention of what can be identified as a 'kanwar yatra' (namely carrying load full of water from the river Ganga barefoot for conducting water abhisheka of a famous Shivalinga) can be traced back to the 1700s, when pilgrims would carry Gangajal collected from Sultanganj to pour it at the shrine of Vaidyanath in Deoghar. Before that, it was common for Hindu pilgrims to carry Ganga water barefoot while returning home, out of respect for the river. The phenomenon was too insignificant to be noticed by the British authorities, but it gradually spread among the faithful as an expression of piety.

After the 1960s, 'kanwar yatra' was no longer restricted among ascetics & devotees in rural regions & spread across the urban landscape of the Hindi belt through the patronisation of Marwari businessmen. The yatra saw a massive upsurge in the 1980s due to variety of reasons, like improved road connectivity & the rise of Hindu nationalism centered around the Ram Janmabhoomi movement.

=== Contemporary events ===
In 2018, there were multiple incidents of violence and vandalism associated with Kanwar Yatra in National Capital Region and Uttar Pradesh. The Supreme Court of India made harsh remarks on such incidents.

In the year 2020, Kanwar Yatra was cancelled due to the COVID-19 pandemic in India. In 2021, Uttarakhand decided to suspend the yatra in light of the second wave of COVID-19 in the country India. However, Uttar Pradesh decided to move ahead with the yatra and Supreme Court of India took a case on its own motion regarding the matter.

== Bol Bam ==
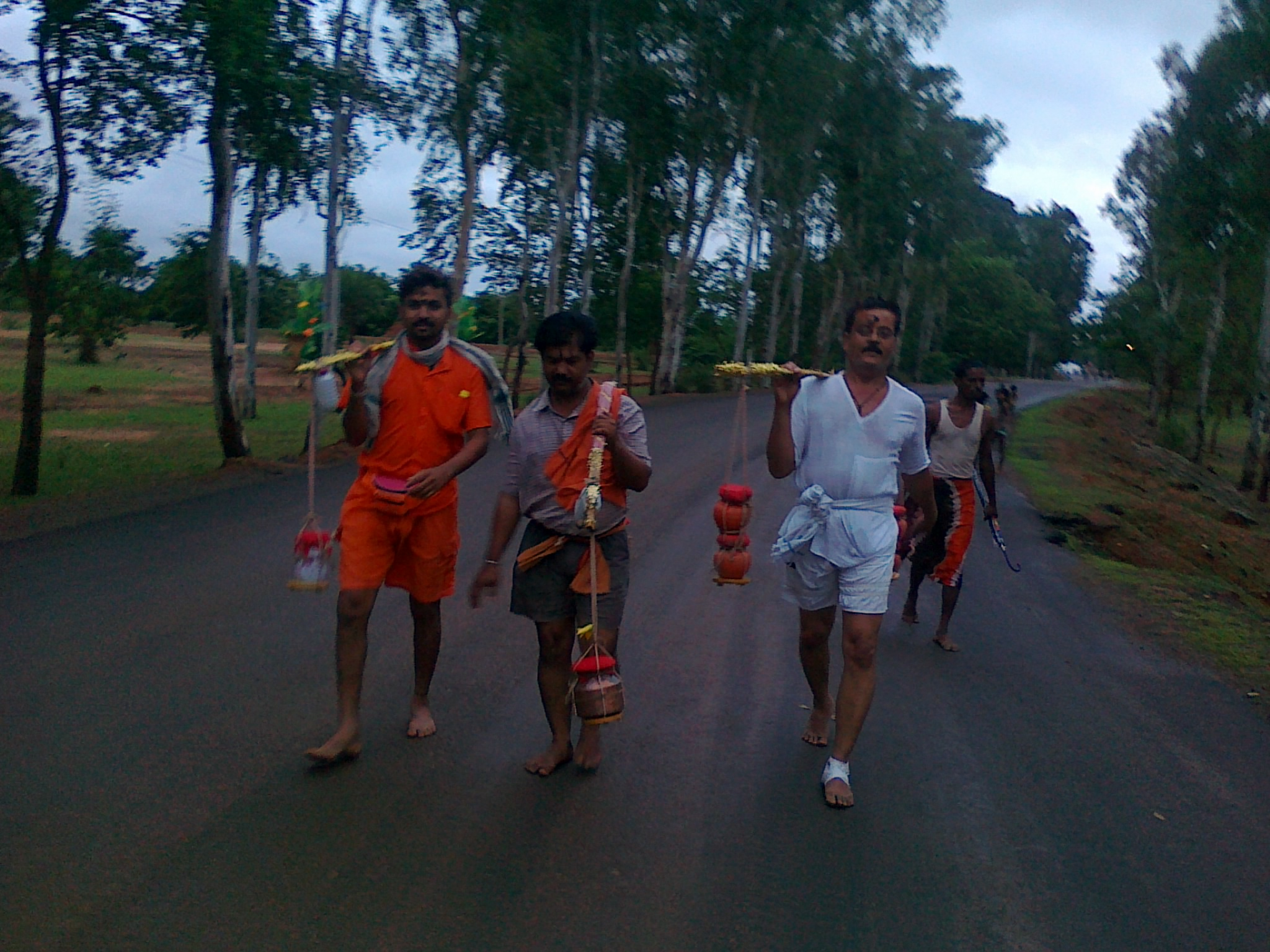
Bol Bam

Bol-Bamrefers to pilgrimages and festivals in India and Nepal glorifying Shiva. The festivals run during the monsoon month Shraawan (July — August). After taking water from the Ganges river (or other nearby river that wind up in the Ganges) the pilgrims, known as kanwariya or Shiv Bhaktas (devotees of Shiva), are mandated to travel barefooted and in saffron robes with their kanwar (walking sticks used to hang the urns of water) for 105 km by various routes and usually in groups made of family, friends and or neighbours, and return to their own local or other more prestigious and larger Shiva Temples to pour Gangajal on Lord Shiva (Shiv Linga).

== The Yatra ==
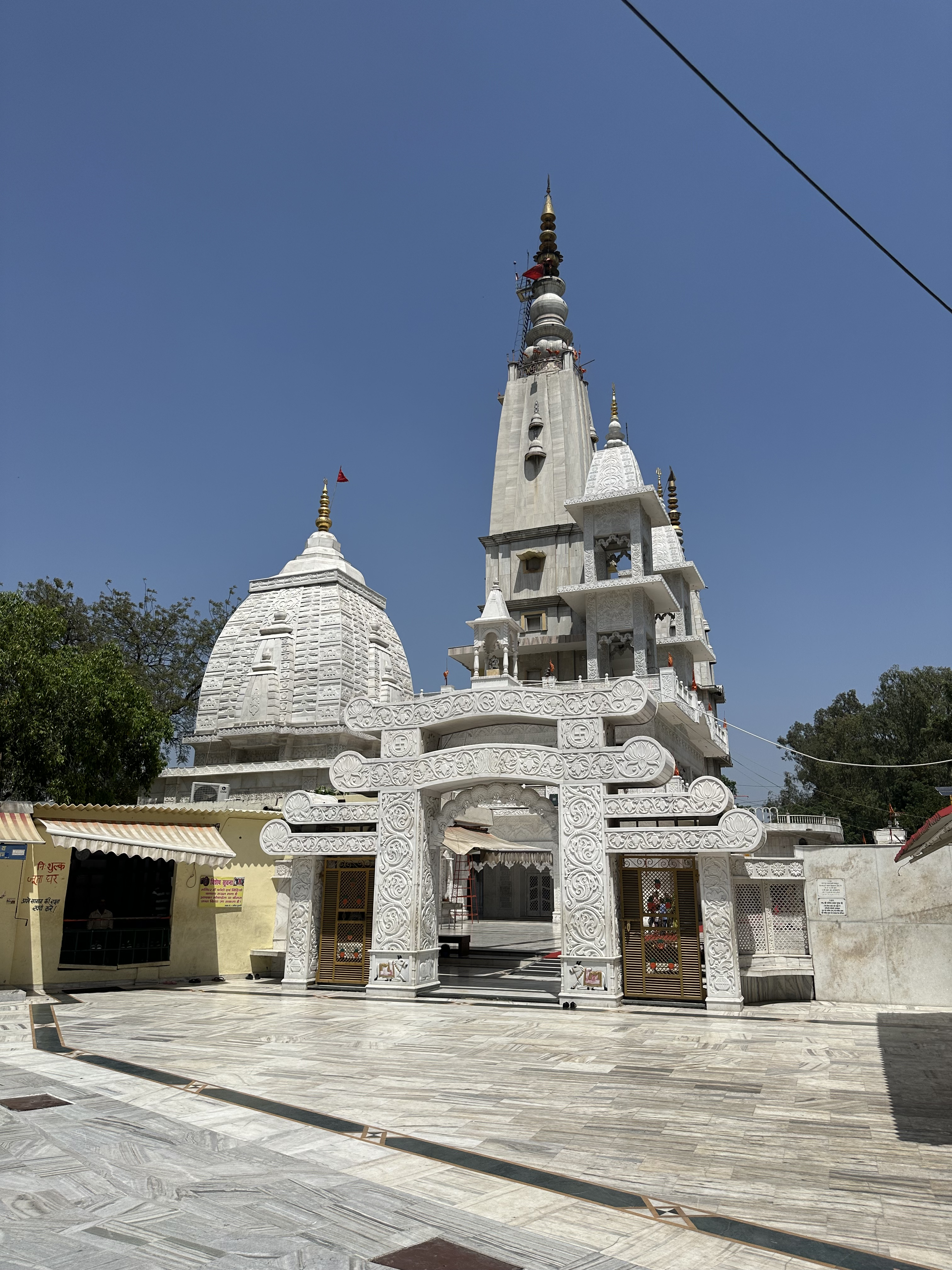
Augarnath Temple, one of the principal shrines of offerings

The month of Shraavana is dedicated to Lord Shiva and most devotees observe a fast on Mondays during the month, as it also falls during the chaturmas period, traditionally set aside for religious pilgrimages, bathing in holy rivers and penance. During the annual Monsoon season thousands of saffron-clad pilgrims carrying water from the Ganges in Haridwar, Gangotri or Gaumukh, the glacier from where the Ganges originates and other holy places on the Ganges, like Sultanganj, the only place where the river turns north during its course, and return to their hometowns, where they later perform abhisheka (anointing) the Shivalingas at the local Shiva temples, as a gesture of thanksgiving.

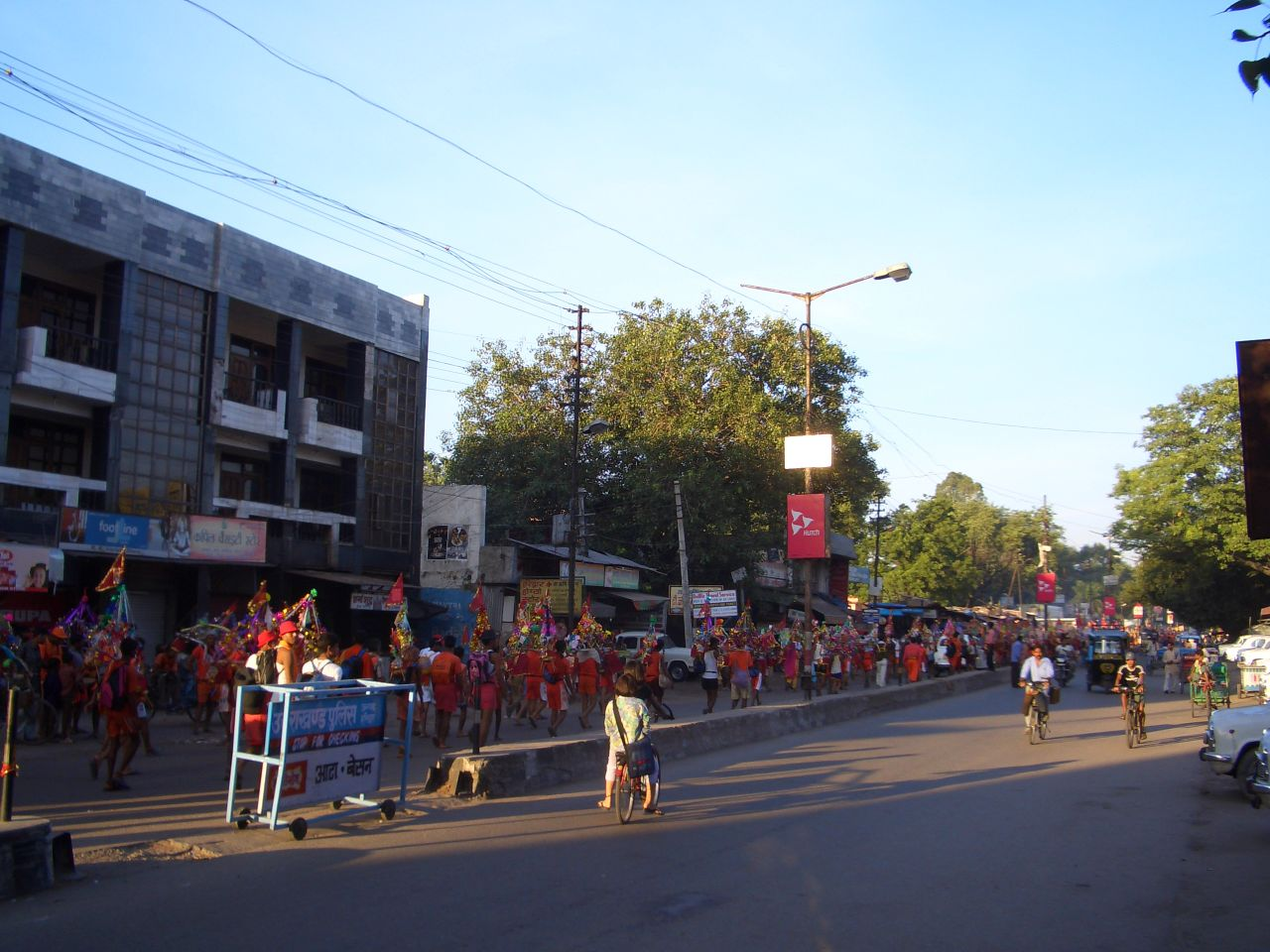
Kanwarias in Haridwar, 2007

While most pilgrims are men, a few women also participate in yatra. Most travel the distance on foot, a few also travel on bicycles, motor cycles, scooters, mini trucks or jeeps. Numerous Hindu organizations and other voluntary organizations like local Kanwar Sanghs, the Rashtriya Swayamsevak Sangh and the Vishwa Hindu Parishad setup camps along the National Highways during the yatra, where food, shelter, medical-aid and stand to hang the Kanvads, holding the Ganges water is provided.

Smaller pilgrimages are also undertaken to places like Prayagraj and Varanasi. Shravani Mela is a major festival at Deoghar in Jharkhand, where thousands of saffron-clad pilgrims bringing holy water, from the Ganges at Sultanganj, covering a distance of 105 kilometres on foot.

== See also ==
- Famous Hindu yatras
- Hindu pilgrimage sites in India
- List of Hindu festivals
- Padayatra
- Ratha Yatra
- Tirtha
- Tirtha and Kshetra
