= Sultanganj Buddha =

Copper Buddha figure from India

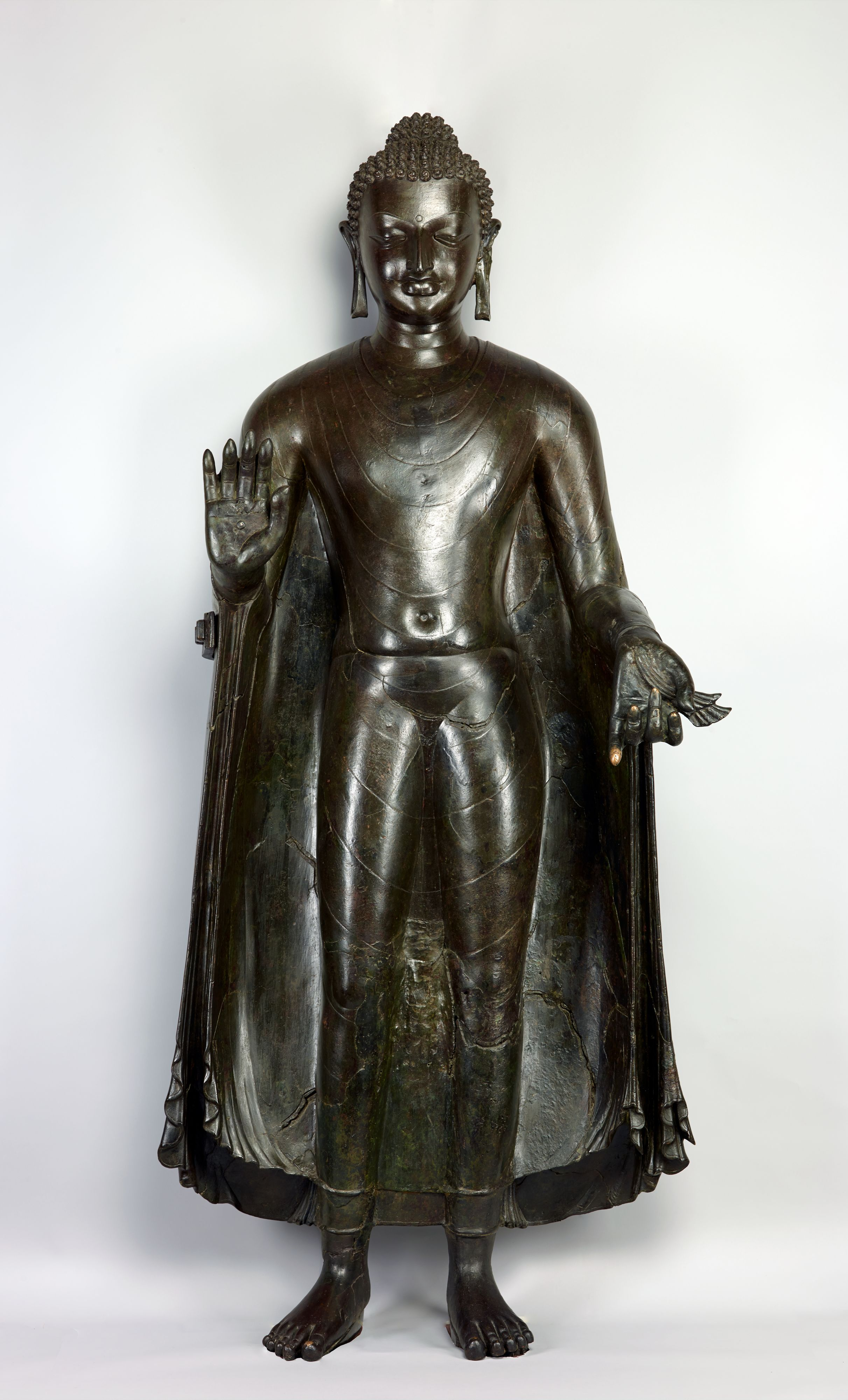
- Year: 500–700 AD
- Medium: Copper
- Movement: Gupta–Pala transitional period
- Dimensions: 2.3 m × 1 m (91 in × 39 in)
- Location: Birmingham Museum and Art Gallery, Birmingham

The Sultanganj Buddha is a Gupta–Pala transitional period sculpture, the largest substantially complete copper Buddha figure known from the time. The statue is dated to between 500 and 700 AD (but see below). It is 2.3 m high and 1 m wide, with a weight over 500 kg. It was found in the East Indian town of Sultanganj, Bhagalpur district, Bihar in 1861 during the construction of the East Indian Railway. It is now in the Birmingham Museum and Art Gallery, Birmingham, England.

Over life-size, this is "the only remaining metal statue of any size" from Gupta art, out of what was at the time probably approximately as numerous a type as stone or stucco statues. The metal Brahma from Mirpur-Khas is older, but about half the size. The Jain Akota bronzes and some other finds are much smaller still, probably figures for shrines in well-off homes.

In Lalitpur, Nepal the Guita Bahī monastery has a copper Buddha about 1.8 metres tall, of Nepali make and style, of about the 9th or 10th century. This remains in place, and in worship, against a wall at the end of a shrine or prayer-hall, and the Sultanganj Buddha was probably originally placed in a similar location.

The style of the Sultanganj figure is comparable to slightly earlier stone Buddha figures from Sarnath in "the smoothly rounded attenuation of body and limbs" and the very thin, clinging body garment, indicated in the lightest of ways. The figure has "a feeling of animation imparted by the unbalanced stance and the movement suggested by the sweeping silhouette of the enveloping robe".

== Description ==
The Sultanganj Buddha was cast in pure, unrefined copper by the cire perdue, or lost wax, technique. Inside there is a clay body, mixed with rice husks that allowed radiocarbon dating. The figure stands in the "Fearless Posture", with his right hand raised in abhayamudra (a gesture of reassurance or protection), and his left hand is held downwards with palm outwards, said to indicate granting a favour. The end of the monastic robe is held between the thumb and forefinger of this hand in the manner that is still practised by Theravadin monks.

The surface of the metal is now dark, and "displays over much of its surface a black encrustation of fine clay minerals, which are the result of the long period exposure to atmospheric agents and the burial", except where museum visitors had touched the fingers of the proper left hand, wearing away this coating and leaving at least their tips brightly polished and light and gold-like in colour. It is probable that this was the original appearance of the whole surface except the hair, achieved by intensive polishing after casting, reflecting references in early Buddhist scriptures to the radiance and colour of the Buddha's body. Other Buddha images were gilded.

The sheer size of the statue meant that "the workshop which was in charge of casting the ‘Sultanganj Buddha’ worked at the limit of its technical capabilities", and various stages of repairs and a "secondary casting" (at a rather lower level of skill) were carried out to complete and perhaps maintain the statue.

== Date ==
The sculpture was originally dated to the Gupta period, Vincent Arthur Smith specifying around 400 in a book of 1911. Then dates as late as 800 came to be preferred. The results of the radiocarbon dating suggest 600–650, though the museum still prefers "500–700".

== Discovery and later history ==
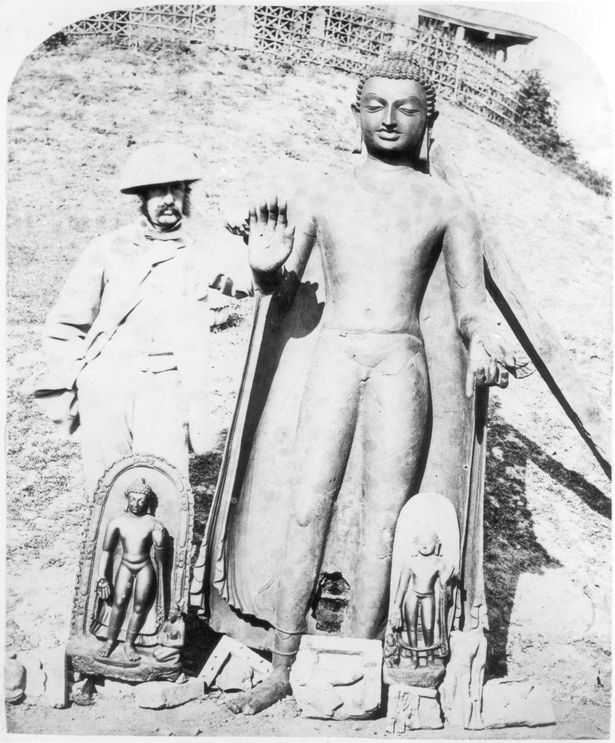
E. B. Harris with the Sultanganj Buddha. 1861/1862

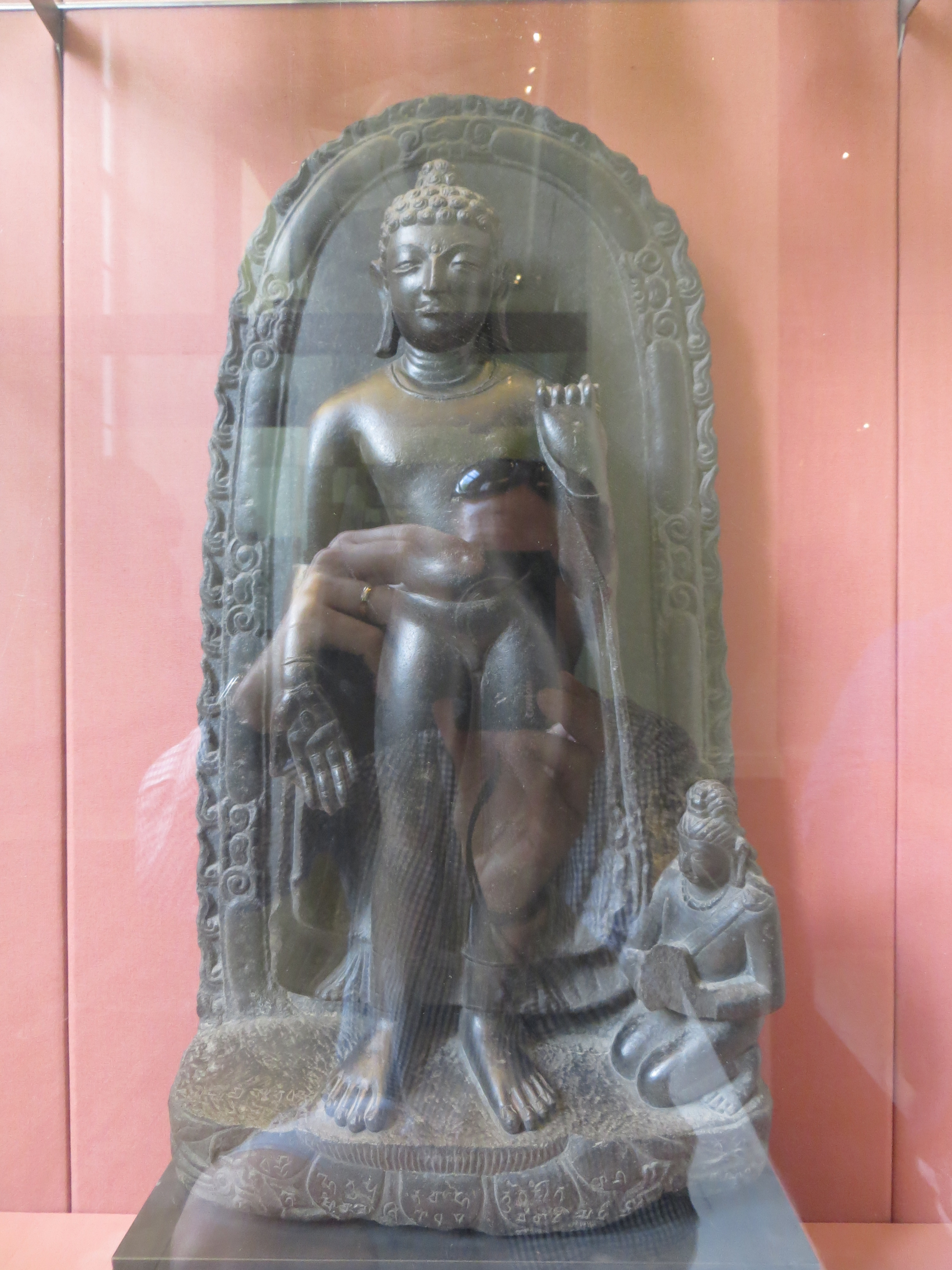
Stone statue of Buddha from Sultanganj in the British Museum, at left in the photo above. Ye Dharma Hetu inscribed on the lotus base (magnify to see).

E. B. Harris, the railway engineer who discovered the Buddha during excavations that he carried out on ancient remains near the Sultanganj station that he was constructing, published a detailed account of his work, complete with a site plan and photographs. He describes finding the right foot of the Buddha ten feet under the surface, beneath a floor he considered to have been used to conceal the statue after it had been toppled from its former place. Harris sent the statue to Birmingham, the cost of its transport to England being paid by Samuel Thornton, a Birmingham manufacturer of ironmongery. Thornton, himself a former mayor of Birmingham, offered it to the Borough Council for their proposed Art Museum in 1864. In Birmingham, a town that boasted a thousand trades, the Art Museum was intended to be an exemplar and inspiration for local metalworkers and other artisans.

Over the years, it has been shown in a number of prominent locations throughout Birmingham Museum and Art Gallery (BMAG) and remains an indispensable display item. It was the foundation donation to the collections and is BMAG's most treasured possession. Harris's report shows him with the Buddha and a number of smaller finds. They included two much smaller standing Buddhas in stone: one is now in the British Museum and the other in the Asian Art Museum of San Francisco. A stone Buddha head, also from Sultanganj, is now in the Victoria and Albert Museum, London.

From 1998 to 2015, the Buddha was the centrepiece of a gallery at Birmingham Museum and Art Gallery dedicated to displaying a number of Buddhas and related artefacts, and Birmingham Museum held an annual 'Buddha Day', when West Midlands-based Buddhist groups from a range of traditions would bless the statue.

During 2015, Birmingham Museum and Art Gallery worked with representatives of a number of faith groups from the city on the creation of a new 'Faith Gallery', and the Sultanganj Buddha was moved from its previous location. It is now displayed in a new gallery that tells the story of the range of faiths that are practiced in Birmingham.

== Gallery ==
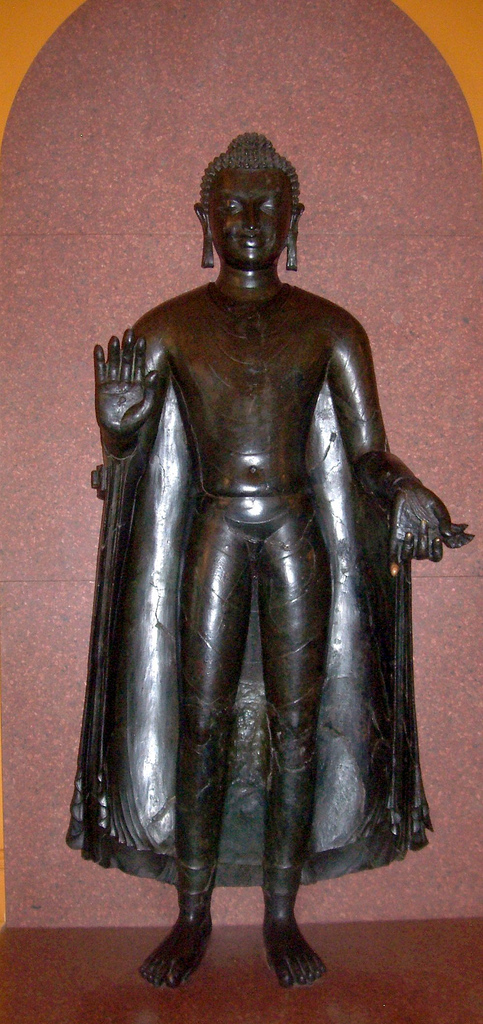
Sultanganj Buddha

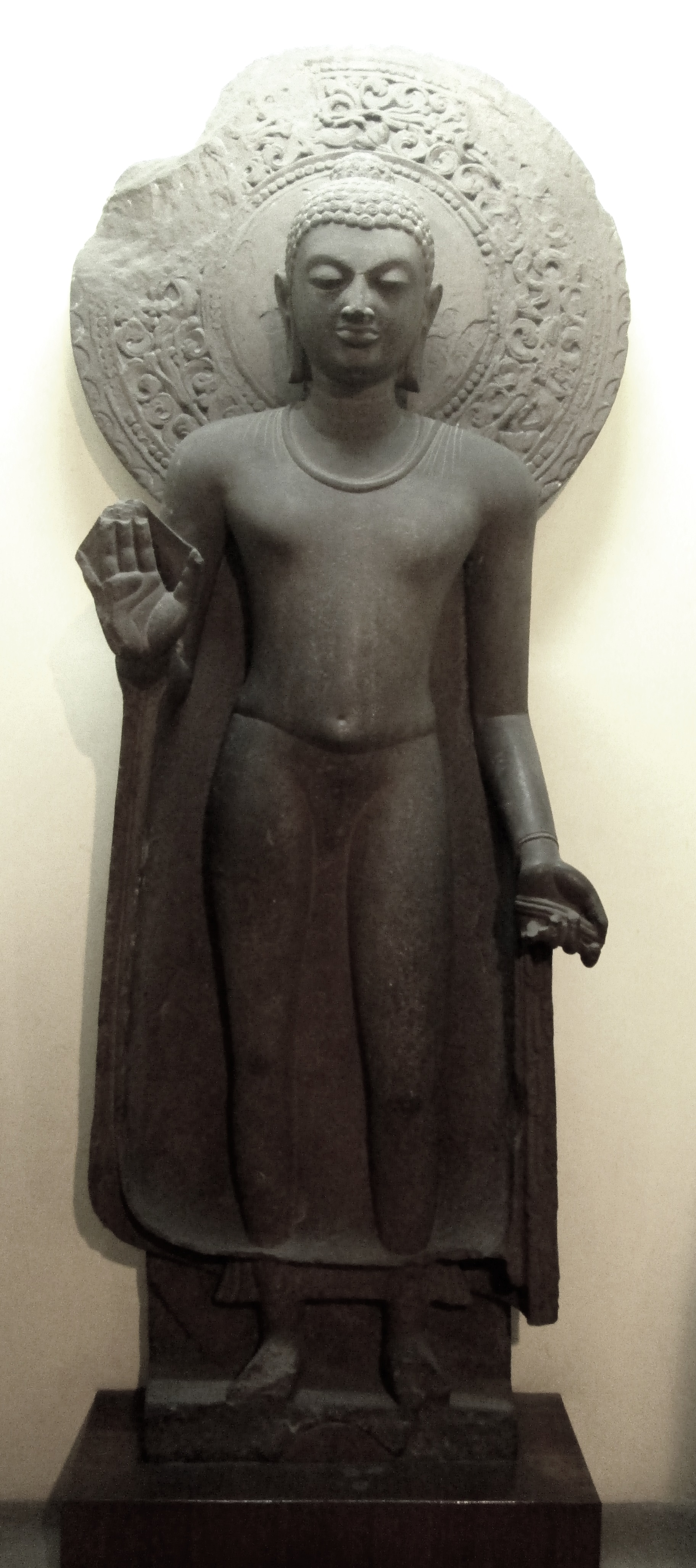
Indian Museum, Kolkata, 5th century, from Sarnath

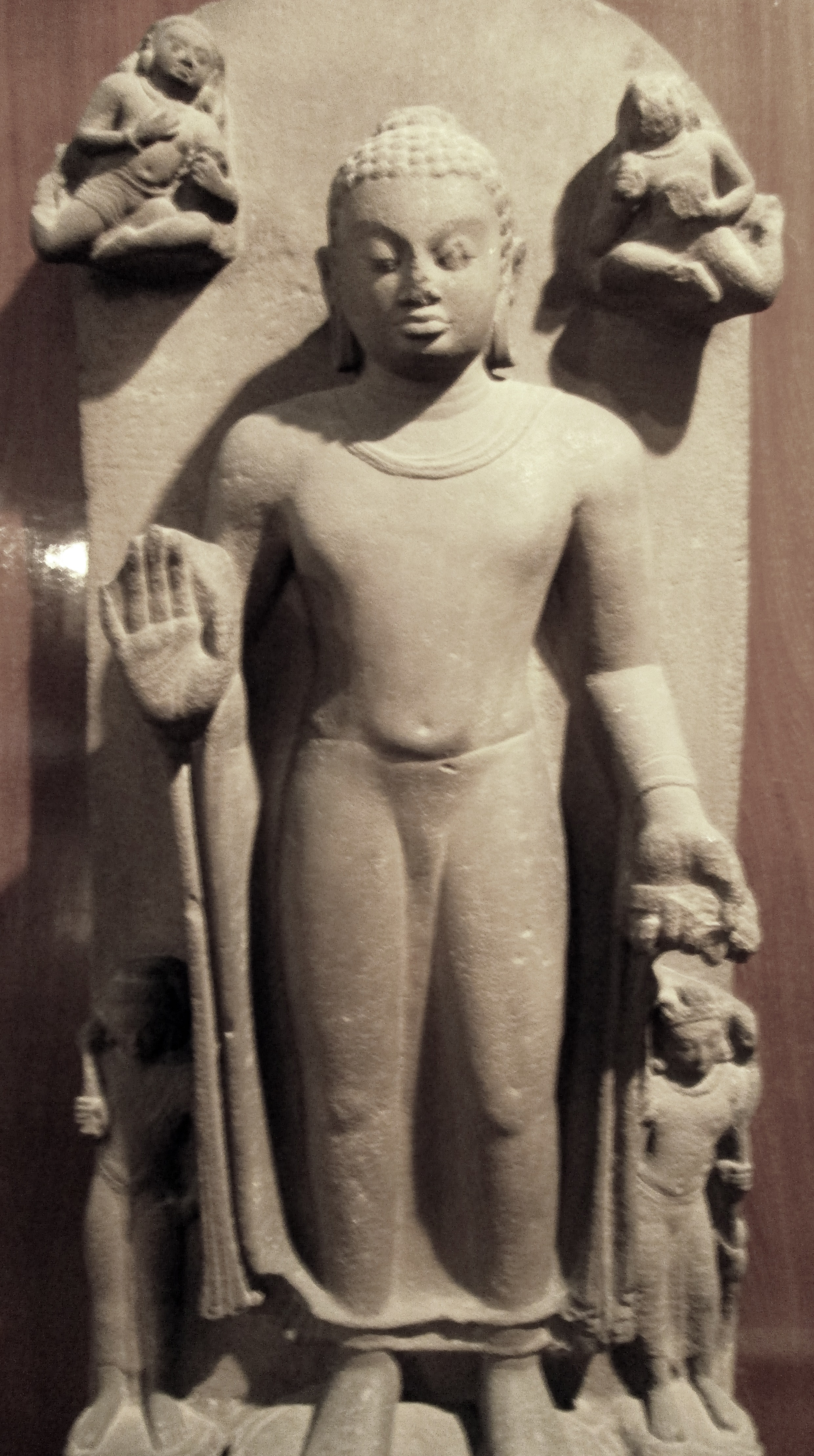
Indian Museum, Kolkata, 5th century, from Sarnath

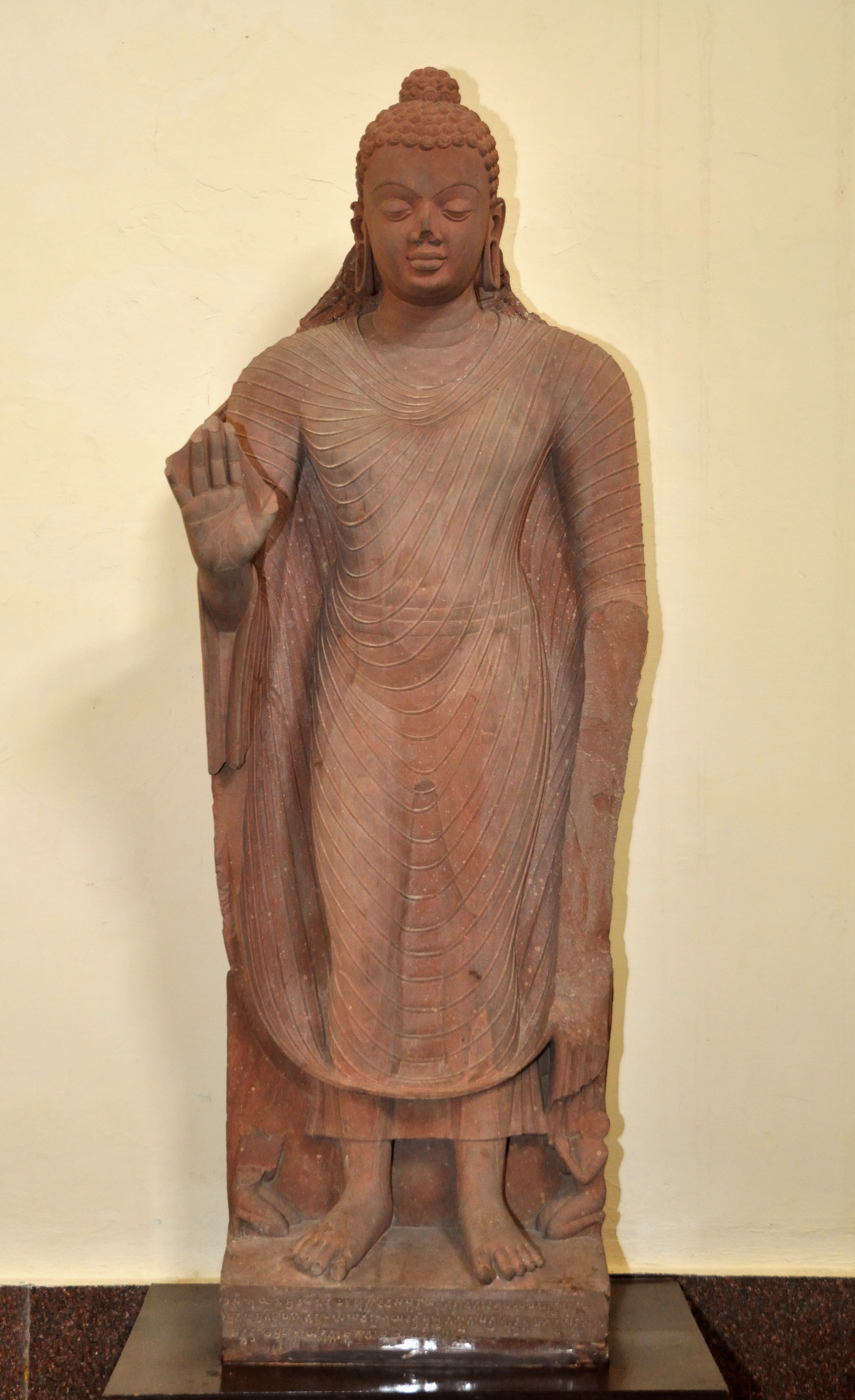
Buddha from Mathura, dated 434
