= Shravani Mela =

Hindu pilgrimage and festivals in India

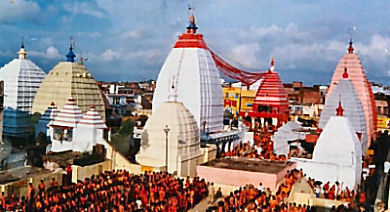
- Devotees at Shravani Mela in Deoghar
- Genre: Pilgrimage
- Frequency: Annually
- Venue: Baidyanath Temple
- Locations: Deoghar, Jharkhand, India
- Coordinates: 24°29′33″N 86°42′00″E
- Participants: 60 Lac+ (2026)
- Patrons: Government of Jharkhand; Government of Bihar

Shravani Mela is a month-long Hindu festival observed in the month of Shravan (July–August) at the Baba Baidyanath Dham temple in Deoghar, Jharkhand, India. This festival is one of the largest religious gatherings in India, attracting millions of devotees, primarily the Kanwariyas, who undertake a pilgrimage to offer holy water from the Ganges to Lord Shiva.

== Significance ==
Shravani Mela is dedicated to Lord Shiva and is considered highly auspicious. The pilgrimage, also known as the Kanwar Yatra, involves devotees collecting water from the Ganges at Ajgaibinath Dham, Sultanganj and carrying it on foot over a distance of approximately 105 km to the Baba Baidyanath temple in Deoghar. The journey symbolizes devotion, penance, and purification.

== Rituals ==
- Devotees, known as Kanwariyas, wear saffron-colored clothes and carry the holy water in pots balanced on a decorated bamboo structure called a Kanwar.
- The pilgrimage starts from Ajgaibinath Dham, Sultanganj, where the Ganges flows northward, making it sacred for collecting water.
- The devotees walk barefoot and are not allowed to place the Kanwar on the ground during the journey.
- Upon reaching Deoghar, they perform Abhishek (ritual bathing) of the Shiva Linga at Baba Baidyanath temple with the sacred water.

== Major Attractions ==
- Baba Baidyanath Temple – One of the twelve Jyotirlingas of Lord Shiva.
- Shivganga Lake – A sacred pond near the temple where devotees take a dip before offering prayers.
- Baba Ajgaibinath Temple- The temple and place where the pilgrims collect water and thus is the start of Shravani Mela.
- Basukinath Temple – A significant temple visited by pilgrims after offering prayers at Baidyanath Dham.

== See also ==
- Kanwar Yatra
- Baba Baidyanath Temple
- Sultanganj
