= Brahma from Mirpur-Khas =

Famous bronze image of Brahma made in Sindh

Brahma from Mirpur Khas
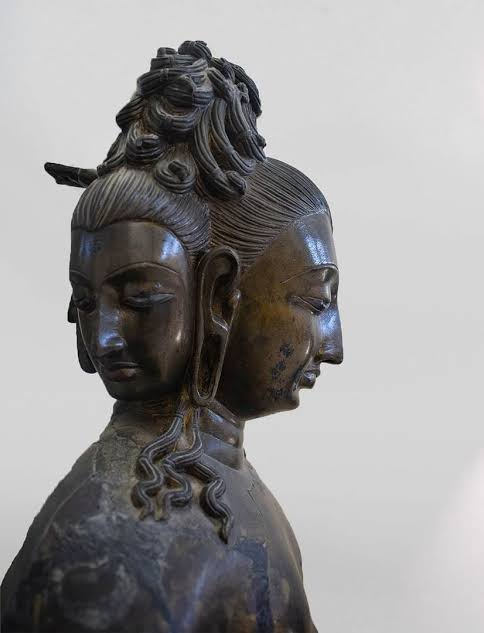
- Brahma from Mirpur Khas on display in the National Museum of Pakistan, Karachi
- Material: Bronze/Copper
- Size: Height: 95 cm Width: 53 cm Depth: 24 cm
- Period/culture: c. 5th or 6th century
- Place: found in Sindh

The Brahma from Mirpur Khas is an important 5th or 6th century bronze or brass statue of the Hindu god Brahma made during the Gupta period in Sindh, in modern Pakistan. It is the earliest known metallic image of Brahma, and the only known representative of the school it represents. It has been described as "an immense artistic creation" of the Gupta period.

It was found in a field near Mirpur-Khas as first reported by Henry Cousens in 1929. Some report it as having been found at Brahmanabad. It is now displayed at The National Museum of Pakistan in Karachi.

Few metal statues this large have survived from Gupta art, and even fewer with a Hindu subject. Descriptions of the material vary, as is often the case with copper alloy objects; it is variously called bronze, brass, copper and gilt bronze. If it was gilded, little of this remains.

== Description ==
Brahma from Mirpur-Khas on the cover of South Asian Archaeology 1975 proceedings

The four-headed Brahma bronze statue has a height over 3 feet. Brahma is normally four-headed in free-standing sculpture, but often three-headed in reliefs. He is shown standing with two hands, wearing a dhoti and a yajnopavita but without any ornaments. Vasudeva Sharana Agrawala calls it "an exceptionally good specimen of the art of metal-casting in this period". Śrīrāma and Śaṅkara Goyala term is "true memorial of Gupta metalsmith's artistic genius". It is said to the best example of Gupta art in Sindh.

The object suggests that Sindh was a major centre of metalworking. The Brahma from Mirpur Khas has been widely used by art historians for comparison with other artwork of historical significance.

== See also ==
- Sultanganj Buddha
- Chausa hoard
- Sant Nenuram Ashram
- Akota Bronzes
- Kahu-Jo-Darro
