= Nathnagar railway station =

Railway station in Bihar, India

Nathnagar
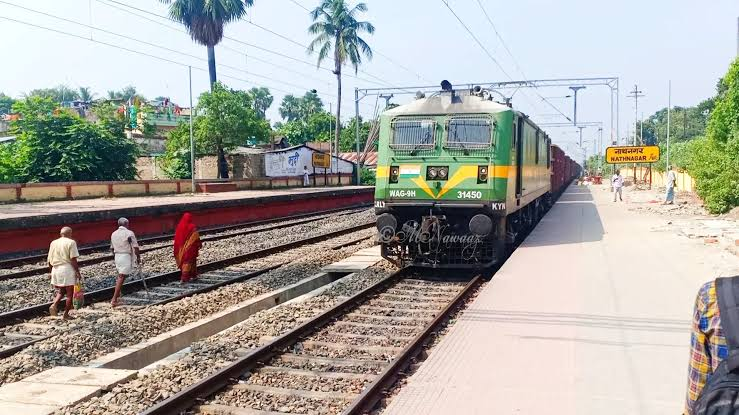

General information
- Location: Champapur, Nathnagar, Bhagalpur City, Bihar; India
- Coordinates: 25°14′13″N 86°56′07″E
- Elevation: 48 m (157 ft)
- System: Passenger train station
- Owner: Indian Railways
- Operator: Eastern Railway zone
- Line: Sahibganj loop line
- Platforms: 2
- Tracks: 4

Construction
- Structure type: Standard (on ground station)

Other information
- Status: Active
- Station code: NAT
- Zone(s): Eastern Railway zone
- Division(s): Malda

History
- Former names: East Indian Railway Company

Services
Preceding station	Indian Railways	Following station
Bhagalpur Junction towards Khana	Eastern Railway zone Sahibganj loop	Murarpur towards Kiul Junction
Location

Nathnagar railway station is a railway station on Sahibganj loop line under the Malda railway division of Eastern Railway zone. It is situated at Champapur, Nathnagar in Bhagalpur city in the Indian state of Bihar.It is 3rd most important railway station After Bhagalpur jn and Sabour in Bhagalpur city.
