= Basukinath Temple =

Hindu temple in Dumka district, Jharkhand

- बासुकिनाथ मंदिर
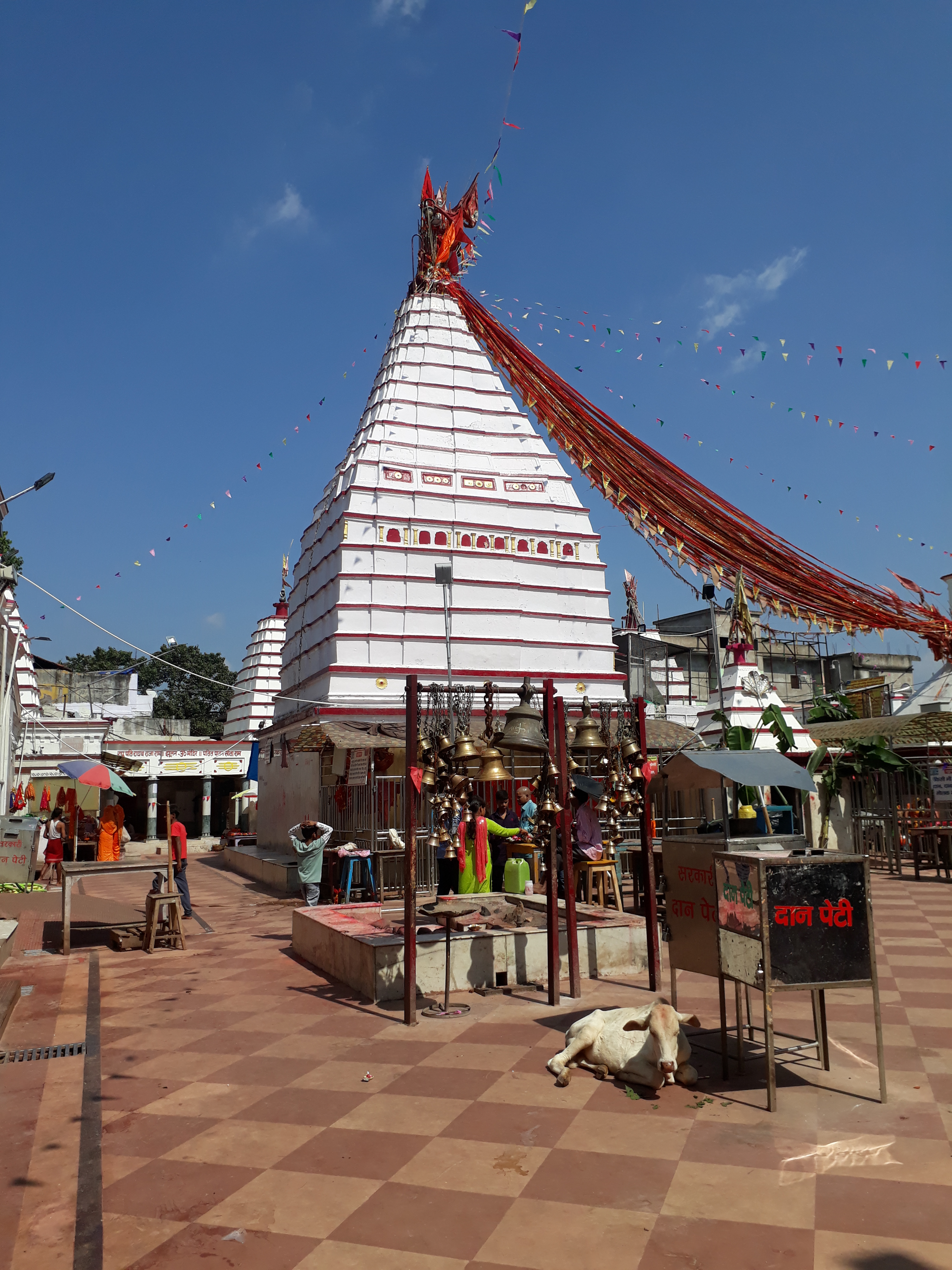
- Pyramid-shaped Shikhara of the temple

- Location in Basukinath, Jharkhand

Religion
- Affiliation: Hinduism
- District: Dumka
- Deity: Shiva
- Festivals: Shravani Mela; Maha Shivaratri

Location
- Location: Basukinath
- State: Jharkhand
- Country: India
- Interactive map of Basukinath Temple
- Coordinates: 24°39′44″N 87°09′09″E

Architecture
- Type: Nagara style
- Temple: 30

Website
- Official website

Basukinath Temple also known as Baba Basukinath Dham is a Hindu temple dedicated to Shiva, located in the town of Basukinath, Dumka district in the Indian state of Jharkhand. It is an important pilgrimage site in eastern India and forms part of the spiritual circuit with Deoghar. Pilgrims visiting Baidyanath Dham in Deoghar typically continue their journey to Basukinath, about 45 km away to offer prayers at the temple. The Basukinath complex contains total of 30 shrines and hosts major festivals such as Shravani Mela and Maha Shivaratri which attract large numbers of devotees annually.
