= Maheshi railway station =

Railway station in Bihar, India

Maheshi

General information
- Location: National Highway 80, Maheshi, Bhagalpur district, Bihar; India
- Coordinates: 25°14′13″N 86°47′57″E
- Elevation: 38 m (125 ft)
- System: Passenger train station
- Owner: Indian Railways
- Operator: Eastern Railway zone
- Line: Sahibganj loop line
- Platforms: 2
- Tracks: 2

Construction
- Structure type: Standard (on ground station)

Other information
- Status: Active
- Station code: MVV
- Zone(s): Eastern Railway zone
- Division(s): Malda

History
- Former names: East Indian Railway Company

Services
Preceding station	Indian Railways	Following station
Akbarnagar towards Khana	Eastern Railway zone Sahibganj loop	Abjuganj towards Kiul Junction
Location

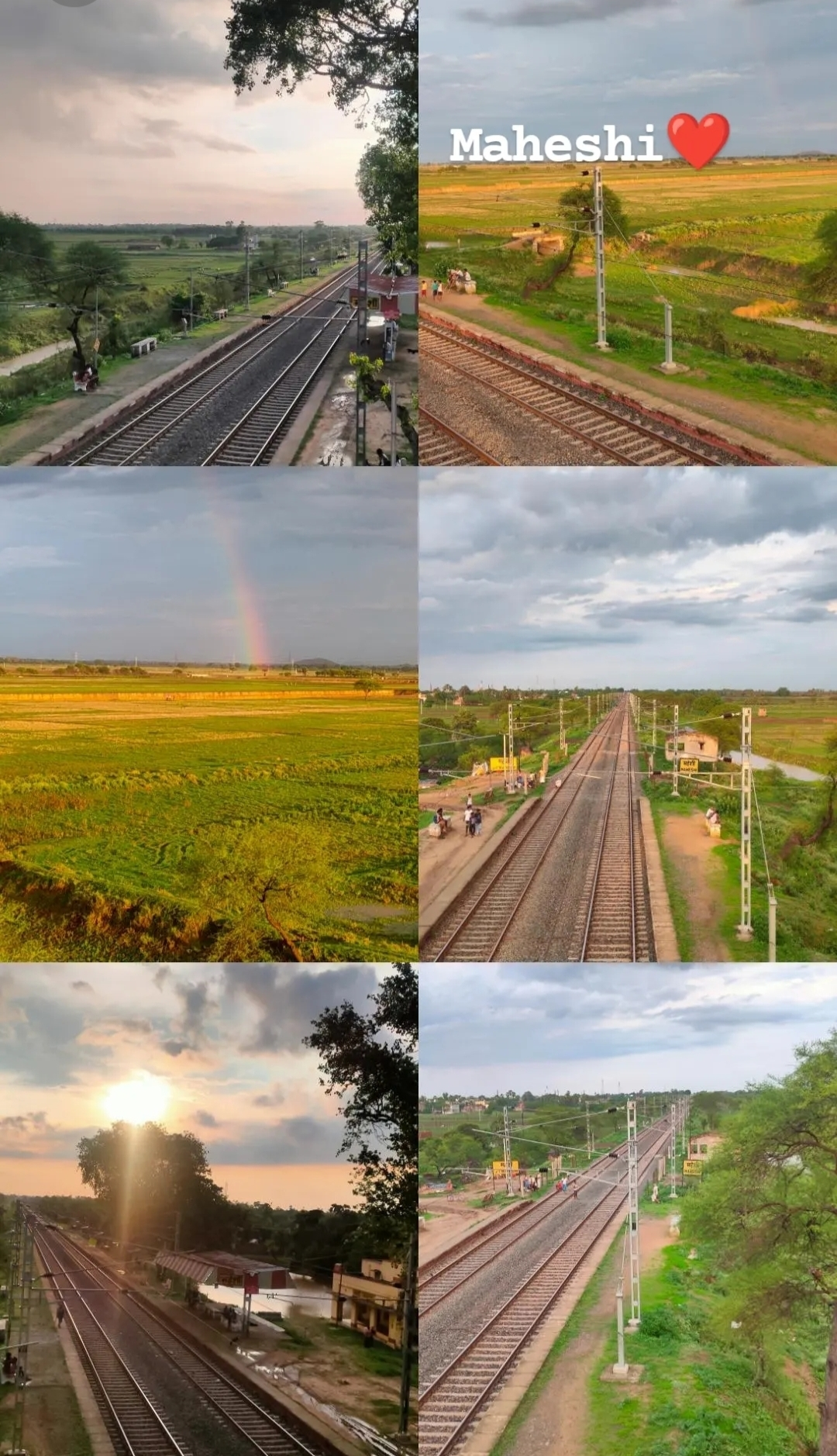

Maheshi railway station is a railway station on Sahibganj loop line under the Malda railway division of Eastern Railway zone. It is situated beside National Highway 80 at Maheshi in Bhagalpur district in the Indian state of Bihar.
