= Ajgaibinath Dham =

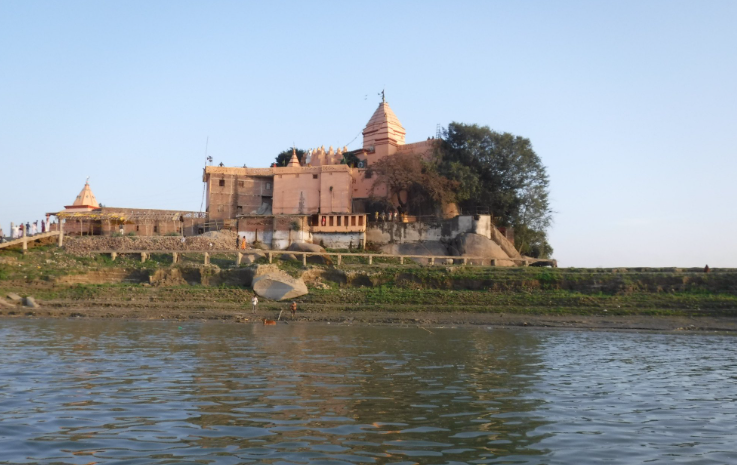

- Location in Bihar

Religion
- Affiliation: Hinduism
- District: Bhagalpur
- Deity: Shiva
- Festivals: Mahashivratri, Shravani Mela

Location
- Location: Sultanganj
- State: Bihar
- Country: India
- Coordinates: 25°15′08.6″N 86°44′03.5″E

Architecture
- Style: Hindu temple architecture
- Creator: Ancient sages (believed)
- Established: Ancient era

Ajgaibinath Dham (also known as Ajgaivinath Dham) is an ancient Hindu temple located in Sultanganj, Bhagalpur district, Bihar, India. Dedicated to Lord Shiva, the temple holds immense religious and historical significance. It is uniquely situated on a rock island in the Ganges River and serves as a major pilgrimage destination, especially during the Shravani Mela, when devotees collect holy water from the Ganges and carry it to Baidyanath Temple in Deoghar. The temple's name is derived from "Aj" (meaning invincible) and "Gaivinath" (a title of Shiva), and it is believed to be self-manifested.

== History and religious significance ==
The origins of Ajgaibinath Dham are traced back to the Treta Yuga, with legends suggesting that Lord Rama worshipped Shiva here before his battle against Ravana. The temple has also been a site of deep meditation for ancient sages. Architecturally, it is a rock-carved temple, featuring a sacred Shiva Linga continuously bathed by the Ganges' waters.

The temple plays a central role in the annual Kanwar Yatra, during which thousands of devotees collect water from Ajgaibinath Dham and nearby Ghats namely Namami Gange Ghat and carry it to Baidyanath Dham in Deoghar. The site is revered for its uninterrupted worship traditions, and it holds a unique distinction—its priests refrain from visiting Baidyanath Dham, citing an age-old religious belief.

== Architecture ==
The temple is built on a small hill-like rock in the Ganga. Its surroundings and the tranquil flow of the river make it a peaceful and picturesque site. The temple features ancient carvings of deities and symbols that reflect the art and architectural styles of early Indian dynasties. The temple is made in Nagara Style of Art. The rocky foundation ensures the temple has withstood centuries of river currents, floods, and erosion, making it an enduring architectural wonder. It is shaped like a boat and it has a shikhara which was donated by Rani Kalavati in 1885.

== Folklore ==
The Mahants (head priests) of the Ajgaibinath Temple in Sultanganj traditionally do not visit the Baidyanath Temple in Deoghar, and this practice has deep-rooted religious and mythological reasons tied to beliefs and customs.

1. According to a popular legend, Lord Shiva chose this place as his dwelling, blessing it with his eternal presence.
2. Sage Jahnu and Ganga: It is believed that Sage Jahnu, who is mentioned in the Mahabharata and Puranas, meditated near this region. The river Ganga is also linked to the legend of Sage Jahnu, who swallowed her and released her later, earning her the name Jahnavi.
3. Sacred Site for Meditation: Many sages and saints are believed to have meditated at this temple due to its tranquil location near the river and its spiritual vibrations.

== Tourism and development ==
Ajgaibinath Dham has been at the center of restoration efforts, with authorities working to preserve its historical and cultural heritage. The Vice-Chancellor of a local university initiated a conservation plan, and religious organizations have advocated for its recognition as a UNESCO World Heritage Site.

The temple has become a significant religious tourism site, attracting both domestic and international visitors. A cruise service from Kolkata, RV Pandav, now facilitates access for foreign tourists. However, environmental concerns such as severe riverbank erosion pose threats to its accessibility and structural stability, prompting urgent conservation efforts.

To further elevate its religious prominence, a proposal has been approved to rename Sultanganj as "Ajgaibinath Dham." Furthermore, Sultanganj Railway Station is set to be renamed after the temple to reflect its cultural and spiritual importance.

== See also ==
- Baidyanath Temple
- Sultanganj
- Deoghar
- Namami Gange Ghat
