= Baidyanath Temple =

Hindu Temple in Deoghar, Jharkhand, India

- बैद्यनाथ ज्योतिर्लिंग
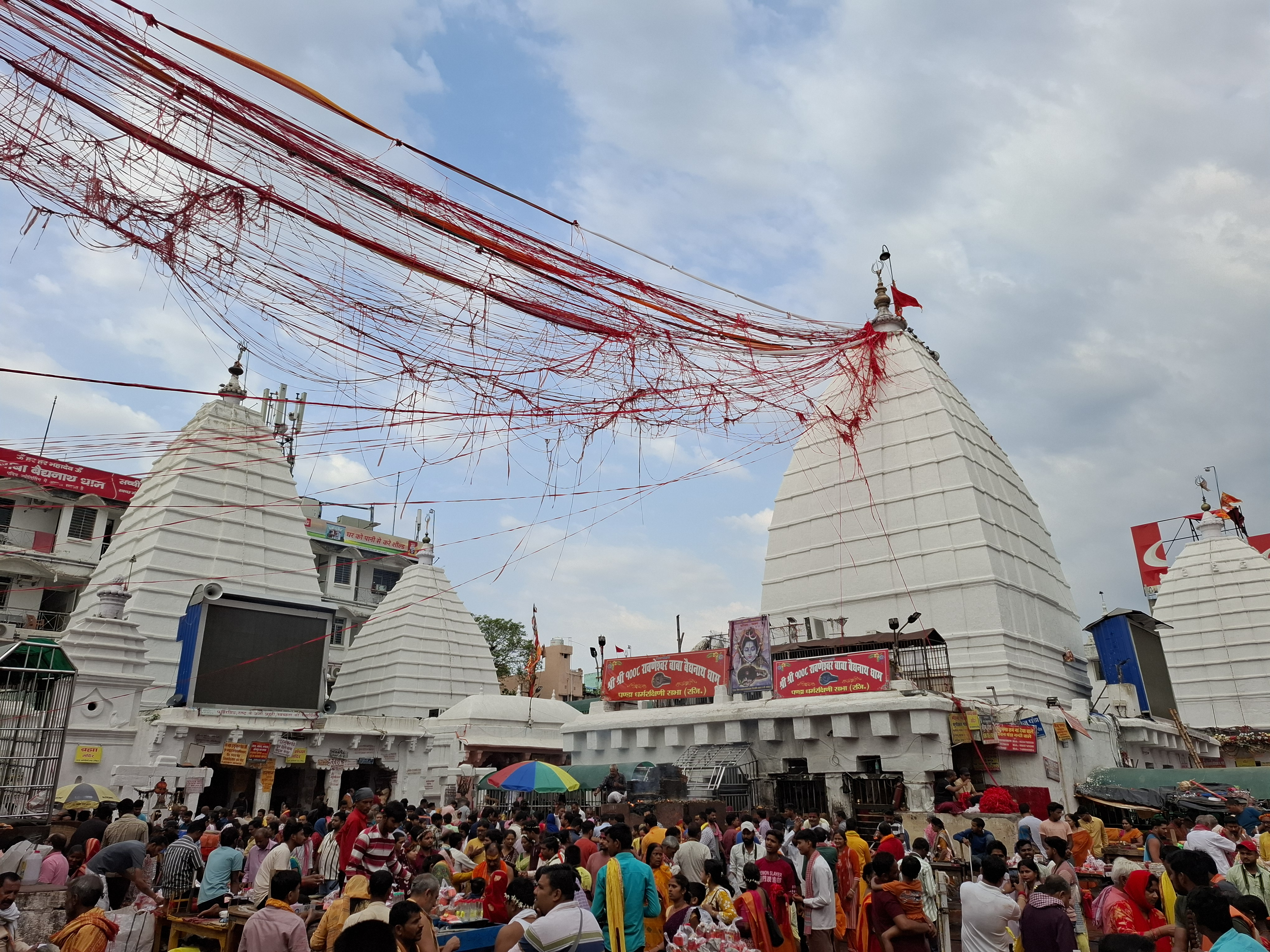
- Pyramid shaped Shikhara of the temple

- Location in Deoghar, Jharkhand.

Religion
- Affiliation: Hinduism
- District: Deoghar
- Deity: Shiva
- Festival: Maha Shivaratri Shravani Mela
- Governing body: Baba Baidyanath Temple Management Board

Location
- Location: Deoghar
- State: Jharkhand
- Country: India
- Coordinates: 24°29′33″N 86°42′00″E

Architecture
- Style: Nagara
- Creator: Raja Beiju Bhil

Specifications
- Temple: 22
- Elevation: 22 m (72 ft)

Website
- babadham.org

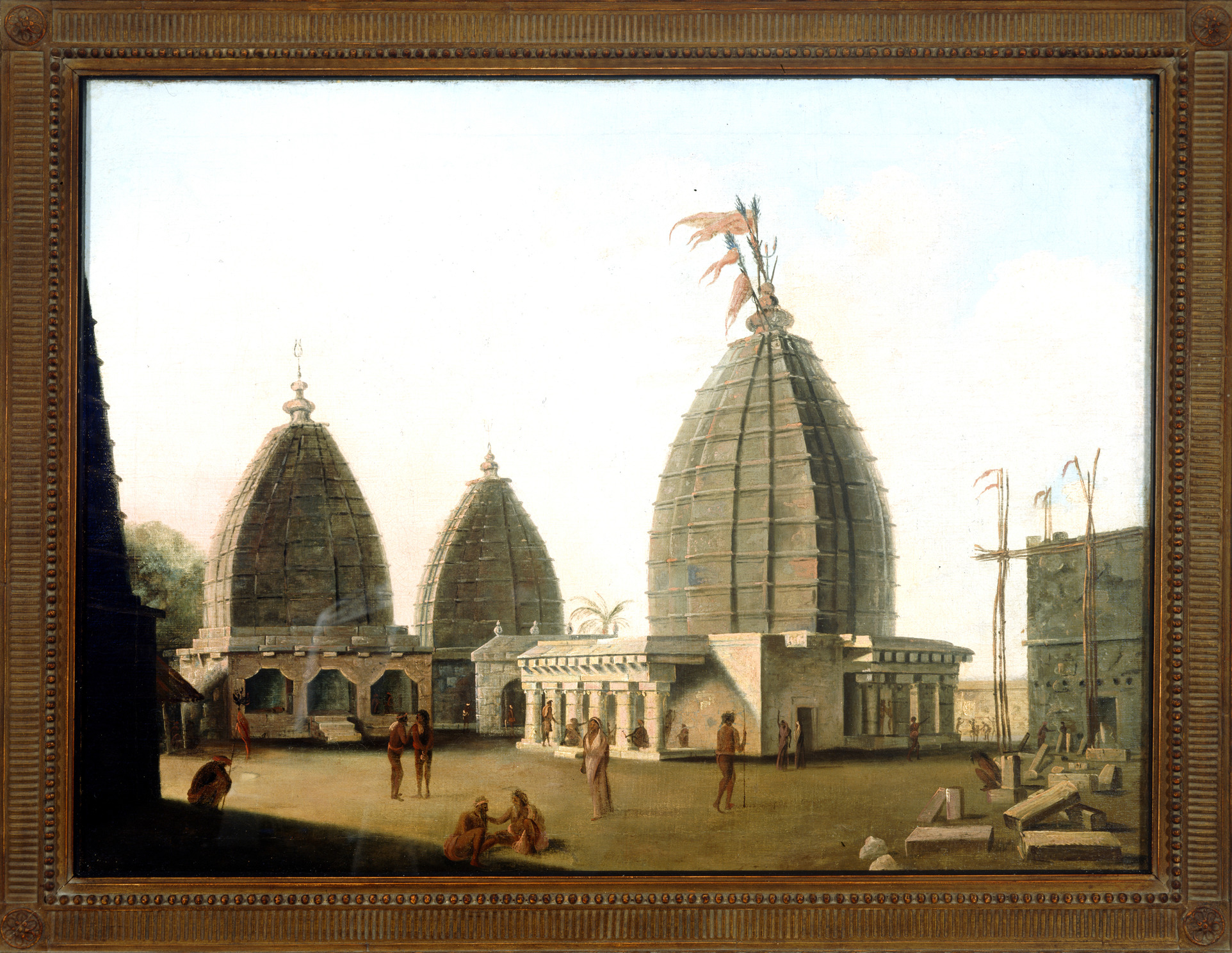
Oil on canvas painting by William Hodges, 1782

Baidyanath Temple (IAST: Baidyãnath) is a Hindu temple dedicated to Shiva. It is located in Deoghar, in the Santhal Parganas division of the Indian state of Jharkhand. The temple complex comprises the central shrine of Baba Baidyanath along with 21 additional temples. It is significant to the Hindu sects of Shaivism as this temple is referred to as one of the twelve Jyotirlingas.

== Legend ==
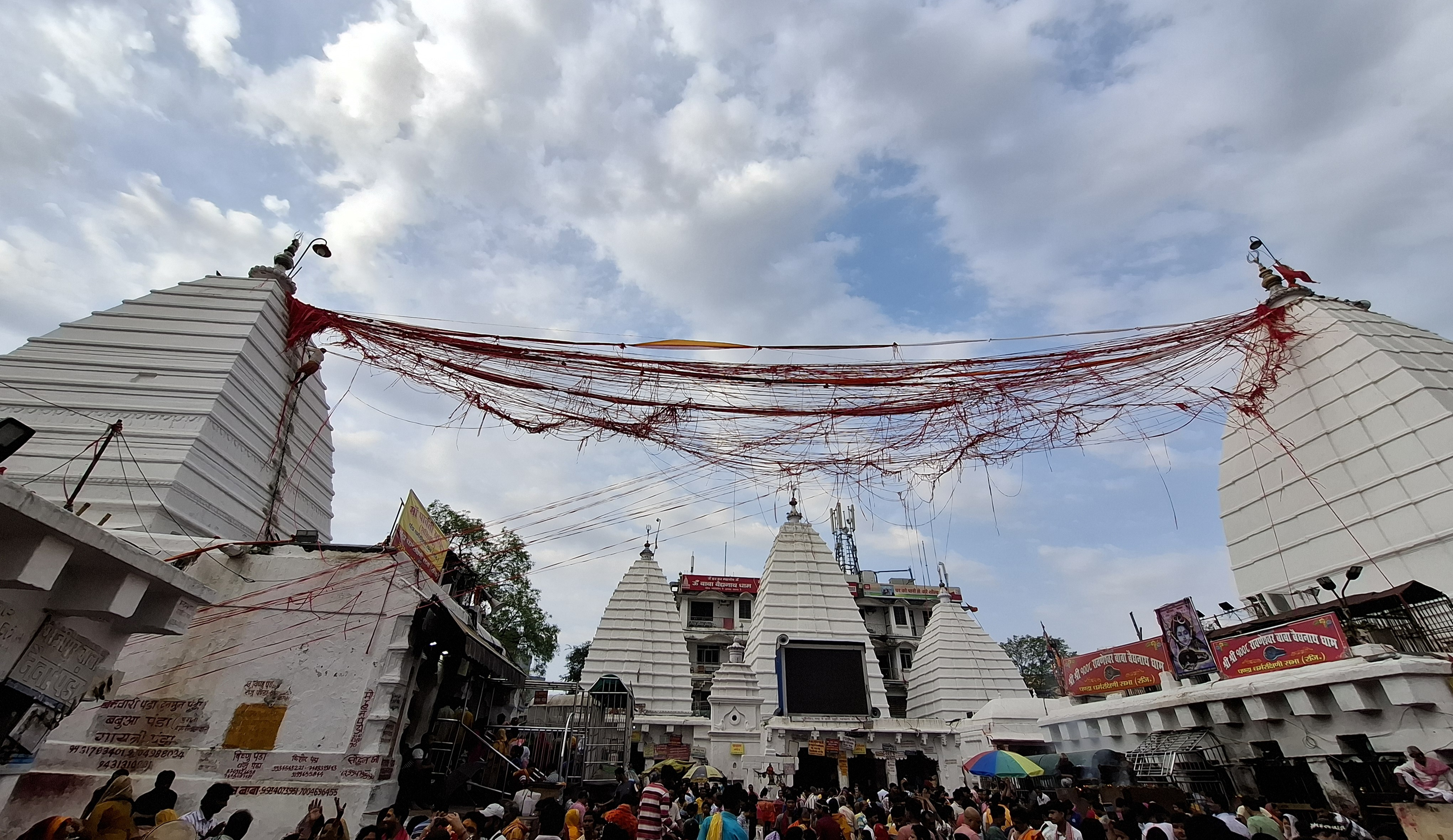
Baidyanath and Parbati temple

According to the legends, Ravana was performing penance in the Himalayan region to appease Shiva. He offered nine of his heads as an offering to Shiva. As he was to sacrifice his tenth head, Shiva appeared before him and expressed satisfaction with the offering. Then, Shiva asked what boon he desired. Ravana asked to take the "Kamna Linga'' to the island of Lanka and expressed his desire to take Shiva from Kailash to Lanka.

Shiva agreed to Ravana's request but with a condition. He said that if the lingam was placed en route, it would become the permanent abode of the deity and could never be moved.

Celestial gods became worried upon hearing that Shiva had departed from his abode on Mount Kailash. They sought a resolution from Vishnu. Vishnu asked Varuna, the deity associated with water, to enter Ravana's stomach through achamana, a ritual that involves sipping water from the palm of one's hand. As a consequence of performing achaman, Ravana departed for Lanka with the lingam and felt the need to urinate in the vicinity of Deoghar.

The story states that Lord Vishnu took the form of a shepherd named Baiju Gadariya from Gadariya caste. While Ravana went to perform Surya Namaskaram, he gave a lingam to this shepherd. Due to the presence of Varun Dev, Ravana took a very long time. Baiju got angry, having to wait for Ravana, for a very long time. He then positioned the lingam on the ground and left the place. Upon returning, Ravana attempted to pick up the lingam, but was unsuccessful in his endeavor. Ravana became upset after realizing this was the doing of Lord Vishnu and proceeded to press his thumb onto the lingam before departing which partially damaged the Shiva Lingam. The Shiva lingam was then worshipped by Brahma, Vishnu, and other deities and they constructed the Baidyanath Temple. Since then, Mahadev has taken up residence in Deoghar as the embodiment of the Kamna Linga.

== Jyotirlinga ==
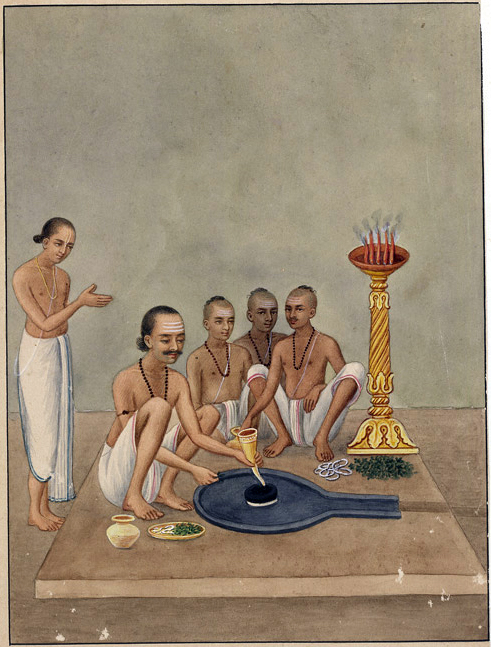
An 1870 watercolour showing worship of the Jyotirlinga in Deoghar.

According to Shiv Mahapuran, once Brahma (the Hindu God of creation) and Vishnu (the Hindu God of preservation) had an argument in terms of supremacy of creation. To test them, Shiva pierced the three worlds as a huge endless pillar of light, the Jyotirlinga. Vishnu and Brahma split their way downwards and upwards respectively to find the end of the light in either direction. Brahma lied that he found out the end, while Vishnu conceded his defeat. Shiva appeared as the second pillar of light and cursed Brahma, that he would have no place in ceremonies while Vishnu would be worshipped until the end of eternity. The jyotirlinga is the supreme partless reality, out of which Shiva partly appears. The jyotirlinga shrines, thus are places where Shiva appeared as a fiery column of light.

Originally there were believed to be 64 jyotirlingas while 12 of them are considered to be very auspicious and holy. Each of the twelve jyotirlinga sites takes the name of the presiding deity — each considered a different manifestation of Shiva. At all these sites, the primary image is lingam representing the beginningless and endless Stambha pillar, symbolizing the infinite nature of Shiva. The twelve jyotirlinga are Somnath at Veraval in Gujarat, Mallikarjuna at Srisailam in Andhra Pradesh, Mahakaleswar at Ujjain in Madhya Pradesh, Omkareshwar in Madhya Pradesh, Kedarnath in Uttarakhand, Bhimashankar in Maharashtra, Viswanath at Varanasi in Uttar Pradesh, Triambakeshwar in Maharashtra, Baidyanath in Jharkhand, Nageshvara at Dwarka in Gujarat, Rameshwar at Rameswaram in Tamil Nadu, and Grishneshwar at Maharashtra.

== Description ==
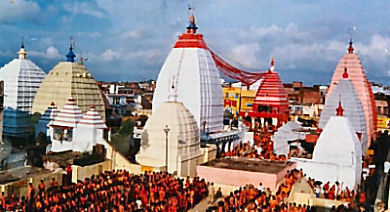
The main temple in Deoghar, Jharkhand

The Matsya Purana called the place Arogya Baidyanathitee. This whole area of Deoghar was under the rule of the Kings of Gidhaur who were much attached with this temple. Raja Bir Vikram Singh founded this princely state in 1266. In 1757 after the Battle of Plassey the officers of the East India Company paid their attention to this temple. An English man, Keating was sent to look at the administration of the temple. Mr. Keating, the first English collector of Birbhum, took interest in the administration of the temple. In 1788, under Mr. Keating's order Mr. Hesilrigg, his assistant, who was probably the first English man to visit the holy city, set out to supervise personally the collection of the pilgrim offerings and dues. Later, when Mr. Keating himself visited Babadham, he was convinced and forced to abandon his policy of direct interference. He handed over the full control of the temple to the hands of the high priest.

The Havan Kund temple of Baba dham opens only once a year, there is a special tradition associated with the Navratri festival.

== The Baidyanath Temple as a Shakta pitha ==
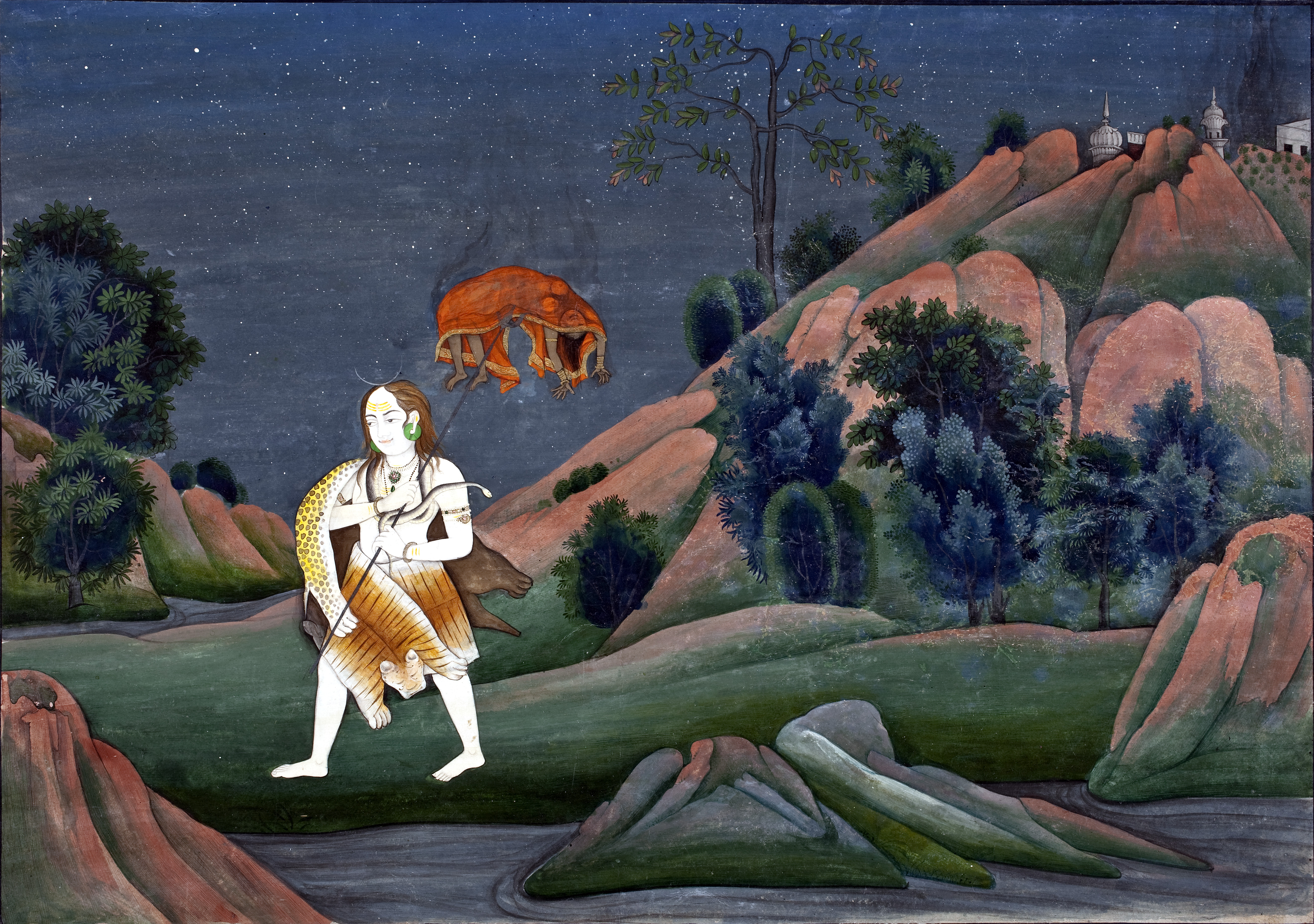
Shiva carrying the corpse of Sati Devi

The mythology of Daksha yaga and Sati's self immolation is the story of origin behind Shakta pithas. Shakta pithas are holy abodes of Devi formed due to the falling of body parts of the corpse of Sati Devi, when Shiva carried it and wandered through. There are 51 Shakta pithas linking to the 51 alphabets in Sanskrit. Each temple has shrines for Shakti and Kalabhairava. The Shakti of the temple is addressed as "Jayadurga" and the Bhairava as "Vaidyanath". It is believed that Sati Devi's heart have fallen here.

== Pilgrimage ==
Millions of pilgrims visit the shrine every year in Shraavana (a mid-summer month of the Hindu calendar) and offer water from the Ganges collected from Ajgaibinath temple in Sultanganj. Pilgrims to the temple later visit the Basukinath temple.

== Connectivity ==
=== Rail ===
Jasidih Junction, located about 7 km (4.3 mi) from the temple on the Howrah–Delhi main line, provides the primary rail connectivity and is served by numerous Mail and Express trains, including premium services such as the Vande Bharat Express and the Rajdhani Express. Baidyanathdham railway station and Deoghar Junction also serve the area, though train services at these stations are limited.

=== Air ===
Deoghar Airport, located around 9 km (5.6 mi) from the temple, operates flights to major metropolitan cities such as Delhi, Mumbai, Bengaluru and Kolkata.

== See also ==
- Ajgaibinath Temple
- Ghats in Bhagalpur
- Famous Hindu yatras
- Hindu pilgrimage sites in India
- List of Hindu festivals
- Padayatra
- Ratha Yatra
- Tirtha
- Tirtha and Kshetra
- Baidyanath Dham (Nepal)

== Notes ==
- Chaturvedi, B. K. (2006), Shiv Purana (First ed.), New Delhi: Diamond Pocket Books (P) Ltd, ISBN 81-7182-721-7
- Eck, Diana L. (1999), Banaras, city of light (First ed.), New York: Columbia University Press, ISBN 0-231-11447-8
- Gwynne, Paul (2009), World Religions in Practice: A Comparative Introduction, Oxford: Blackwell Publication, ISBN 978-1-4051-6702-4.
- Harding, Elizabeth U. (1998). "God, the Father". Kali: The Black Goddess of Dakshineswar. Motilal Banarsidass. pp. 156–157. ISBN 978-81-208-1450-9.
- Lochtefeld, James G. (2002), The Illustrated Encyclopedia of Hinduism: A-M, Rosen Publishing Group, p. 122, ISBN 0-8239-3179-X
- R., Venugopalam (2003), Meditation: Any Time Any Where (First ed.), Delhi: B. Jain Publishers (P) Ltd., ISBN 81-8056-373-1
- Vivekananda, Swami. "The Paris Congress of the History of Religions". The Complete Works of Swami Vivekananda. Vol. 4.
