= Sultanganj, Bihar =

Sultanganj Ajgaibinath Dham
- City
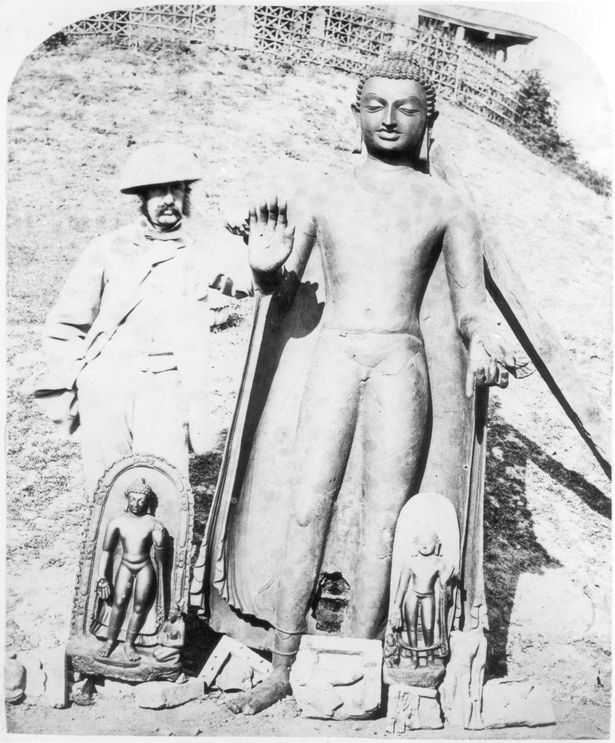
- EB Harris with the Sultanganj Buddha. 1861/1862

- Location in Bihar, India Sultanganj (India)
- Coordinates: 25.246°N 86.738°E
- Country: India
- State: Bihar
- District: Bhagalpur

Population (2011)
  - Total: 52,892

Languages
  - Official: Angika, Hindi
- Time zone: UTC+5:30 (IST)
- PIN: 813213
- Vehicle registration: BR-10

Sultanganj also known as Ajgaibinath Dham is a historic and spiritually significant town in the Bhagalpur district of Bihar, India. It is situated on the southern bank of the Ganga around 25 km west of Bhagalpur City. Every year, lakhs of devotees gather here during the Shravani Mela to collect holy water from the Ganga and walk over 100 km barefoot to the Baidyanath Temple in Deoghar, Jharkhand. The town is also known for its ancient temples, legends from the Mahabharata era, and archaeological finds that link it to early medieval Indian history.

== Etymology and Legends ==
Sultanganj has long been associated with Sage Jahnu. According to popular belief, when the river Ganga disturbed his prayers, Jahnu swallowed the river in anger but later released it, earning her the name Jahnavi. The old name of town i.e Jahngira or Jahnu-Giri (Hill of Jahnu) reflects this legend.

== History ==
Sultanganj was part of the ancient kingdom of Anga, ruled by Karna, the legendary hero of the Mahabharata. Archaeological evidence suggests that Sultanganj was inhabited since early medieval times.

One of the most important finds here is the Sultanganj Buddha, a 2.3 metre tall, over 500 kg copper statue from the Gupta–Pala period (5th–7th century CE). It was discovered in 1861 and is now displayed at the Birmingham Museum and Art Gallery in the UK.

== Geography ==
Sultanganj lies at 25°14′ N, 86°44′ E on the southern bank of the Ganga. The river here flows northwards, earning the title Uttarvahini Ganga, a rare phenomenon considered highly sacred in Hindu tradition. The town also falls within the Vikramshila Gangetic Dolphin Sanctuary, a 60 km protected stretch of the Ganga for conserving the endangered Gangetic dolphin.

As per the Census 2011, the literacy rate of Sultanganj is 70%. Thus Sultanganj has a higher literacy rate compared to 63.1% of Bhagalpur district. The male literacy rate is 65.4% and the female literacy rate is 52.2% in Sultanganj.

== Demographics ==
As per the 2011 Census of India, Sultanganj had a total population of 52,892, comprising 28,240 males and 24,652 females. The sex ratio stood at 873 females per 1,000 males, which is below the Bihar state average of 918. Children aged 0–6 years numbered 8,741, accounting for 16.5% of the town’s population, with a child sex ratio of 917 girls per 1,000 boys.

The overall literacy rate of Sultanganj was 70.95%, considerably higher than the state average of 61.8%. Male literacy was recorded at 77.98%, while female literacy was at 62.83%, highlighting a notable gender gap in education. The town had 9,410 households under the jurisdiction of the Sultanganj Nagar Parishad.

In terms of religion, Hindus formed around 83.24% of the population, while Muslims comprised about 16.48%. Other religious communities made up less than 1% of the population.

== Religious and Cultural Significance ==
The most important event here is the Shravani Mela, held in July–August. Devotees, called Kanwariyas, fetch sacred water from Sultanganj and carry it in kanwars (slings) on foot to Deoghar’s Baidyanath Temple, one of the 12 Jyotirlingas.

The main shrine, Ajgaibinath Temple, stands on a rocky island in the Ganga. Devotees first offer water here before beginning their onward journey to Deoghar. The temple’s present structure, with its Nagara-style shikhara, was renovated in the 19th century by Rani Kalavati of the local royal family.

== Economy ==
The local economy is mainly based on agriculture, religious tourism, small-scale trade, and services catering to pilgrims.

== Transport ==
=== Railway ===
Sultanganj has Ajgaibinath Dham railway station on the Eastern Railway network, well-connected to Bhagalpur, Patna, and other towns in Bihar. A new broad-gauge railway line of approximately 59 km, costing around ₹290 crore, has been sanctioned to directly connect Sultanganj with Deoghar via Banka. The new rail link, once operational, will offer direct ease of travel to Deoghar.

=== Waterway ===
Sultanganj’s water transport primarily serves pilgrims, who use local boats to cross the Ganga during daily worship and the Shravani Mela. The town is also a stop for the MV Ganga Vilas river cruise, boosting tourism along the Ganga. During floods, boats and rescue vessels play a vital role in relief operations. However, seasonal water-level fluctuations and siltation often affect navigation.The Ganga river stretch passing through Sultanganj forms part of National Waterway-1 (NW-1), India’s longest inland water route, which runs from Prayagraj to Haldia via Bhagalpur and other key cities.

A community jetty (mini-port) is proposed at Sultanganj to open it further to domestic and international water traffic, boosting tourism, cargo movement, and economic development in the Bhagalpur district.

=== Roadway ===
Road connectivity is good, and during the Shravani Mela, additional transport facilities are arranged for pilgrims.

Sultanganj is linked to Deoghar by State Highway-22, but the current two-lane road often clogs up during the Shravani Mela, and parts like the bypass near the railway station need urgent repairs. Upgrades are underway—a four-lane highway to Deoghar (₹534 crore, due by 2028), the Ganga Path corridor with stretches from Munger to Sultanganj and Sultanganj to Sabour (₹10,000 crore combined) and the Aguwani–Sultanganj Ganga bridge set for completion in March 2026.

== See also ==
- Sultanganj Buddha
- Ajgaibinath Dham
- Namami Gange Ghat

== Notable people ==
- Sanjay Jha, chairman and CEO of Motorola Mobility
- Tilka Manjhi, Indian tribal leader and rebel recognised as one of the earliest figures to rebel against British colonial rule.
