= Carmel Convent School =

Group of Catholic schools in India

- Multiple; India

Information
- Type: Group of Catholic schools
- Established: 16 July 1957; 69 years ago

Carmel Convent School is a group of Catholic schools in India. It has branches in Delhi Chanakyapuri, Giridih, Gorakhpur, Bhopal, Bangalore, Rourkela, Khopoli, Faridabad, Jorhat, Chandigarh, Gwalior, Kolkata, Durgapur, Madhupur, Dhanbad, Mancherial, Lucknow, Ujjain, Ahmedabad, Junagadh, Nahan (H.P.) and the Andaman and Nicobar Islands.

== History ==
The Carmel Convent School was founded on 16 July 1957, by Mother Theodosia and five other sisters. It had no facilities and was dependent on donations. The first student, Iona D’Souza, was admitted on 1 July 1957, and she was followed by 59 others. On 16 July, during the Feast of the Lady of Mount Carmel, the school was formally inaugurated.

In December 1957, there were 150 students enrolled, and by January 1985 enrollment had reached 350 students. Lower classes were added the following year. To accommodate this surge in students, the school rented a larger house.

=== Giridih ===
Carmel School Giridih is located in Jharkhand, India. It was established in 1954 and is affiliated with the Indian Certificate of Secondary Education Board, New Delhi.

=== Bhopal ===
Bhopal's Carmel Convent School was established by Mother Theodosia and her five sisters of Carmel in 1968. It is directed by the Congregation of Sisters of the Apostolic Carmel. The school is affiliated with the Central Board of Secondary Education, New Delhi and managed by the Carmel Convent Education Society.

=== Gwalior ===
The Carmel Convent Senior Secondary School, Gwalior, was founded in 1957 and is managed by the Teresian Carmel Education Society. The all-girls school offers classes from LKG to XII and is affiliated with the CBSE (Central Board of Secondary Education) board, New Delhi.

== See also ==
- Carmel Convent School, Gwalior
- Carmel School, Madhupur
- Mount Carmel Convent Anglo-Indian Girls High School, Tangasseri, Kollam, Kerala.
