= Sido Kanhu Murmu University =

Public university in Dumka, Jharkhand, India

- सिदो कान्हू मुर्मू विश्वविद्यालय
- Seal of Sido Kanhu Murmu University
- Former name: Siddhu Kanhu University
- Motto: Nīrakṣīravivekinī Vidyā (Sanskrit)
- Motto in English: Knowledge is that which discerns between milk and water
- Type: Public University
- Established: 1992 (34 years ago)
- Accreditation: NAAC
- Academic affiliations: UGC; AIU; BCI
- Chancellor: Governor of Jharkhand
- Vice-Chancellor: Kunul Kandir
- Location: Dumka, Jharkhand, India - 814110; 24°16′24″N 87°17′13″E
- Campus: 109 acres (44 ha); Urban
- Acronym: SKMU
- Website: skmu.ac.in

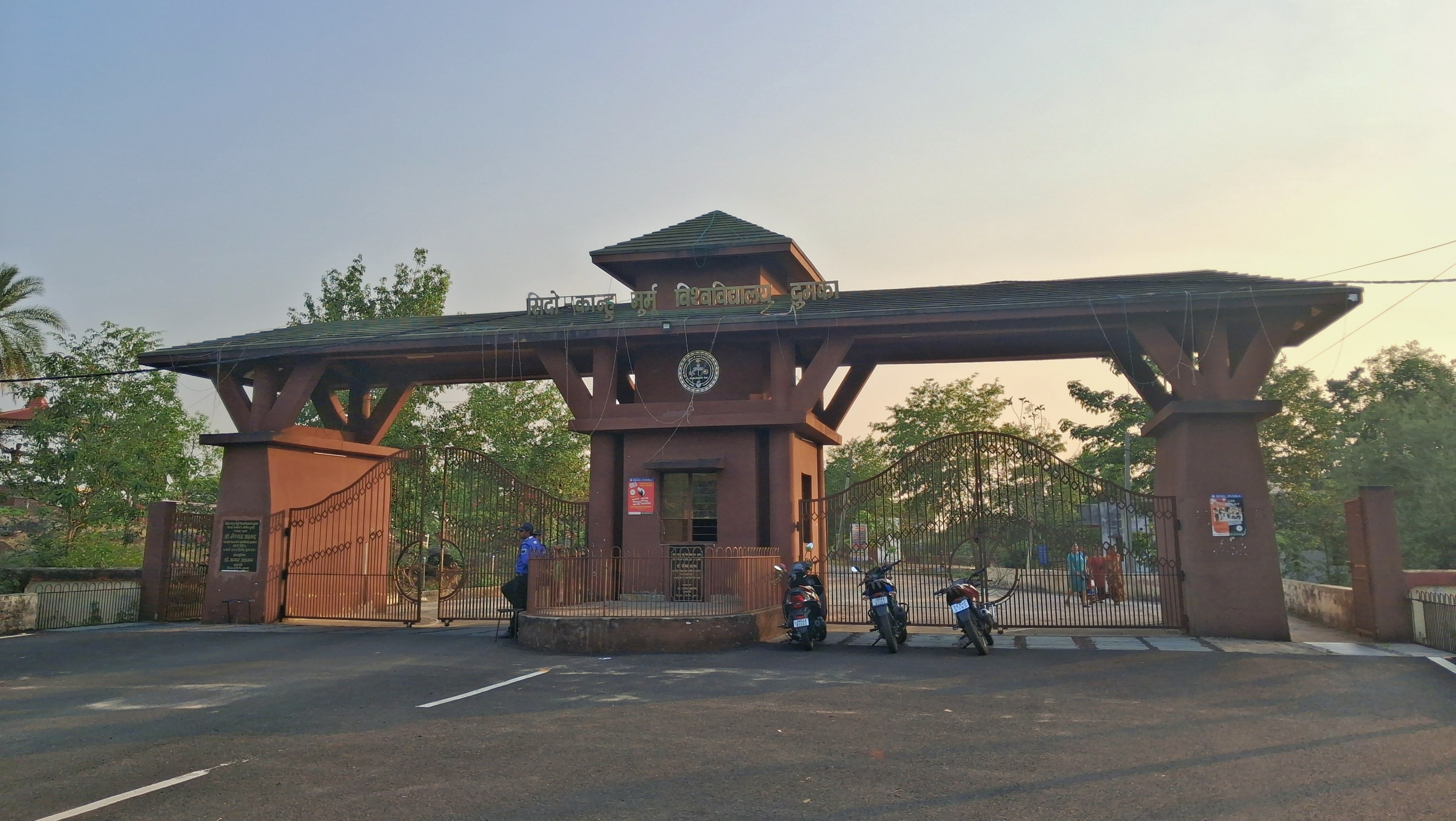
Entrance gate of Sido Kanhu Murmu University

Sido Kanhu Murmu University (SKMU), formerly Siddhu Kanhu University, is a public state university situated in the Santhal Parganas region of Jharkhand state in eastern India. It has its headquarters at Dumka, the second capital of Jharkhand. The university offers both undergraduate and postgraduate courses in various streams and have 27 constituent colleges and 15 affiliated colleges across six districts of Jharkhand.

== History ==
Sido Kanhu Murmu University was founded as Siddhu Kanhu University on 10 January 1992 by an Act of Bihar Legislative Assembly. It was carved out from Bhagalpur University, now known as Tilka Manjhi Bhagalpur University.

The university was renamed as Sido Kanhu Murmu University on 6 May 2003 by an amendment made in the section 3(1) of the Jharkhand State Universities Act 2000 (Amendment). It is named after Sidhu Murmu and Kanhu Murmu, brothers who led the Santhal rebellion against the British in 1855–56.

The university was affiliated to the Association of Indian Universities on 6 May 1993. It was granted official recognition by University Grants Commission (UGC) under Section 2(f) of the UGC Act, 1956 on 30 May 1995, and was subsequently included under Section 12(B) of the Act on 8 August 2007. The university is also accredited by National Assessment and Accreditation Council (NAAC) and has a recognition from Department of Higher and Technical Education, Government of Jharkhand.

== Organisation and administration ==
Like most state universities in India, the Chancellor of Sido Kanhu Murmu University is the Governor of Jharkhand. The position was previously held by the Governor of Bihar until the formation of the state of Jharkhand on 15 November 2000 and by the Governor of Jharkhand thereafter. The Vice-Chancellor serves as the chief executive of the university.

As of 2025, the Vice-Chancellor of Sido Kanhu Murmu University is Prof. (Dr.) Kunul Kandir, who assumed office in May 2025.

List of Vice Chancellors
Sr. No.	Name	Term start	Term end
1	Dr. Amar Kumar Singh	2 February 1992	2 February 1995
2	Sri S. N. Dubey (I.A.S)	3 February 1995	30 June 1995
3	Sri U. K. Nanda (I.A.S)	1 July 1995	6 October 1997
4	Sri K. K. Pandey (I.A.S)	7 October 1997	16 June 1998
5	Sri Rajesh Gupta (I.A.S)	17 June 1998	22 June 1998
6	Dr. Uday Pratap Singh	23 June 1998	25 June 2001
7	Dr. (Mrs.) Indu Dhan	27 June 2001	27 June 2004
8	Dr. P. C. Hembram	28 June 2004	28 June 2007
9	Dr. Victor Tigga	29 June 2007	28 June 2010
10	Prof. M. Basheer A. Khan	14 July 2010	13 July 2013
11	Prof. (Dr.) Ram Yatan PD.	13 July 2013	9 May 2014
12	Prof. Qamar Ahsan	10 May 2014	22 March 2017
13	Prof. M. P. Sinha	10 May 2017	28 May 2020
14	Prof. (Dr.) Sonajharia Minz	9 June 2020	8 June 2023
15	Prof. (Dr.) Bimal Prasad Singh	9 June 2023	7 May 2025
16	Prof.(Dr.) Kunul Kandir	8 May 2025	Incumbent

== Colleges ==
The university have its jurisdiction extends over six districts – Deoghar, Dumka, Godda, Jamtara, Pakur and Sahibganj.

=== Affiliated colleges ===
This university comprises 15 affiliated colleges, which are:

Sl. No	College	District	Established	Principal
1	J. M. College, Jasidih	Deoghar	1978	Bal Krishna Dubey
2	A. N. College, Dumka	Dumka	1979	Rajesh Kr. Singh
3	M. G. College, Ranishwar	Dumka	1984	Raish khan
4	St. Xavier's College, Dumka	Dumka	2011	S. Stephen Raj
5	Shikaripara College, Shikaripara	Dumka	1982	Aftabuddin Gulam
6	Mahila College, Godda	Godda	1983	Kiran Chowdhary
7	Maulana Abul Kalam Azad Degree College, Basantrai	Godda		
8	S.B.S.S.P.S.J. College, Pathargama	Godda	1980	Virendra Kr. Singh
9	Bhagwat Jha Azad College, Kundahit	Jamtara		Dinesh Rai
10	Degree College, Nala	Jamtara	1988	Gunmay Das
11	Jamtara Sandhya Mahila College, Jamtara	Jamtara	1982	Mohan Mandal
12	J. J. S. College, Mihijam	Jamtara	1983	Niranjan Prasad
13	B.L.N.L. Bohra College, Rajmahal	Sahebganj		H. S. Singh
14	B. S. A. Mahila College, Barharwa	Sahebganj	1996	A. P. Dubey
15	Shibu Soren Janjatiya Degree College, Borio	Sahebganj		

=== Constituent colleges ===
This university comprises 27 constituent colleges, which are:

Sl. No	College	District	Established	Principal
1	A.S. College, Deoghar	Deoghar	1969	Dr. Nilima Verma
2	Deoghar College, Deoghar	Deoghar	1951	Dr. Akhilesh Kumar
3	R. D. Bajla Mahila College, Deoghar	Deoghar	1970	Dr. Suchita Kumari
4	Madhupur College, Jharkhand	Deoghar	1966	Dr. Ratnakar Bharti
5	Santal Pargana College, Dumka	Dumka	1955	Dr. Khirodhar Pd. Yadav
6	Santal Pargana Mahila College, Dumka	Dumka	1974	Dr. Rakesh Kumar
7	Godda College, Godda	Godda	1955	Dr. Smiti Kumari
8	Millat College, Parsa	Godda	1986	Dr. Tusar Kant
9	Jamtara College, Jamtara	Jamtara	1969	Dr. Koushal
10	K. K. M. College, Pakur	Pakur	1966	Dr. Yugal Jha
11	B. S. K. College, Barharwa	Sahibganj	1982	Dr. Basant Kumar Gupta
12	Sahibganj College, Sahibganj	Sahibganj	1953	Dr. Syed Raza Imam Rizvi
13	S. R. T. College, Dhamri	Sahibganj	1964	Dr. Nimai Chandra Das
14	Model College, Pakur	Pakur		Dr. Bishwanath Sah
15	Model College, Sahibganj	Sahibganj	2022	Dr. Ranjit Kumar Singh
16	Model College, Dumka	Dumka	2022	Dr. Mary Margret Tudu
17	Model Mahavidyalaya, Navadih, Palajori, Deoghar	Deoghar		Dr. Manoj Kr. Mishra
18	Model Mahavidyalaya, Godda	Godda		Dr. Rishikesh Kumar
19	New Model Degree (Mahila) College, Pakur	Pakur		Dr. Sushila Hansda
20	Mahila Mahavidyalaya, Sahibganj	Sahibganj		Dr. Meera Choudhary
21	Degree College, Nala (Fatehpur)	Jamtara		Dr. Amar Das
22	Degree College, Mahagama	Godda		Dr. Rahul Kumar Santosh
23	Degree College, Shikaripara	Dumka		Dr. Subodh Prasad Rajak
24	Degree College, Jarmundi	Dumka		Dr. Niranjan Kumar Mandal
25	Degree College, Maheshpur	Pakur		Dr. Md. Masood Ahmad
26	Mahila Mahavidyalaya, Sarath	Deoghar		Dr. Bijendra Turi
27	Mahila Mahavidyalaya, Madhupur	Deoghar	2024	Dr. Bharat Prasad

=== Medical Colleges ===
Sl. No.	College	District	Established	Principal
1	Phulo Jhano Medical College and Hospital	Dumka	2019	Dr. Arun Kumar Choudhary

=== B.Ed Colleges ===
Constituent B.Ed Colleges:

This university comprises 5 constituent B.Ed colleges, which are:

- A. S. College, Deoghar
- S. P. College, Dumka
- Sahibganj College
- Godda College
- K. K. M. College

Affiliated B.Ed Colleges:

This university comprises 11 affiliated B.Ed colleges, which are:

- Dev Sangh Institute of Professional Studies and Education, Deoghar
- Deoghar B.Ed College, Jasidih
- Madhusthali Institute of Teachers Training, Madhupur
- Govt. Teachers Training College, Deoghar
- Chanakya B.Ed College, Madhupur
- Rahat B.Ed College, Madhupur
- Morawala B.Ed College, Jasidih
- Hindi Vidyapith, Deoghar
- B.Ed College, Tokipur
- Shivam College of Education, Deoghar
- Pakur B.Ed College, Pakur

== Academics ==
The University offers undergraduate, postgraduate and doctoral programmes across various disciplines in its campus and through its constituent and affiliated colleges. The academic framework of the university is organized under the following faculties:

- Faculty of Science - Department of Physics, Chemistry, Mathematics, Botany and Zoology.
- Faculty of Humanities - Department of English, Philosophy, Hindi, Bengali, Sanskrit, Santali and Urdu.
- Faculty of Social Science - Department of Economics, Geography, History, Psychology, Sociology and Political Science.
- Faculty of Commerce - Department of Commerce.
- Faculty of IT And Management - Department of MCA, BBA and MBA.

Alongside conventional courses, the university also runs professional and vocational programmes. These include both (B.LIS) and (M.LIS), the Bachelor of Education (B.Ed.) in the teaching sector and diploma courses in tribal languages, with a special focus on Santhali and other regional languages of the Santhal Pargana region.

Admission

The admission process for both undergraduate and postgraduate programmes at the University is conducted online through the Chancellor Portal and CUET. For undergraduate courses, candidates must have passed the Higher Secondary (10+2) examination, while for postgraduate courses a relevant bachelor’s degree is required. Selection is generally merit-based, determined by marks obtained in the qualifying examination, followed by publication of merit lists, document verification and fee payment. For professional programmes like MBA, BCA and MCA, admission also requires qualifying performance in national or state level entrance or university based entrance examinations like MAT, JCECEB, CUET PG etc.

For Ph.D. admissions, candidates must possess a master’s degree in the relevant subject with a minimum of 55% aggregate marks (50% for SC/ST/OBC) and must have qualified through JRF/NET/NET-Ph.D./GATE/JET, etc., with selection based on exam performance and an interview.

Accreditation and recognition

The university is recognized by the University Grants Commission (UGC) under Sections 2(f) and 12(B) of the UGC Act, 1956. It received accreditation from the National Assessment and Accreditation Council (NAAC) in 2018. The university is also affiliated to the Association of Indian Universities.

== See also ==
- List of universities in India
- List of institutions of higher education in Jharkhand
