= Raj Paliwar =

Indian politician

Member of the Jharkhand Legislative Assembly
- In office 2014–2019
- Preceded by: Haji Hussain Ansari
- Succeeded by: Haji Hussain Ansari
- Constituency: Madhupur

Council of Minister in Minister of Labour, Employment & Training
- In office 19 February 2015 – 29 December 2019
- Constituency: Madhupur

Member of the Jharkhand Legislative Assembly
- In office 2005–2009
- Preceded by: Haji Hussain Ansari
- Succeeded by: Haji Hussain Ansari
- Constituency: Madhupur

Personal details
- Born: Raj Paliwar; 1 January 1972 (age 54) Deoghar, Jharkhand
- Citizenship: India
- Party: Bhartiya Janata Party
- Parent: Satya Narayan Paliwar
- Education: Graduated from Deoghar College Deoghar, Bhagalpur University in 1987
- Occupation: Agriculture, politician.

Raj Paliwar is an active Indian politician from Bharatiya Janata Party Jharkhand state in India. He held ministerial position as Minister of Labour, Employment & Training of Jharkhand during Raghubar Das ministry. He was two times member of Jharkhand Legislative Assembly from Madhupur from 2014-2019 and 2005-2009.

== Political journey ==
In 2005, he was elected as an MLA from the Madhupur constituency in Jharkhand.
