= Amit Kumar Mandal =

Indian politician

Member of the Jharkhand Legislative Assembly
- In office 19 May 2016 – 23 November 2024
- Preceded by: Raghu Nandan Mandal
- Succeeded by: Sanjay Prasad Yadav
- Constituency: Godda

Personal details
- Born: 1984 (age 41–42) Godda, Bihar, India (now in Jharkhand)
- Party: Bharatiya Janata Party
- Parent: Raghu Nandan Mandal (father)
- Education: Jaypee Institute of Information Technology (B.Tech); University of Bradford (MBA)

Amit Kumar Mandal (born c. 1984) is an Indian politician and a former Member of the Legislative Assembly (MLA). He represented the Godda constituency in the Jharkhand Legislative Assembly from 2016 to 2024 as a member of the Bharatiya Janata Party (BJP).

== Early life and education ==
Mandal was born in Godda, Jharkhand (then part of Bihar). His father, Raghu Nandan Mandal, was also a politician and represented Godda in the legislative assembly.

Mandal completed his schooling at Godda. He graduated with a Bachelor of Technology (B.Tech) degree in Computer Applications from Jaypee Institute of Information Technology in Noida in 2007. He later earned a Master of Business Administration (MBA) degree in Marketing from the University of Bradford in England in 2011.

== Political career ==
Mandal entered active politics following the death of his father, the sitting MLA Raghu Nandan Mandal, in January 2016. He contested the subsequent by-election for the Godda constituency held on 16 May 2016. He won the seat by a margin of 34,551 votes, defeating his nearest rival, Sanjay Prasad Yadav of the Rashtriya Janata Dal (RJD).

In the 2019 Jharkhand Legislative Assembly election, Mandal successfully retained the Godda seat as the BJP candidate, securing 87,578 votes and defeating Sanjay Prasad Yadav of the RJD by a margin of 4,512 votes. During his tenure, Mandal was honored with the Aadarsh Yuva Vidhayak Samman (Ideal Youth MLA Award) by the Bharatiya Chhatra Sansad (Indian Student Parliament) for his development work and contributions to parliamentary democracy.

Mandal contested the 2024 Jharkhand Legislative Assembly election from the Godda constituency but was defeated by Sanjay Prasad Yadav of the RJD, who polled 109,487 votes against Mandal's 88,016 votes.

== Electoral history ==
=== 2024 Assembly election ===
2024 Jharkhand Legislative Assembly election: Godda
Party	Candidate	Votes	%	±%
RJD	Sanjay Prasad Yadav	1,09,487	49.56	
BJP	Amit Kumar Mandal	88,016	39.84	
Majority		21,471	9.72	
Turnout		2,20,918		
RJD gain from BJP		Swing		

=== 2019 Assembly election ===
2019 Jharkhand Legislative Assembly election: Godda
Party	Candidate	Votes	%	±%
BJP	Amit Kumar Mandal	87,578	45.74	
RJD	Sanjay Prasad Yadav	83,066	43.38	
Majority		4,512	2.36	
Turnout		1,91,466	76.81	
Amit Kumar Mandal hold		Swing		

=== 2016 By-election ===
2016 Jharkhand Legislative Assembly by-election: Godda
Party	Candidate	Votes	%	±%
BJP	Amit Kumar Mandal	83,987	50.84	
RJD	Sanjay Prasad Yadav	49,436	29.92	
Majority		34,551	20.91	
Turnout		1,65,210	65.0	
Amit Kumar Mandal hold		Swing		

== See also ==
- Jharkhand Legislative Assembly
