= Godda Assembly constituency =

Godda
- Constituency No. 17 for the Jharkhand Legislative Assembly

Constituency details
- Country: India
- Region: East India
- State: Jharkhand
- District: Godda
- Lok Sabha constituency: Godda
- Established: 2000
- Total electors: 2,88,545
- Reservation: None

Member of Legislative Assembly
- 5th Jharkhand Legislative Assembly
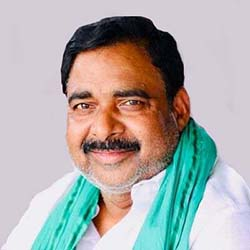
- Incumbent Sanjay Prasad Yadav
- Party: RJD
- Alliance: MGB
- Elected year: 2024

Godda Assembly constituency is an assembly constituency in the Indian state of Jharkhand.

== Overview ==
Godda Assembly constituency covers: Godda Police Station (excluding Burhikura, Dammajhilua, Sandmara, Nonbatta, Makhni, Pathra and Punsiya gram panchayats) and Pathargama Police Station in Godda district.

Godda Assembly constituency is part of Godda (Lok Sabha constituency).

== Members of Legislative Assembly ==
Election	Member	Party
Bihar Legislative Assembly
1952	Budhinath Kairav Jha	Indian National Congress
1952	Babulal Tudu (Godda Damin constituency)	Jharkhand Party
1957	Manilal Yadav	Jharkhand Party
1957	Chunka Hembrom	Independent politician
1962	Deep Narain Chaudhary	Indian National Congress
1967	Deep Narain Chaudhary	Indian National Congress
1969	Hemant Kumar Jha	Samyukta Socialist Party
1972	Hemant Kumar Jha	Indian National Congress
1977	Lakhan Mahto	Janata Party
1980	Hemant Kumar Jha	Indian National Congress
1985	Sumrit Mandal	Jharkhand Mukti Morcha
1990	Sumrit Mandal	Jharkhand Mukti Morcha
1995	Rajnish Anand	Indian National Congress
2000	Sanjay Prasad Yadav	Rashtriya Janata Dal
Jharkhand Legislative Assembly
2005	Manohar Kumar Tekariwal	Bharatiya Janata Party
2009	Sanjay Prasad Yadav	Rashtriya Janata Dal
2014	Raghu Nandan Mandal	Bharatiya Janata Party
2019	Amit Kumar Mandal	Bharatiya Janata Party
2024	Sanjay Prasad Yadav	Rashtriya Janata Dal

== Election results ==
=== Assembly Election 2024 ===
2024 Jharkhand Legislative Assembly election: Godda
Party	Candidate	Votes	%	±%
RJD	Sanjay Prasad Yadav	109,487	49.56%	▲6.18
BJP	Amit Kumar Mandal	88,016	39.84%	▼5.90
JLKM	Parimal Kumar Thakur	9,237	4.18%	New
Independent	Shahid Raja	3,248	1.47%	New
ASP(KR)	Ranjit Kumar	1,530	0.69%	New
BSP	Shree Ram Turi	1,371	0.62%	New
NOTA	None of the Above	2,308	1.04%	▼0.38
Margin of victory		21,471	9.72%	▲7.36
Turnout		2,20,916	70.22%	▲3.86
Registered electors		3,14,588		▲9.03
RJD gain from BJP		Swing	▲3.82	

=== Assembly Election 2019 ===
2019 Jharkhand Legislative Assembly election: Godda
Party	Candidate	Votes	%	±%
BJP	Amit Kumar Mandal	87,578	45.74%	▼6.63
RJD	Sanjay Prasad Yadav	83,066	43.38%	▲12.56
JD(U)	Ravindra Mahto	6,417	3.35%	New
JVM(P)	Phool Kumari	1,728	0.90%	New
PECP	Noor Hassan	1,708	0.89%	New
AJSU	Awadhesh Kumar Singh	1,596	0.83%	New
AAP	Rabindra Shankar Mishra	1,019	0.53%	New
NOTA	Nota	2,731	1.43%	▼0.02
Margin of victory		4,512	2.36%	▼19.19
Turnout		1,91,478	66.36%	▲6.76
Registered electors		2,88,545		▲7.22
BJP hold		Swing	▼6.63	

=== Assembly By-election 2016 ===
2016 Jharkhand Legislative Assembly by-election: Godda
Party	Candidate	Votes	%	±%
BJP	Amit Kumar Mandal	83,987	52.37%	▲3.67
RJD	Sanjay Prasad Yadav	49,436	30.82%	▲1.39
JMM	Sanjiv Marik Yadav	18,337	11.43%	▲1.75
Independent	Hasina Ansari	1,981	1.24%	New
Independent	Ashok Tiwari	1,210	0.75%	New
NOTA	None of the Above	2,322	1.45%	New
Margin of victory		34,551	21.54%	▲2.27
Turnout		1,60,385	60.46%	▼6.50
Registered electors		2,69,112		▼0.62
BJP hold		Swing	▲3.67	

=== Assembly Election 2014 ===
2014 Jharkhand Legislative Assembly election: Godda
Party	Candidate	Votes	%	±%
BJP	Raghu Nandan Mandal	87,158	48.70%	▲23.89
RJD	Sanjay Prasad Yadav	52,672	29.43%	▼1.63
JMM	Rajesh Kumar Sah	17,329	9.68%	▼6.62
JVM(P)	Sanjeev Anand	6,994	3.91%	▼5.40
Independent	Bindeshwari Prasad Sah	2,678	1.50%	New
Independent	Hasina Ansari	1,660	0.93%	New
BSP	Viveka Nand Mishra	1,346	0.75%	▼3.39
NOTA	None of the Above	2,889	1.61%	New
Margin of victory		34,486	19.27%	▲13.02
Turnout		1,78,980	66.09%	▲7.91
Registered electors		2,70,793		▲12.50
BJP gain from RJD		Swing	▲17.64	

=== Assembly Election 2009 ===
2009 Jharkhand Legislative Assembly election: Godda
Party	Candidate	Votes	%	±%
RJD	Sanjay Prasad Yadav	43,502	31.06%	▲8.67
BJP	Raghu Nandan Mandal	34,747	24.81%	▼7.15
JMM	Manohar Kumar Tekriwal	22,832	16.30%	▲2.20
JVM(P)	Rajesh Kumar	13,031	9.30%	New
BSP	Suresh Kumar Mahto	5,803	4.14%	▲1.18
Independent	Mujiv Alam	3,234	2.31%	New
NCP	Kumar Jitendra	1,687	1.20%	New
Margin of victory		8,755	6.25%	▼3.32
Turnout		1,40,057	58.18%	▲0.97
Registered electors		2,40,715		▲0.65
RJD gain from BJP		Swing	▼0.90	

=== Assembly Election 2005 ===
2005 Jharkhand Legislative Assembly election: Godda
Party	Candidate	Votes	%	±%
BJP	Manohar Kumar Tekariwal	43,728	31.96%	▲14.04
RJD	Sanjay Prasad Yadav	30,639	22.39%	▼0.91
INC	Rajnish Anand	23,877	17.45%	▲3.42
JMM	Prem Nandan Kumar	19,290	14.10%	▲1.40
BSP	Ram Pratap Narayan	4,057	2.97%	New
AJSU	Dukh Mochan Chaudhary	2,600	1.90%	New
Independent	Deoraj Dubey	1,817	1.33%	New
Margin of victory		13,089	9.57%	▲4.18
Turnout		1,36,824	57.21%	▼7.37
Registered electors		2,39,166		▲16.97
BJP gain from RJD		Swing	▲8.65	

=== Assembly Election 2000 ===
2000 Bihar Legislative Assembly election: Godda
Party	Candidate	Votes	%	±%
RJD	Sanjay Prasad Yadav	30,774	23.30%	New
BJP	Dukh Mochan Choudhary	23,663	17.92%	New
INC	Rajnis Anand	18,522	14.03%	New
SP	Raghu Nandan Mandal	17,658	13.37%	New
JMM	Prem Nandan Kumar	16,774	12.70%	New
CPI	Abdul Wahab	13,930	10.55%	New
CPI(ML)L	Haldhar Mandal	6,338	4.80%	New
Margin of victory		7,111	5.39%	
Turnout		1,32,049	65.61%	
Registered electors		2,04,474		
RJD win (new seat)				

== See also ==
- Vidhan Sabha
- List of states of India by type of legislature
- Pathargama
