= Madhupur, Deoghar =

Madhupur
- Town
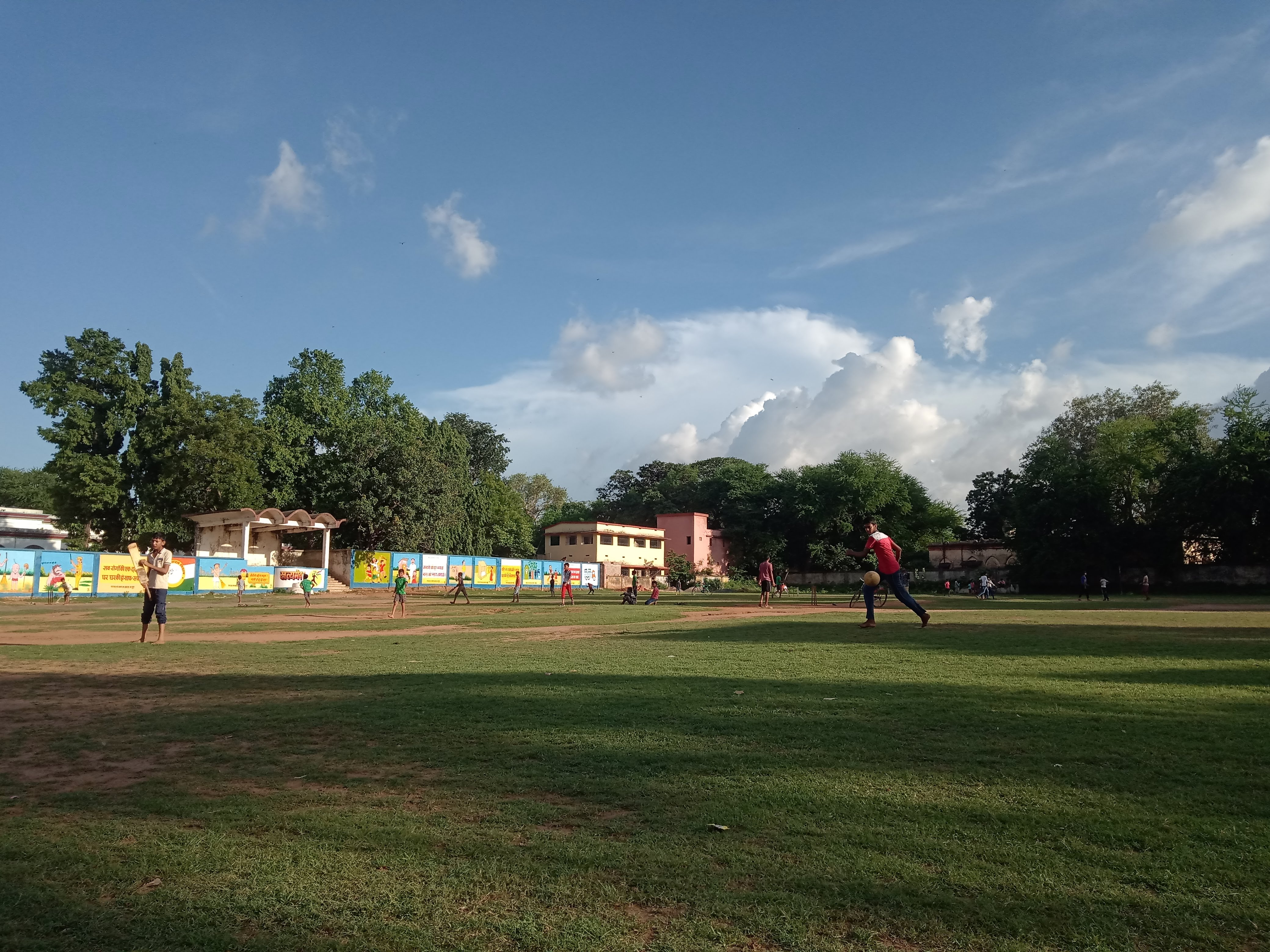
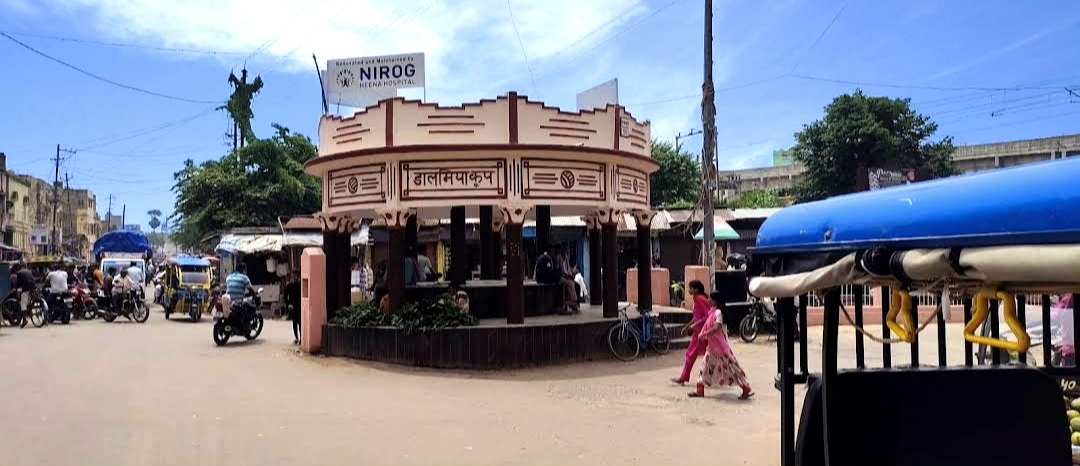
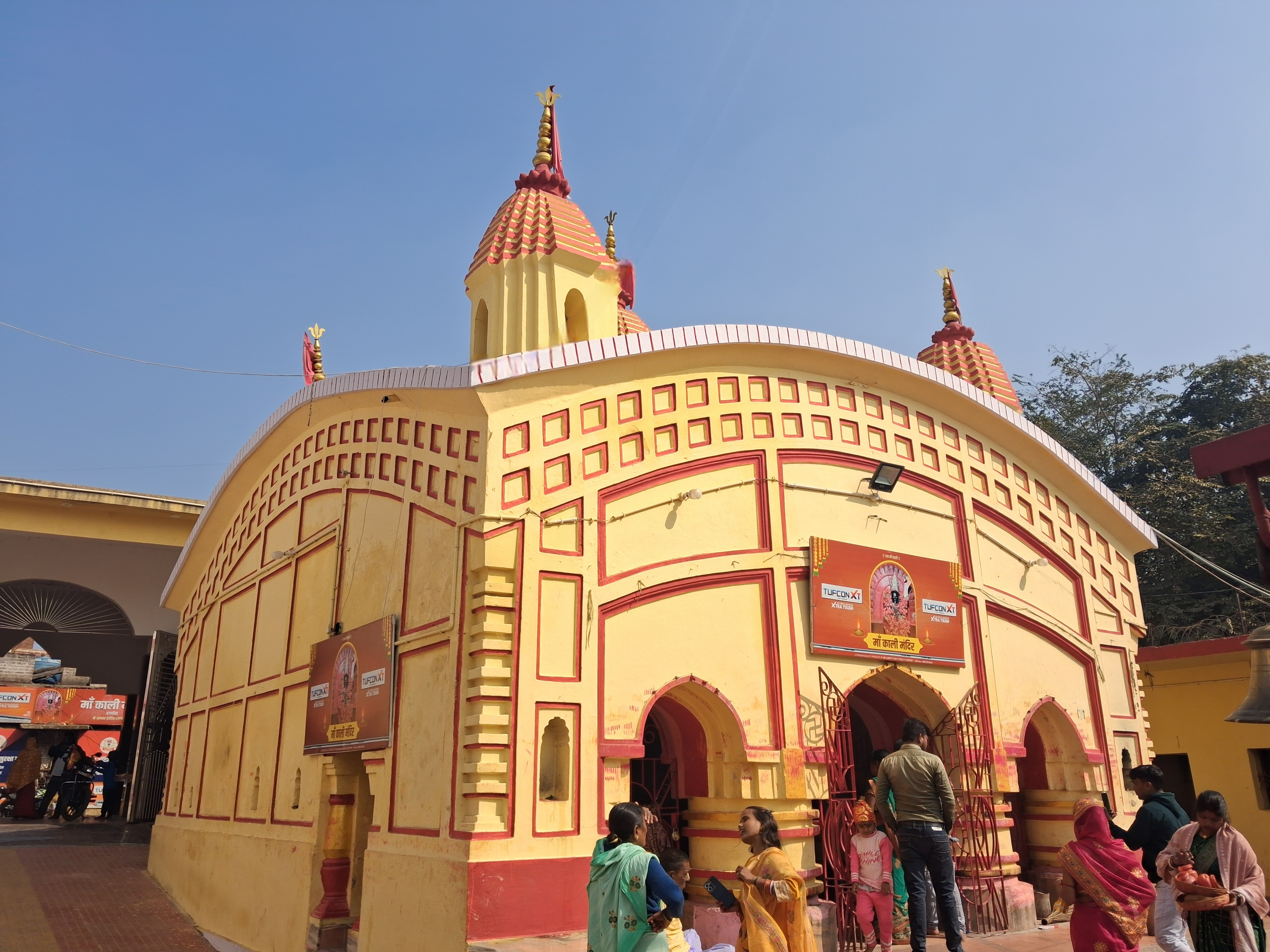
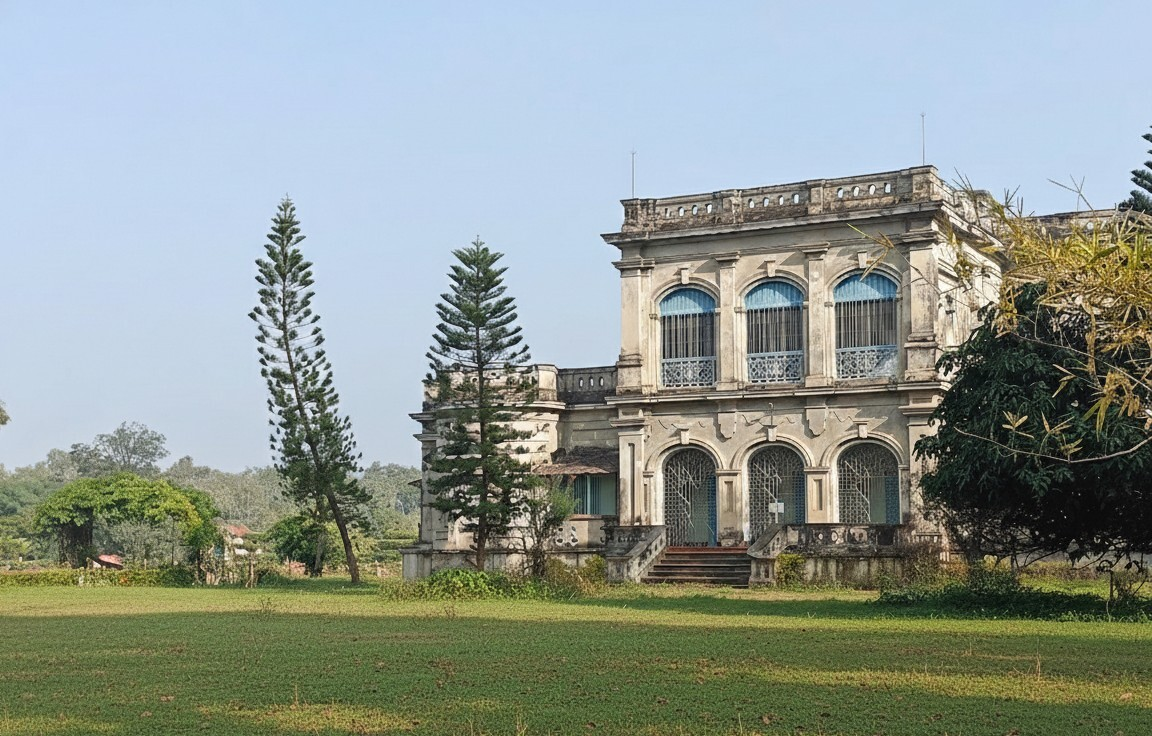
- From top to bottom: Dak Bangla Ground, Dalmia Koop, a prominent landmark in the town, Pathrol Kali Temple, Sett Villa Heritage Guest House

- Location in Jharkhand, India Madhupur (India)
- Coordinates: 24.26°N 86.65°E
- Country: India
- State: Jharkhand
- District: Deoghar

Government
  - Type: Municipality
  - Body: Madhupur Municipality
  - Chairman: Darakshan Parveen
  - Sub-Divisional Magistrate: Rajiv Kumar, JAS
  - Sub-Divisional Police Officer: Satyendra Prasad, JPS
- Elevation: 228 m (748 ft)

Population (2011)
  - Total: 55,238

Languages
  - Official: Hindi, Santali
- Time zone: UTC+5:30 (IST)
- PIN: 815353
- Telephone code: 06438
- Vehicle registration: JH-15
- Lok Sabha constituency: Godda
- MP: Nishikant Dubey (BJP)
- Vidhan Sabha constituency: Madhupur
- MLA: Hafizul Hassan (JMM)
- Website: https://deoghar.nic.in/

Madhupur is a town with a municipality in Deoghar district in the Indian state of Jharkhand. It is a subdivisional town, famous for the production of sweets and widely considered a popular health resort for tourists as the water and overall climate is said to cure many stomach and digestion ailments.

== History ==
According to legends, the place is named after a Gopa named Madhu, who had a large herd of cattle in the region.

Historically, there were many notable people, particularly from Bengal, who owned a house in Madhupur and lived there for long periods whenever they could. Amongst them were Sashibhusan Chattopadhyay FRGS FRSA and Sir Asutosh Mookerjee. His younger son, Uma Prasad Mookerjee, the writer famous for his travel books spent time there.

== Geography ==
Cities, towns and locations in the Deoghar, Dumka and Jamtara districts in Santhal Pargana Division
M: Municipality, CT: census town, R: Rural/ Urban centre, D: Dam,
Owing to space constraints in the small map, the actual locations in a larger map may vary slightly

=== Location ===
Madhupur is at 24.26°N 86.65°E. It has an average elevation of 228 metres (748 ft). Madhupur is surrounded by two monsoon rivers, Pathro Nadi and Jayanti Nadi. They feed the Ajay, which is a tributary of the Ganges, meeting it at Katwa in West Bengal.

=== Police Station ===
Madhupur Police Station has jurisdiction over Madhupur Municipality area and its nearby villages that comes under the jurisdiction of Madhupur block.

=== Overview ===
The map shows a large area, which is a plateau with low hills, except in the eastern portion where the Rajmahal hills intrude into this area and the Ramgarh hills are there. The south-western portion is just a rolling upland. The entire area is overwhelmingly rural with only small pockets of urbanisation.

Note: The full screen map is interesting. All places marked on the map are linked in the full screen map and one can easily move on to another page of his/her choice. Enlarge the full screen map to see what else is there – one gets railway connections, many more road connections and so on.

== Demographics ==
=== Population ===
According to the 2011 Census of India, Madhupur had a total population of 55,238, of which 28,889 (52%) were males and 26,349 (47%) were females. Population in the age range 0–6 years was 7,848 (14%). The total number of literate persons in Madhupur was 37,658 (79.46% of the population over 6 years) out of which male and female literacy rate is 86.46 and 71.72 percent respectively.

=== Religion ===
Religion in Madhupur town
Religion	Percent
Hinduism	59.87%
Islam	38.93%
Christianity	1.02%
Sikhism	0.02%
Jainism	0.01%
Buddhism	0.03%
Others	0.12%

Hinduism is the majority religion of Madhupur town followed by 59.87% of the population. Sari Dharam is followed by the Santal tribe residents and Sarna by other tribe (The percentage will notified soon official sooner the Govt. Of India accomplishes recent Census). Islam is the second largest majority religion in the town followed by 38.93% of the people.

== Administrative set up ==
The overall administration of the Madhupur is headed by the Sub-divisional Officer (SDO), also known as the Sub-Divisional Magistrate (SDM), who is typically an officer the Indian Administrative Service (IAS) or Jharkhand Administrative Service (JAS), appointed by Jharkhand state government. The SDM acts as the chief executive magistrate of the subdivision town and is responsible for maintaining law and order, overseeing revenue collection, and coordinating various government departments and development schemes within the region. The office plays a crucial role in ensuring effective governance at the sub-district level and acts as a vital link between the district administration and the local bodies.

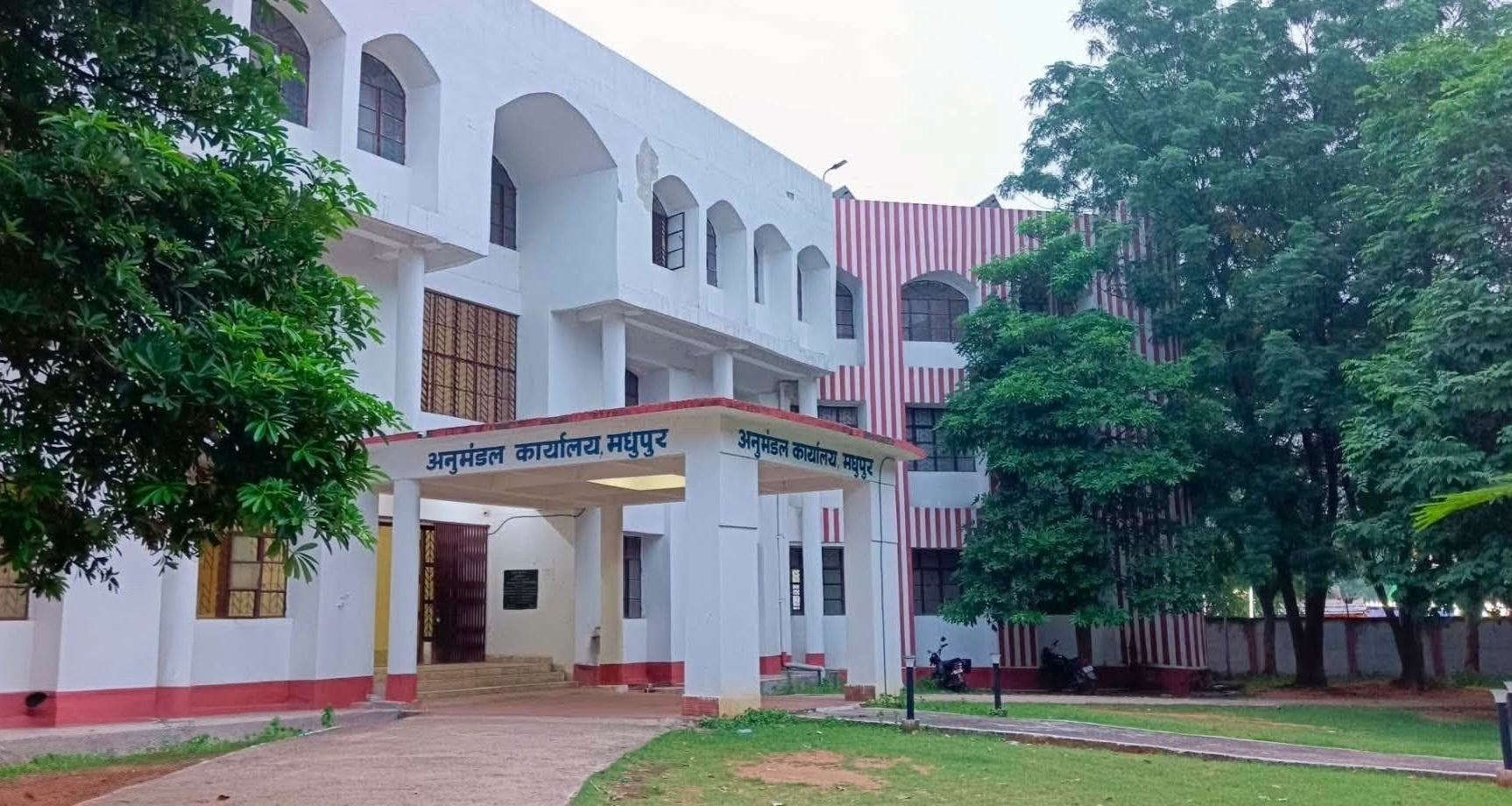
Madhupur Sub-Divisional Office

In same way, Madhupur Municipality functions as the key urban local body governing the town, overseeing civic administration and infrastructure related work in the town and its nearby area. It manages services like water supply, sanitation, waste management and local roads across 23 wards and also handles key documents like issuing birth and death certificates, trade licenses, tax collection, building permissions and other statutory work.

== Economy ==
=== Industry ===
La Opala RG Limited is an India-based company set up a small factory in Madhupur, Jharkhand, to manufacture opal glass in India for the first time. Founded in by Sushil Jhunjhunwala and Ajit Jhunjhunwala. The company is a leading manufacturer and marketer of life style product in the tableware segment. The Company deals with glass and glassware. The company's products include opalware and crystal. Opalware includes dinner sets, cup saucer sets, coffee mug sets, tea sets and soup sets. Crystal includes barware, vases, bowls, ashtrays and beer mugs.

== Education ==
=== Colleges ===
- Madhupur College, Jharkhand

=== Schools ===
- Carmel School Madhupur - CISCE
- Madhusthali Vidyapeeth - CISCE
- St. Xavier's Mission School - CISCE
- Mahendra Muni Saraswati Shishu Vidya Mandir - CBSE
- Mothers International Academy - CBSE
- Kendriya Vidyalaya - CBSE
- Shalom School - CBSE
- Nalanda Academy - CBSE
- St. Joseph High School - JAC
- MLG High School - JAC
- Shyama Prasad Mukherjee High School - JAC
- Anchi Devi Balika Uccha Vidyalaya - JAC
- Anandalaya Public School, Beside Jagadishpur Branch Post Office, Madhupur - CBSE [1][2]

== Healthcare ==
- All India Institute of Medical Sciences, Deoghar
- Subdivisional Hospital, Madhupur

== Tourism ==
- Maa Pathrol Kali Temple is located in Pathrol nearby Madhupur, Deoghar in the Santhal Parganas division of the state of Jharkhand, India. It is roughly 7km from the Madhupur Town. The temple consists of a shrine dedicated to Goddess Kali. It is one of the oldest and sacred temple in Madhupur which was built by Raja Digvijay Singh about 6 to 7 centuries ago. Worship is held every day from Monday to Sunday. Animals are sacrificed as part of worship. There are nine more temple close to the main temple. An Annual fair is held every year during the month of Kartik (Oct.-Nov.) where thousands and thousands, of Pilgrims and devotees gather here for the worship and to witness the fair.
- Budheshwari Temple is located across the Pathro river on its verge near village Burhai which is just 28 km from Madhupur. The image of Goddess Kali known as Maa Budheswari is installed up on a hill of one solid block. The sight of the hill is very picturesque. A large number of people assemble there on the eve of Nawan Mela in the month of Agrahan(Nov-Dec) to worship. The Mela is concluded when the day is over. A fair is also held here on the occasion of Makar Sankranti in the month of Magh(Jan-Feb)

Being an important railway junction on the Delhi-Howrah Main line it is well-connected to other major parts of the country. Madhupur has gained popularity as a health resort due to the two monsoon rivers, Patro Nadi & Jaynti Nadi flowing here the water of which is believed to provide relief from various stomach and digestion ailments.

== Transport ==
=== Airport ===
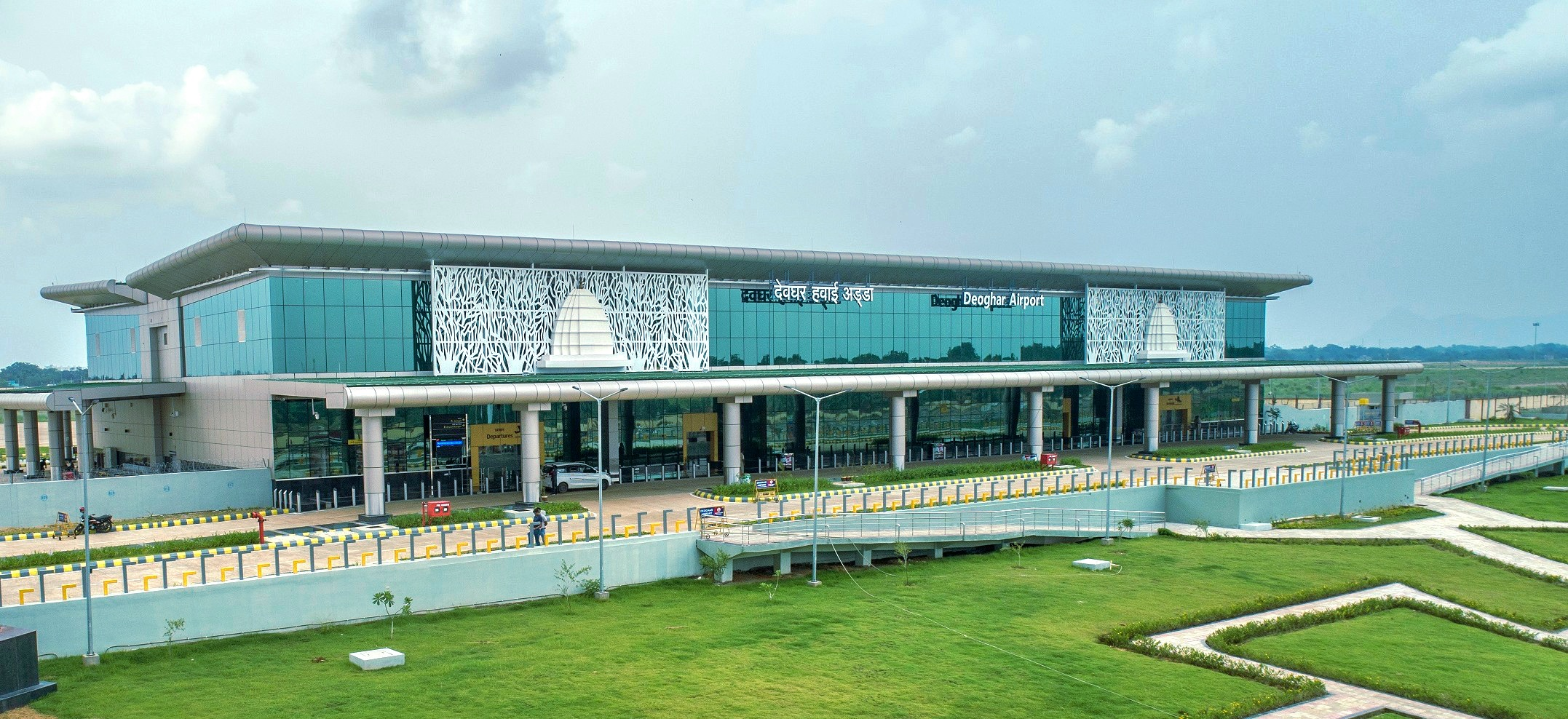
Terminal building of Deoghar Airport

Deoghar Airport (IATA: DGH, ICAO: VEDO), is the closet domestic airport located approximately 31 km (19 mi) from the Madhupur. The airport was inaugurated by Prime Minister Narendra Modi on July 12, 2022. As of now IndiGo operates its flight services only for Delhi, Kolkata, Mumbai, Ranchi, Patna and Banglore. The nearest international airport is Netaji Subhash Chandra Bose International Airport in Kolkata which is located 294 km (182 mi) from the town.

=== Highways ===
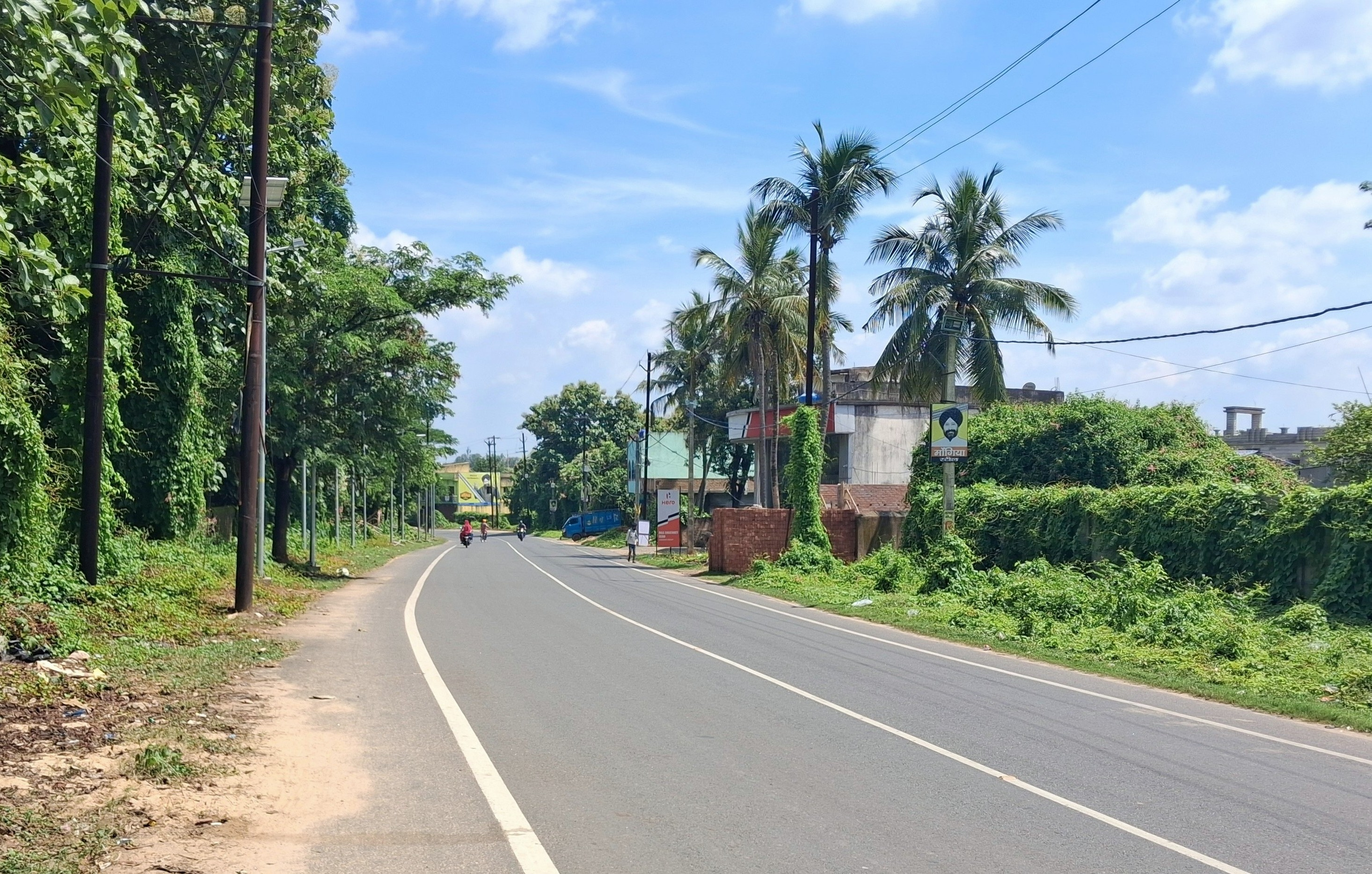
Section of NH 114A passing through Madhupur

Madhupur is well connected by road as it lies along National Highway 114A, which begins at Rampurhat (West Bengal), passes through Shikaripara, Dumka, Lakrapahari, Jama, Jarmundi, Choupa More, Deoghar, Sarath, Madhupur, Giridih and terminates at Dumri on NH 19 in Jharkhand.

=== Railway ===
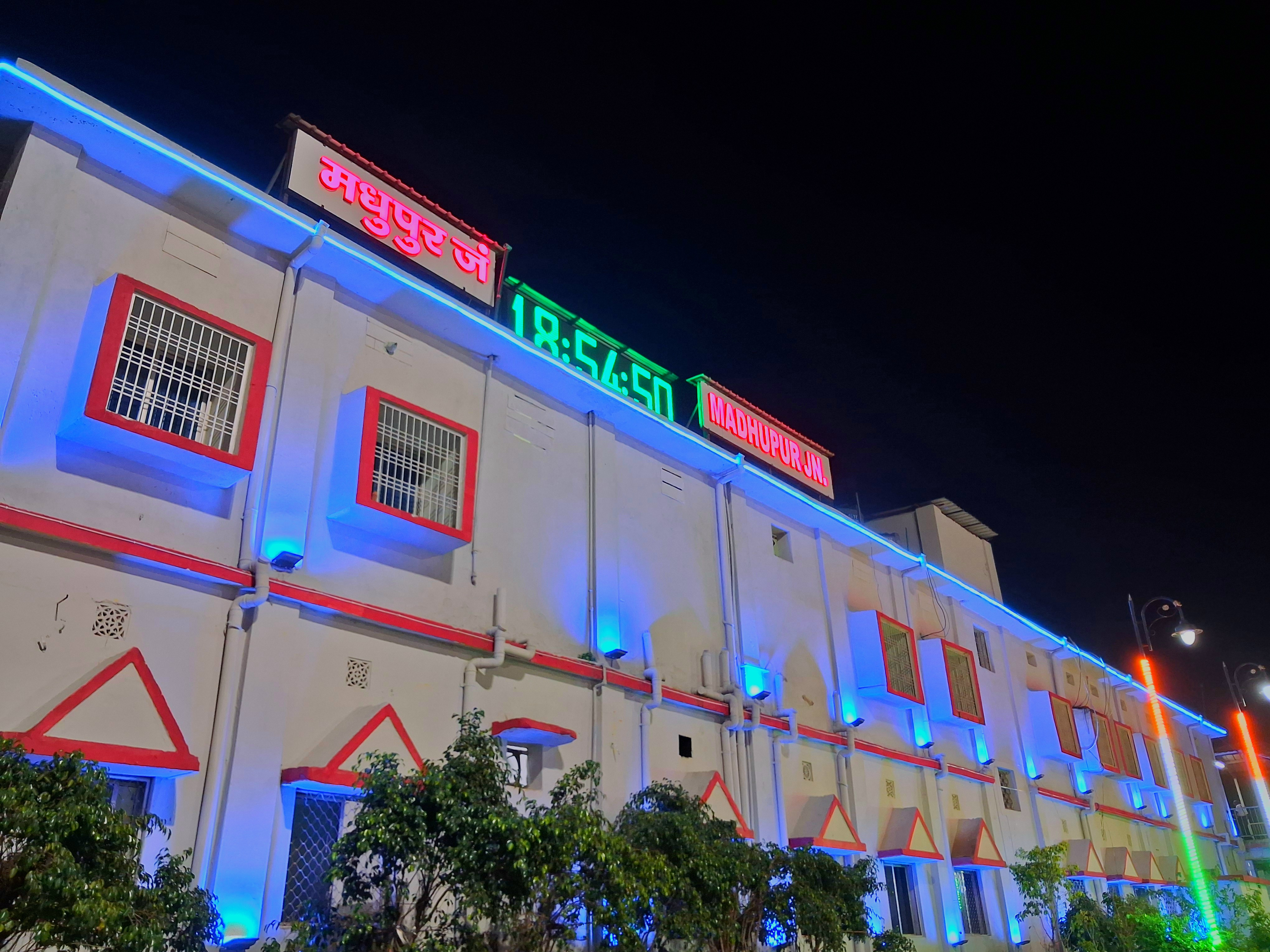
Madhupur railway station

Madhupur Junction (Station code: MDP), is a railway station of Indian Railway that connects the town of Madhupur and its nearby areas to major Indian metropolitan cities like Delhi, Kolkata, Mumbai, Bengaluru and Patna via the Howrah–New Delhi main line (Asansol–Patna section). It also links Giridih and Koderma through the 137 km single broad-gauge Madhupur–Giridih–Koderma line. With four platforms, PRS counter, WiFi, Retiring rooms and basic amenities, it handles numerous passenger trains daily like Madhupur–Anand Vihar Terminal Humsafar Express, Baba Baidyanath Dham Deoghar Humsafar Express and many more. Once this used to be a coal storage hub for steam engines, it's now the second busiest station of Asansol Railway division of Eastern railway.

== See also ==
- Madhupur Municipality
- Madhupur College
- Madhupur Junction
- Madhupur Assembly constituency
- Madhupur subdivision
- Madhupur (community development block)
- Maa Pathrol Kali Temple, Madhupur
- Deoghar district
- Deoghar
- Santhal Pargana division
- Giridih
