= Phulo Jhano Medical College and Hospital, Dumka =

Medical college in Jharkhand, India

Phulo Jhano Medical College and Hospital
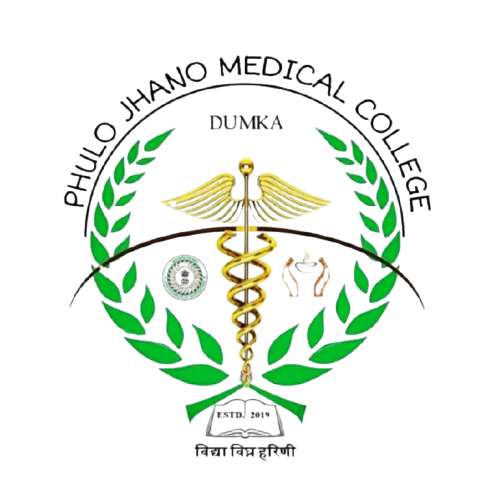
- Former name: Dumka Medical College
- Recognition: NMC
- Type: Medical College and Hospital
- Established: 2019; 7 years ago
- Affiliations: Sido Kanhu Murmu University
- Principal: Dr. Gajendra Kumar Singh
- Undergraduates: 100 (MBBS) students intake every year
- Location: Dumka, Jharkhand, India, India; 24.273°N 87.282°E
- Campus: 25 acres (10 ha); Urban
- Website: http://dumkamedicalcollege.org/

Phulo Jhano Medical College and Hospital is a tertiary referral Government Medical college. The college is affiliated to Sido Kanhu Murmu University and is recognized by National Medical Commission. The hospital associated with the college is one of the largest hospitals in the Dumka district.

== Curriculum ==
Phulo Jhano Medical College and Hospital, Jharkhand undertakes education and training of students in MBBS courses.

== Admissions ==
Admission is based on merit through the National Eligibility and Entrance Test. Yearly undergraduate intake was 100 students for 2019.

== Developments ==
In December 2021, 13 senior resident doctors were posted at the college to address the shortage of medical staff.

In 2023, a seven-storey, 500-bed hospital building was under construction at the college's campus. It had separate buildings planned for the residents, interns, nurses and administrative staff.

In November 2023, the hospital added six ECG machines in the emergency department, medicine and surgery wards, intensive care unit and casualty department. A liquid medical oxygen plant was added in December 2023.

== Incidents ==
In November 2021, the poor condition of the post-mortem facilities at the hospital was reported. In 2022, ultrasonography got suspended at the hospital owing to the lack of sufficient facilities. In June 2023, the poor condition of the ICU at the medical college was also reported.

In April 2025, students of the college protested over shortages of drinking water, electricity, and non-functional lifts in the hostel buildings. The protest affected the OPD services. The college principal replied that the administration was working to fix the problems. The OPD services resumed after remaining closed for two days.
