= Haji Hussain Ansari =

Indian politician (died 2020)

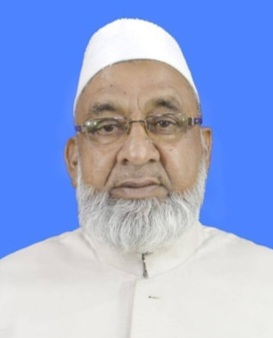

Minister of Minority Welfare and Registration of Jharkhand
- In office 28 January 2020 – 3 October 2020
- Chief Minister: Hemant Soren
- Succeeded by: Hafizul Hassan

Personal details
- Born: 1947 or 1950 Pipra, Madhupur, Deoghar, Bihar, India
- Died: 3 October 2020 (aged 70 or 73) Ranchi, Jharkhand, India
- Party: Jharkhand Mukti Morcha
- Relations: Hafizul Hassan (son)
- Occupation: Politician

Haji Hussain Ansari (born c. 1947 and 1950 – 3 October 2020) was an Indian politician and a leader of the Jharkhand Mukti Morcha (JMM). He served as Minister of Minority Welfare and Registration Department in the Government of Jharkhand from 28 January 2020 until his death. Ansari was the first and only Muslim to become minister in the state of Jharkhand. He was elected to the Jharkhand Assembly on the JMM ticket four times from Madhupur Assembly constituency in 1995, 2000, 2009 and 2019 respectively. He also acted as the leader of the opposition in 2004.

== Life ==
Ansari was born in the village of Pipra near Madhupur.

Ansari started his political career with the Indian National Congress in the 1980s. In the early 1990s he joined Jharkhand Mukti Morcha which was under the leadership of Shibu Soren. He contested the election for the Madhupur Assembly constituency in 1995 and won the election. Together with Soren Ansari he played an important role in the movement for statehood of Jharkhand. He was again elected MLA in 2000 for the Madhupur constituency. He was elected as leader of the opposition in 2004. He was elected once more in the 2009 Jharkhand Legislative Assembly election. During 2010 Ansari served as chairman of the Hajj committee of Jharkhand.

On 10 October 2010 he was named Minister for Minority Welfare in the Third Arjun Munda ministry. He thereby became the first Muslim minister in the government of Jharkhand. In August 2013 he was named Minister in the First Hemant Soren ministry. He was elected once more in the 2019 Jharkhand Legislative Assembly election. On 28 January 2020, he was appointed Minister of Minority Welfare and Registration in the Second Hemant Soren ministry.

== Personal life ==
Ansari underwent open-heart surgery in 2018. After attending the March 2020 Tablighi Jamaat in Delhi Ansari and his son went into quarantine. He tested positive for COVID-19 during the COVID-19 pandemic in India in September 2020, and entered the Medanta hospital in Ranchi. He died there on 3 October 2020, aged 70 or 73, due to cardiac arrest, the day after testing negative for COVID-19. After his death the Chief Minister of Jharkhand, Hemant Soren, announced a two-day state mourning period.

After his death, his son, Hafizul Hassan, was appointed minister on 5 February 2021. He obtained the portfolio's of tourism, arts and culture, youth affairs and sports, and minorities.
