= Deoghar College, Jharkhand =

Undergraduate and Postgraduate college affiliated to Sido Kanhu Murmu University

Deoghar College
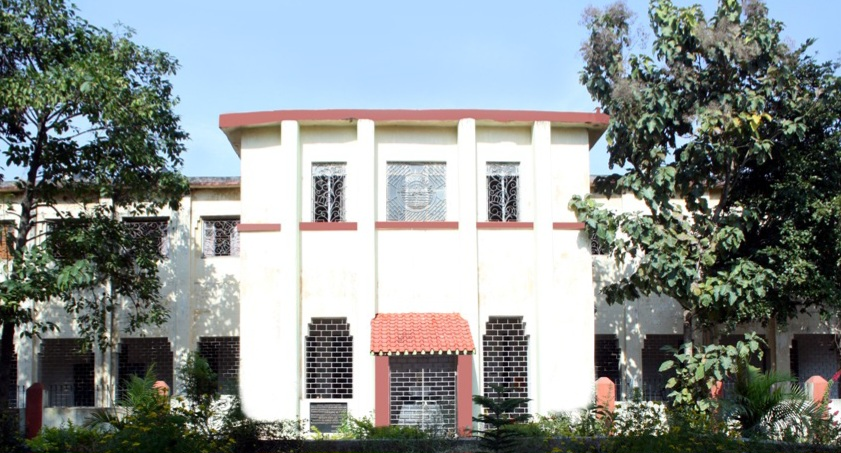
- Type: Undergraduate & Postgraduate college
- Established: 1951; 75 years ago
- Accreditation: NAAC
- Principal: Dr. Akhilesh Kumar
- Undergraduates: 6,205
- Postgraduates: 2,855
- Location: Deoghar, Jharkhand, India - 814112; 24.5093°N 86.6963°E
- Campus: Urban, 52 acres (21 ha)
- Affiliations: Sido Kanhu Murmu University
- Website: deogharcollegedeoghar.com
- Location in Jharkhand Deoghar College, Jharkhand (India)

Deoghar College, established in 1951, is a public general degree college situated near Deoghar Junction in Deoghar, Jharkhand. It offers undergraduate and postgraduate courses in arts, commerce and science. In addition, it also provides several vocational self-financed programs such as BBA, BCA and LLB. It is affiliated to Sido Kanhu Murmu University, and also officially recognised by UGC.

== History ==
The College was established on 1 August 1951, through the efforts of prominent educationists and philanthropists, including Pt. Binodanand Jha and Umapati Banerjee. The initiative to found the college began with a meeting held on 26 March 1948, chaired by Sri Krishna Nand Shahay, who also served as the institution's first principal. During this meeting, a resolution was passed to establish a college in Deoghar, reflecting the group's determination and dedication.

The college's foundation was supported by a voluntary contribution of Rs. 57,750 from the local community. Initial classes commenced in a rented house known as Rani Kothi. Over time, Deoghar College has grown to offer a range of academic programs, including undergraduate courses, postgraduate courses and self-financed programs such as B.B.A, B.C.A and L.L.B.

== Accreditation ==
Deoghar College was accredited by the National Assessment and Accreditation Council (NAAC) with 'B Level' certification. It is also officially recognized by University Grant Commission and is registered under 2(f) and 12(b) of the University Grants Commission Act.

== Courses ==
The college offers both undergraduate and postgraduate courses in science, arts and commerce across various streams. These are: B.Sc and M.Sc in science level, BA and MA in arts level and B.Com and M.Com in commerce level. Alongside it also offers professional courses like BBA, BCA and LLB.

== See also ==
- List of institutions of higher education in Jharkhand
- Education in Jharkhand
- Education in India
