= Madhupur Municipal Council =

Municipality in Jharkhand, India

Madhupur Municipal Council मधुपुर नगर परिषद
- Seal of the Madhupur Municipal Council

Type
- Type: Municipality

History
- Founded: 1909; 117 years ago

Leadership
- Chairman: Darakshan Parveen
- Vice Chairman: Rishabh Bharadwaj
- Executive Officer: Surendra Kumar Kisku, JAS
- Seats: 23

Elections
- Last election: 2026
- Next election: 2031

Meeting place
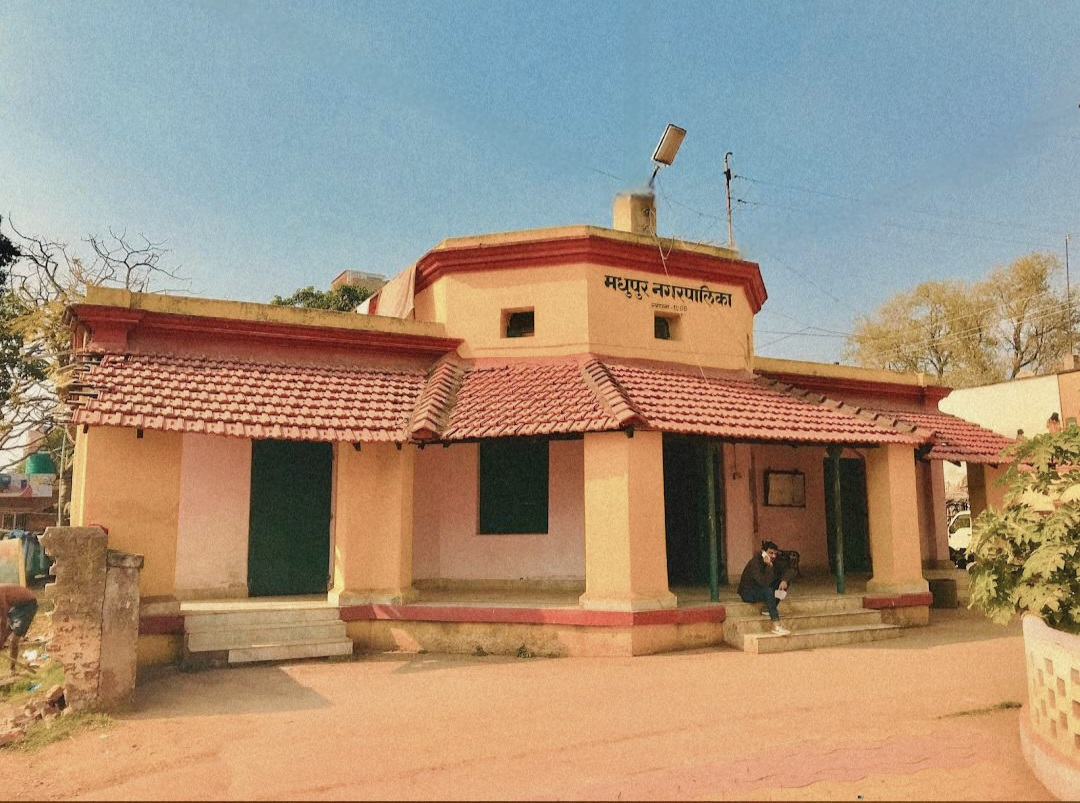
- Nagarpalika Road, Madhupur, Jharkhand, India - 815353

Website
- Official Website

Madhupur Municipal Council, also known as Madhupur Nagar Parishad, is the civic body that governs Madhupur and its surrounding areas in the Madhupur subdivision of Deoghar district, in the state of Jharkhand, India. It was established in 1909, making it the oldest municipality in Jharkhand. The municipality is divided into 23 wards, each represented by an elected ward councillor. It functions under the provisions of the Jharkhand Municipal Act, 2011.

== History ==
Madhupur Municipal Council was officially established on 3 April,1909 by the Government of Bengal through Notification No. 676-M, under the provisions of the Bengal Municipal Act. This made it one of the earliest statutory municipal bodies in the region. The town’s development was closely linked to the expansion of the East Indian Railway, which transformed it into a key junction and a popular health resort during the colonial era. Its salubrious climate attracted affluent families and officials, leading to the construction of several seasonal residences and public institutions.

A landmark moment in the municipality’s civic legacy was the visit of Mahatma Gandhi in 1917, when he addressed a public gathering at the Madhupur Town Hall. This event is commemorated locally as a historic occasion tied to India’s freedom movement.

By the 1971 Census, Madhupur Municipal Council covered an area of 23.31 km² and was divided into 16 wards, managing key civic services such as sanitation, primary education, water supply, and healthcare.

After the formation of state of Jharkhand on 15 November 2000 under Bihar Reorganisation Act, 2000, Madhupur Municipal Council became the part of newly created state of Jharkhand. At the time of Jharkhand’s creation, the Bihar Municipal Act, 1922 was adapted as the Jharkhand Municipal Act, 2000, which governed Madhupur Municipal Council along with other urban local bodies of the state. Later, with the enactment of the Jharkhand Municipal Act, 2011, the earlier acts ceased to apply and Madhupur Municipal Council has since been governed under the 2011 Act.

In 2020, Swachh Survekshan rankings, Madhupur Municipal Council was recognized for its efforts in sanitation and waste management. The city was ranked 10th overall in the Swachh Survekshan ranking. Additionally, it was also recognized as the "Best City in Citizen Feedback" in the East Zone of India for cities with a population between 50,000 and 1 lakh.

== Demographics ==
According to the 2011 Census of India, Madhupur Municipal Council had a population of 55,238, with 28,889 males and 26,349 females, and consisted of 9,796 households.

The literacy rate was recorded at 79.46% with male literacy at 86.46% and female literacy at 71.72%, significantly higher than the state average. The sex ratio stood at 912 females per 1,000 males, while the child sex ratio (age 0–6) was 965. Approximately 14.2% of the population was under the age of six.

As of now, the municipality has 23 wards, each represented by an elected municipal councillor.

== Administration ==
Madhupur Municipal Council is administratively divided into 23 wards with each ward represented by an elected councillor.The municipal council is headed by a Chairperson and a Vice-Chairperson, who preside over council meetings and oversee the functioning of the municipality. Darakshan Parveen has been serving as the Chairperson of Madhupur Municipal Council since March 2026, while Rishabh Bharadwaj serves as the Vice-Chairperson.

The day to day administrative functions are overseen by the Executive Officer (EO), a civil servant appointed by the Government of Jharkhand. The EO acts as the chief administrative officer and is responsible for the implementation of municipal policies, maintenance of civic services, and issuing vital documents such as birth and death certificates, trade licences etc

The municipality is responsible for providing essential civic amenities, which include:

- Water supply and sanitation
- Solid waste management
- Street lighting
- Maintenance of public roads and marketplaces
- Regulation of building construction and land use within municipal limits
- Holding tax collection

== List of ward councillors ==
The following are the ward councillors elected in the 2026 Madhupur Municipal Council election:

Ward No.	Councillor	Reservation
1	Md. Shahid Imtiyaz	Extremely Backward Class-I
2	Md. Saif Ansari	Extremely Backward Class-I
3	Mu. Naushad Alam	Unreserved
4	Md. Sajjad Hussain	Extremely Backward Class-I
5	Azhar Ullah	Unreserved
6	Gaurav Kumar	Unreserved
7	Manju Devi	Scheduled Caste
8	Sakeela Khatoon	Extremely Backward Class-I
9	Ramesh Kumar	Scheduled Caste
10	Jarifa Khatun	Extremely Backward Class-I
11	Gautam Kumar	Backward Class-II
12	Veena Devi Bathwal	Unreserved
13	Md. Rizwan	Unreserved
14	Anju Yadav	Backward Class-II
15	Soni Devi	Unreserved
16	Ruhi Pravin	Unreserved
17	Shabnam Ansari	Extremely Backward Class-I
18	Jahan Ara	Unreserved
19	Rajesh Kumar Das	Unreserved
20	Sunita Singh	Unreserved
21	Daulti Devi	Unreserved
22	Rishabh Bharadwaj	Unreserved
23	Mukesh Marandi	Scheduled Tribe
