= Madhupur College, Jharkhand =

Undergraduate college affiliated to Sido Kanhu Murmu University

Madhupur College
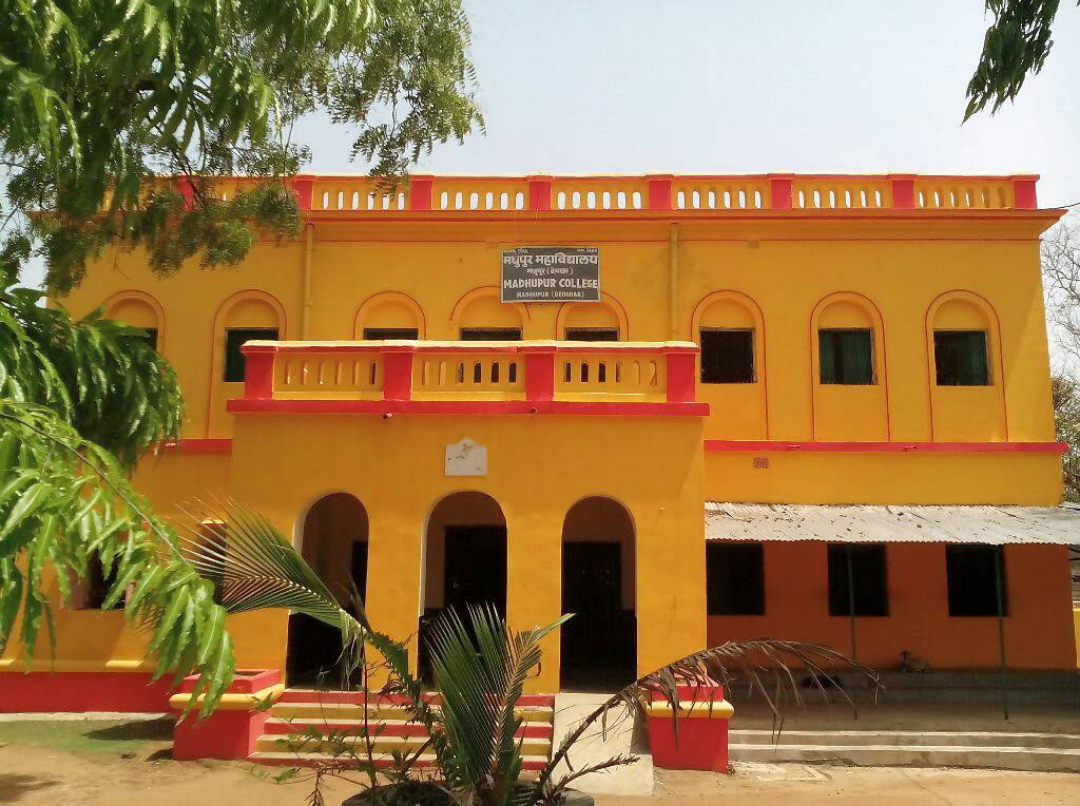
- Type: Public
- Established: 1966; 60 years ago
- Accreditation: NAAC
- Affiliations: Sido Kanhu Murmu University
- Principal: Dr Ratnakar Bharti
- Undergraduates: 5,000
- Location: Madhupur, Jharkhand, India; 24°15′33″N 86°38′27″E
- Campus: 3.45 acres (1.40 ha); Urban
- Website: https://madhupurcollege.com
- Location within Jharkhand Location within India

Madhupur College, established in 1966, is a public general degree college in Madhupur, Jharkhand, India. It offers undergraduate courses in arts, commerce and sciences. It is affiliated to Sido Kanhu Murmu University, and also officially recognised by UGC.

== History ==
The college was established in 1966 with some social workers, politicians, administrators and Educationist like Yasin Ansari, Ajit kr. Banerjee, Moti Lal Dalmiya, Dwarika Prasad Gutgutia, Ram Krishna Choudhary and Prahlad Modi who with their efforts made a resolution to begin this college at than existing Edward Gorge High School now known as Shyama Prasad Mukherjee High school. Soon after their efforts the crowdfunding began from each and every citizen of Madhupur town began, which ultimately made it possible to have its own campus. The land was purchased from the Jharia Maharaja. The names like K.D. Singh, then SDO, the Railway Magistrate Kesav Prasad, the B.D.O, Sri Rama Nand Singh, The C.O, Sri Kamaldeo Prasad Sharma, The officer-in-charge, Moojee Lala Singh had their immense role in overall upliftment of the college infrastructure.

In 1970, it got its affiliation from Tilka Manjhi Bhagalpur University, later, on 10 January 1992, The Sido Kanhu Murmu University was established by amending the Bihar State Universities Act 1976 (Bihar Act 23/1976) in the Bihar Legislative Assembly. The amendment primarily changed the jurisdiction of the Bhagalpur University by bifurcating the six districts of Santhal Parganas which now came under the jurisdiction of the new university; and needless to say, Madhupur College became a constituent unit of this university. After the division of Bihar on 15 November 2000, Madhupur College along with its parent University came under administrative jurisdiction of the state of Jharkhand.

== Accreditation ==
Madhupur College was accredited by the National Assessment and Accreditation Council (NAAC) with 'B Level' certification. It is also officially recognized by University Grants Commission and is registered under section 2(f) and 12(b) of the University Grants Commission Act.

== Courses ==
The college offers undergraduate in science, arts and commerce across various streams. These are: B.Sc., B.Sc. (Hons), B.A, B.A (Hons), B.Com., B.Com. (Hons) at the UG level

== See also ==
- List of institutions of higher education in Jharkhand
- Education in Jharkhand
- Education in India
