= Pathrol Kali Temple, Madhupur =

Hindu temple in Jharkhand, India

Pathrol Kali Temple
- पथरोल काली मंदिर
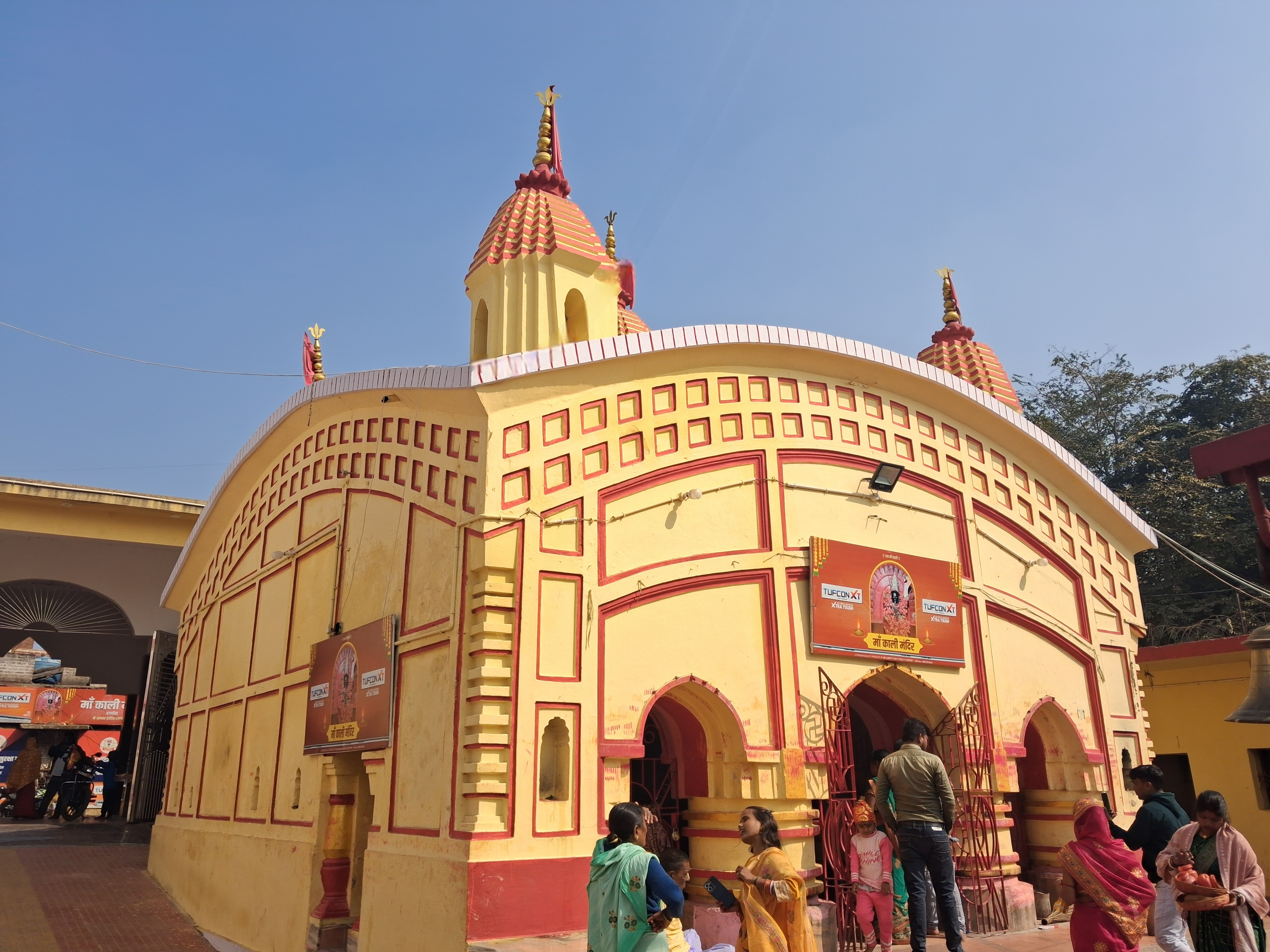
- Pathrol Kali Temple

- Location in Madhupur, Deoghar, Jharkhand

Religion
- Affiliation: Hinduism
- District: Deoghar
- Deity: Dakhshina Kali
- Festivals: Kali Puja; Durga Puja

Location
- Location: Madhupur
- State: Jharkhand
- Country: India
- Interactive map of Pathrol Kali Temple
- Coordinates: 24°14′41″N 86°42′07″E

Website
- Official website

Maa Pathrol Kali Temple (Hindi: माँ पथरोल काली) is a hindu temple located in Madhupur, Deoghar in the Santhal Parganas division of the state of Jharkhand, India. It is roughly 7 km from the Madhupur Town. The temple consists of a shrine dedicated to Goddess Kali. It is one of the oldest and sacred temple in Madhupur which was built by Raja Digvijay Singh about 6 to 7 centuries ago. Worship is held every day from Monday to Sunday. Animals are sacrificed as part of worship. There are nine more temple close to the main temple. An Annual fair is held every year during the month of Kartik (Oct - Nov) where thousands and thousands, of Pilgrims and devotees gather here for the worship and to witness the fair.
