= Lakhanpahari =

Lakhanpahari Lakhanpur
- village
- Location in Jharkhand, India
- Coordinates: 24.9352347°N 87.2444181999999°E
- Country: India

Area
  - Total: 2.01 km^{2} (0.78 sq mi)

Population (2011)
  - Total: 1,427
  - Density: 710/km^{2} (1,840/sq mi)

Languages
  - Official: Angika, Hindi
- Time zone: UTC+5:30 (IST)
- PIN: 814147
- Telephone code: +91
- Vehicle registration: JH-17
- Literacy: 78 per cent

Lakhanpahari is a village of Godda district.

== Nature of Lakhanpahari ==
The area of Lakhanpahari is surrounded with hills.
