= Madhupur Assembly constituency =

Constituency of the Jharkhand legislative assembly in India

Coordinates: 24.27°N 86.64°E

Madhupur
- Constituency No. 13 for the Jharkhand Legislative Assembly

Constituency details
- Country: India
- Region: East India
- State: Jharkhand
- District: Deoghar
- Lok Sabha constituency: Godda
- Established: 2000
- Reservation: None

Member of Legislative Assembly
- 5th Jharkhand Legislative Assembly
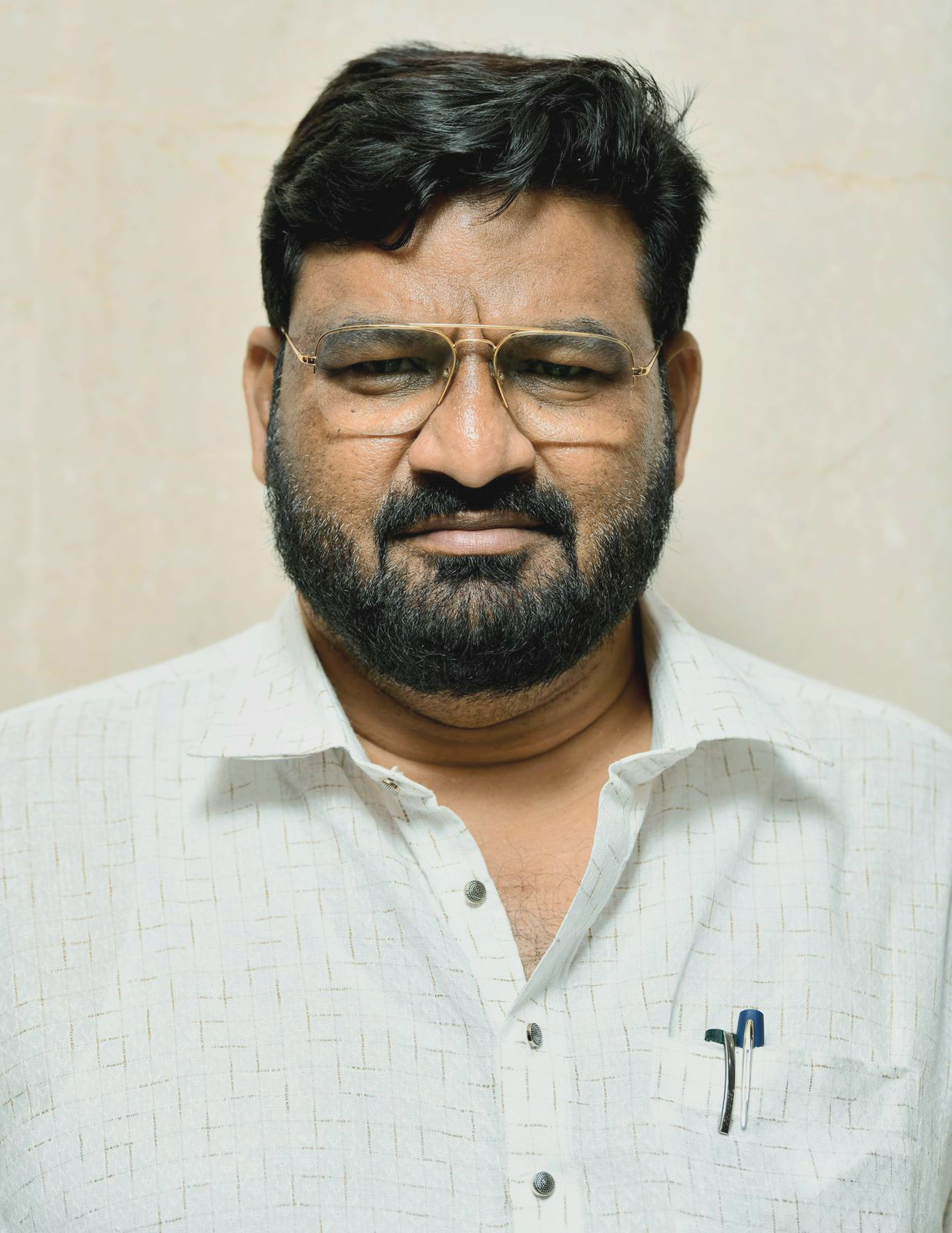
- Incumbent Hafizul Hasan
- Party: JMM
- Alliance: MGB
- Elected year: 2024

Madhupur Assembly constituency is a Legislative Assembly constituency of Deoghar district in the Indian state of Jharkhand.

== Overview ==
Madhupur Assembly constituency covers: Madhupur and Karon Police Stations and Kusmil, Chanddih, Pathra and Basbariya gram panchayats in Jasidih Police Station in Deoghar district.

Madhupur Assembly constituency is part of Godda (Lok Sabha constituency). It is also a part of Deogarh pranav.

== Members of the Legislative Assembly ==
Election	Member	Party
Bihar Legislative Assembly
Before 1957: see Madhupur cum Sarath constituency
1957-62: Constituency did not exist
1962	Chhattu Turi	Swatantra Party
1967	Ajit Kumar Banerjee	Bharatiya Jana Sangh
1969	Bhageshwar Prasad Moul	Indian National Congress
1972	Ajit Kumar Banerjee	Bharatiya Jana Sangh
1977	Ajit Kumar Banerjee	Janata Party
1980	Krishna Nand Jha	Indian National Congress
1985	Krishna Nand Jha	Indian National Congress
1990	Uday Shankar Jha	Indian National Congress
1995	Haji Hussain Ansari	Jharkhand Mukti Morcha
2000	Haji Hussain Ansari	Jharkhand Mukti Morcha
Jharkhand Legislative Assembly
2005	Raj Paliwar	Bharatiya Janata Party
2009	Haji Hussain Ansari	Jharkhand Mukti Morcha
2014	Raj Paliwar	Bharatiya Janata Party
2019	Haji Hussain Ansari	Jharkhand Mukti Morcha
2021^	Hafizul Hasan	Jharkhand Mukti Morcha
2024	Hafizul Hasan	Jharkhand Mukti Morcha

^by-election

== Election results ==
=== Assembly Election 2024 ===
2024 Jharkhand Legislative Assembly election: Madhupur
Party	Candidate	Votes	%	±%
JMM	Hafizul Hasan	143,953	50.97%	▲1.88
BJP	Ganga Narayan Singh	1,23,926	43.88%	▼2.88
Independent	Sahud Mian	3,399	1.20%	New
Independent	Subodh Kumar Rajhans	1,720	0.61%	New
BSP	Md Jiyaul Hak	1,674	0.59%	New
NOTA	None of the Above	3,657	1.29%	▼0.97
Margin of victory		20,027	7.09%	▲4.77
Turnout		2,82,427	76.67%	▲6.65
Registered electors		3,68,385		▲14.26
JMM hold		Swing	▲1.88	

=== Assembly By-election 2021 ===
2021 Jharkhand Legislative Assembly by-election: Madhupur
Party	Candidate	Votes	%	±%
JMM	Hafizul Hasan	110,812	49.09%	▲10.69
BJP	Ganga Narayan Singh	1,05,565	46.76%	▲18.42
Independent	Ashok Kumar Thakur	3,924	1.74%	New
Independent	Rajendra Kumar	2,409	1.07%	New
Independent	Uttam Kumar Yadav	2,003	0.89%	New
NOTA	Nota	5,123	2.27%	▲0.30
Margin of victory		5,247	2.32%	▼7.73
Turnout		2,25,746	71.62%	▼3.78
Registered electors		3,22,407		▲3.68
JMM hold		Swing	▲10.69	

=== Assembly Election 2019 ===
2019 Jharkhand Legislative Assembly election: Madhupur
Party	Candidate	Votes	%	±%
JMM	Haji Hussain Ansari	88,115	38.40%	▲4.53
BJP	Raj Paliwar	65,046	28.34%	▼8.98
AJSU	Ganga Narayan Ray	45,620	19.88%	New
AIMIM	Md. Ikbal	9,866	4.30%	New
JVM(P)	Sahim Khan	4,222	1.84%	▼11.09
Independent	Budhdev Murmu	2,241	0.98%	New
BSP	Sanjay Kumar Singh	2,038	0.89%	▼0.88
NOTA	Nota	4,520	1.97%	New
Margin of victory		23,069	10.05%	▲6.60
Turnout		2,29,491	73.80%	▲2.80
Registered electors		3,10,976		▲10.87
JMM gain from BJP		Swing	▲1.07	

=== Assembly Election 2014 ===
2014 Jharkhand Legislative Assembly election: Madhupur
Party	Candidate	Votes	%	±%
BJP	Raj Paliwar	74,325	37.32%	▲19.08
JMM	Hafizul Hasan	67,441	33.87%	▲1.42
JVM(P)	Sahim Khan	25,756	12.93%	▼5.64
INC	Faiyaj Kaisar	8,937	4.49%	▼4.10
BSP	Manish Kumar	3,514	1.76%	New
Independent	Rajesh Tripathi	2,905	1.46%	New
Independent	Ram Prasad Singh	2,828	1.42%	New
NOTA	None of the Above	3,300	1.66%	New
Margin of victory		6,884	3.46%	▼10.41
Turnout		1,99,134	71.00%	▲10.24
Registered electors		2,80,478		▲15.48
BJP gain from JMM		Swing	▲4.88	

=== Assembly Election 2009 ===
2009 Jharkhand Legislative Assembly election: Madhupur
Party	Candidate	Votes	%	±%
JMM	Haji Hussain Ansari	47,880	32.45%	▲4.31
JVM(P)	Shiv Dutt Sharma	27,412	18.58%	New
BJP	Avishek Anand Jha	26,915	18.24%	▼14.35
INC	Salauddin Ansari	12,678	8.59%	New
Independent	Kundan Kumar Bhaghat	5,296	3.59%	New
Independent	Rajesh Thakur	3,149	2.13%	New
Independent	Ganga Narayan Ray	2,605	1.77%	New
Margin of victory		20,468	13.87%	▲9.41
Turnout		1,47,566	60.76%	▼2.29
Registered electors		2,42,870		▲2.35
JMM gain from BJP		Swing	▼0.14	

=== Assembly Election 2005 ===
2005 Jharkhand Legislative Assembly election: Madhupur
Party	Candidate	Votes	%	±%
BJP	Raj Paliwar	48,756	32.59%	▲6.48
JMM	Haji Hussain Ansari	42,089	28.13%	▼2.44
BSP	Saheem Khan	25,506	17.05%	New
Independent	Rajesh Thakur	10,385	6.94%	New
RJD	Jawahar Prasad Singh	5,989	4.00%	▼0.72
Jharkhand Vananchal Congress	Surendra Rawani	2,927	1.96%	New
Independent	Santosh Kumar Modi	2,278	1.52%	New
Margin of victory		6,667	4.46%	▼0.01
Turnout		1,49,610	63.05%	▲2.36
Registered electors		2,37,299		▲22.93
BJP gain from JMM		Swing	▲2.02	

=== Assembly Election 2000 ===
2000 Bihar Legislative Assembly election: Madhupur
Party	Candidate	Votes	%	±%
JMM	Haji Hussain Ansari	35,811	30.57%	New
BJP	Vishakha Singh	30,579	26.10%	New
INC	Krishnanand Jha	20,782	17.74%	New
Independent	Arvind Yadav	6,279	5.36%	New
Independent	Sitaram Sah	5,602	4.78%	New
RJD	Salauddin Ansari	5,537	4.73%	New
Independent	Surendra Rawani	3,788	3.23%	New
Margin of victory		5,232	4.47%	
Turnout		1,17,143	61.46%	
Registered electors		1,93,038		
JMM win (new seat)				

== See also ==
- Madhupur (community development block)
- Karon
- List of states of India by type of legislature
