= Godda =

- Town
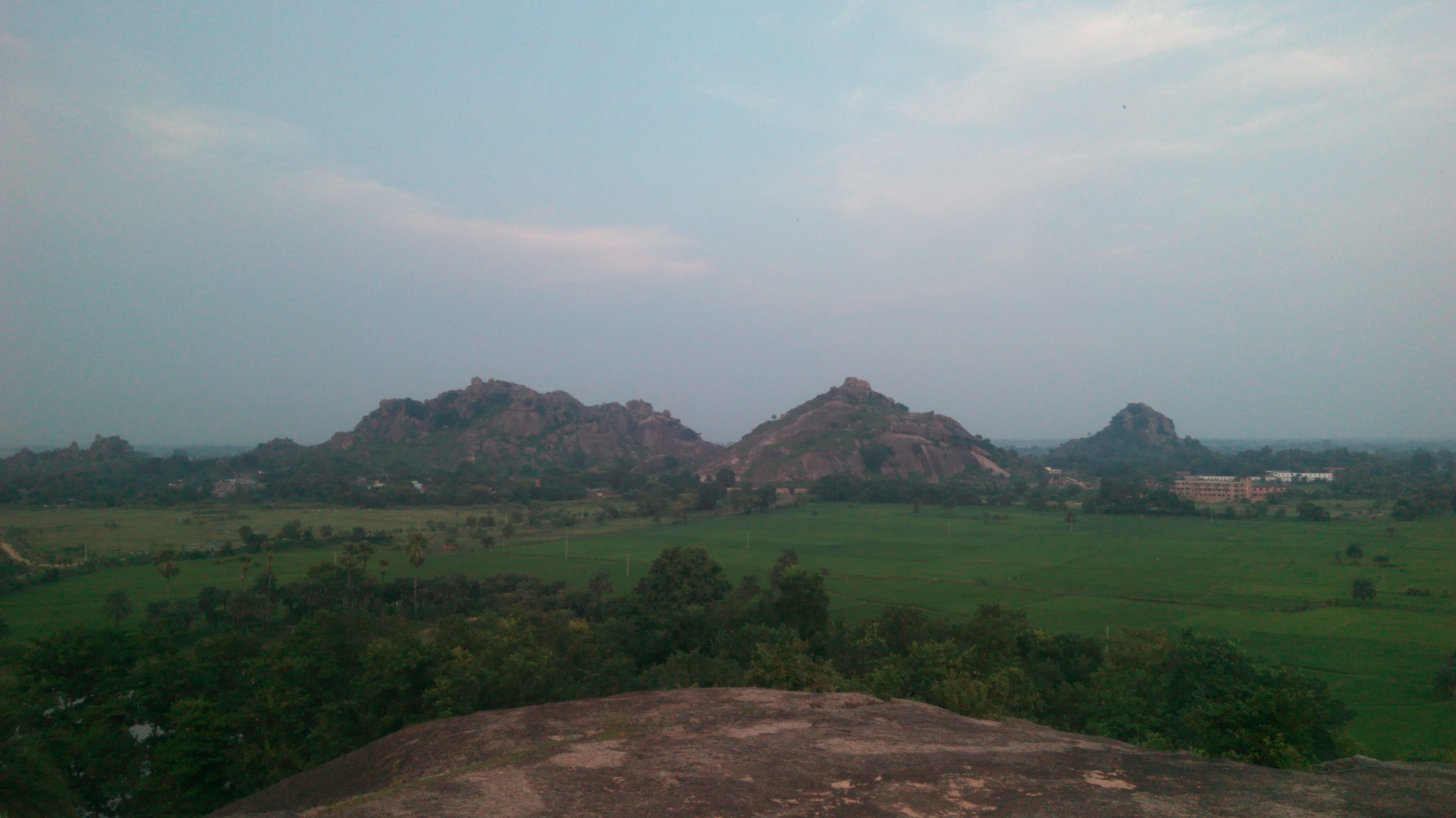
- View of Manokamna Hill in Lakhanpahari

- Location in Jharkhand, India Godda (India)
- Coordinates: 24.83°N 87.22°E
- Country: India
- State: Jharkhand
- District: Godda
- Established: 04/11/1993

Government
  - Type: Municipal governance in India
  - Body: Godda municipal council

Area
  - Total: 8.59 km^{2} (3.32 sq mi)
- Elevation: 87 m (285 ft)

Population (2011)
  - Total: 48,480
  - Density: 5,640/km^{2} (14,600/sq mi)

Languages (*For language details see Godda (community development block)#Language and religion)
  - Official: Hindi, Urdu
  - Regional: Mondarika-Maithili
- Time zone: UTC+5:30 (IST)
- PIN: 814133
- Telephone code: 06422
- Vehicle registration: JH-17
- Website: godda.nic.in

Godda is a town with a municipal council in the Godda subdivision of the Godda district in Jharkhand, India. It is also the administrative headquarters of the Godda district.

== Geography ==
Cities, towns and locations in the Sahibganj, Godda and Pakur districts in Santhal Pargana Division
M: municipality, CT: census town, R: rural/ urban centre, H: historical/ religious/ tourist centre
Owing to space constraints in the small map, the actual locations in a larger map may vary slightly

=== Location ===
Godda is located at 24.83°N 87.22°E. It has an average elevation of 77 metres (252 feet). Godda came into existence as the 55th district of Bihar on 25 May 1983. After the bifurcation of Bihar into Jharkhand state on 15 November 2000, it was one of 18 districts of Jharkhand.

=== Overview ===
Godda lies in a hilly area with the Rajmahal hills running from the bank of the Ganges from north to south. It is close to the Farakka Barrage, just inside West Bengal; the Rajmahal coalfield is also nearby. The area around Godda is overwhelmingly rural with only small pockets of urbanisation.

== Demographics ==
=== Population ===
Historical population
Year	Pop.	±%
1961	7,500	—
1971	9,733	+29.8%
1981	14,917	+53.3%
1991	23,637	+58.5%
2001	37,008	+56.6%
2011	48,480	+31.0%
Source: Census of India

According to the 2011 Census of India, Godda had a total population of 48,480, of which 25,707 (53%) were males and 22,773 (47%) were females. The population in the age range 0–6 years was 6,745. The total number of literate persons in Godda was 41,735 (84.30% of the population over 6 years).

== Infrastructure ==
According to the District Census Handbook 2011, Godda, the urban area of Godda covered an area of 8.59 km^{2}. Panjwara Road railway station on the Dumka-Bhagalpur line is 20 km away. Among the civic amenities, the town had 17.1 km roads with open drains. The protected water supply includes hand pumps, and uncovered wells. Residences in Godda have 7,319 domestic electric connections, and there are 350 road light points around the town.

== Economy ==
Traditionally, Godda produced pattal (leaf plates), and furniture. During the late 20th century, Godda saw industrialization and many major industrial projects came to the town. Jindal Steel & Powers at Tesubathan (Sunderpahari) constructed a 1320 MW capacity thermal power plant. Adani Power is establishing its 1600 MW thermal power plant at Godda and it will become India's first power sector Special Economic Zone.

Rajmahal Coal Mining Ltd, a subsidiary of Aditya Birla Groups operates the mine of Eastern Coalfields at Mahagama.

== Transport ==
=== Roadways ===
- NH 133
- NH 333A

=== Railway ===
The Godda railway station is situated around 4 km from the city centre. Humsafar Express was the first train to depart from the Godda railway station on 8 April 2021.

=== Airways ===
- Bhagalpur Airport situated in Bhagalpur (Bihar) is the nearest airport (is 65 Km away from Godda).
- Dumka Airport is 86 Km away from Godda.
- Deoghar Airport is 87 Km away from Godda.
- Jay Prakash Narayan Airport, Patna is 291 Km away from Godda.
- Birsa Munda Airport, Ranchi is 331 Km away from Godda.

== Notable people ==
- Bhagwat Jha Azad: Former chief minister of Bihar
- Rameshwar Thakur: Former governor of Madhya Pradesh
- Kirti Azad: Former cricketer, Team India.
- Rashmi Jha: Bollywood actress
- Bhumika Chawla: Bollywood actress
- Hemant Choudhary: Hindi TV and Bollywood actor
- Anil Kumar Jha: Former chairman, Coal India Limited
- Pradeep Yadav: MLA, Poreyahat
- Dipika Pandey Singh: MLA, Mahagama
- Raghu Nandan Mandal: Former MLA, Godda
- Amit Kumar Mandal: MLA, Godda
