= Carmel School, Madhupur =

Private convent school in Jharkhand, India

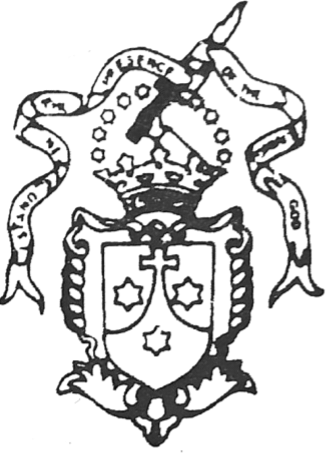

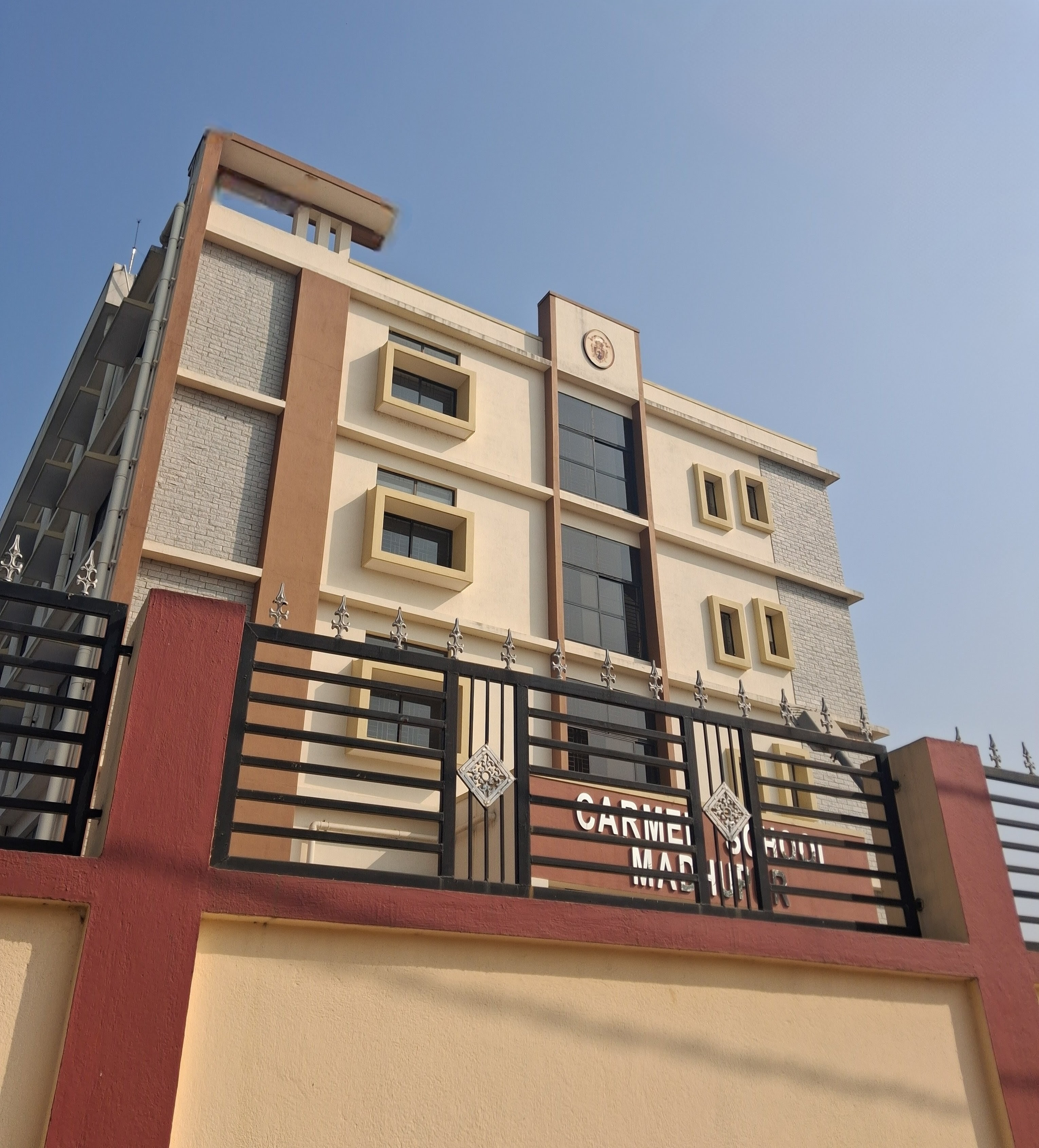
- Front view of Carmel School, Madhupur

Location
- Tilliyatand; Madhupur, Jharkhand, 815353; India; 24.2740°N 86.64°E

Information
- School type: Co-Educational Convent Private
- Religious affiliation: Roman Catholic
- Established: 1959; 67 years ago
- Founder: Mother Teresa of St. Rose of Lima
- Status: Active
- School board: ICSE
- School district: Deoghar
- Authority: Carmelite Sisters of St. Teresa (CSST)
- School code: JH027
- Principal: Sr. Savina , C.S.S.T
- Classes offered: Nursery – 10
- Language: English
- Schedule type: Morning
- Hours in school day: 5–6 hrs
- Campus type: Urban
- Houses: Saffron Blue Red Green
- Song: Aiming High
- National ranking: In Top 1000
- Affiliation: Council for the Indian School Certificate Examinations
- Website: carmelschoolmadhupur.com

Carmel School Madhupur (also known as Carmel Convent School, Madhupur) is a private convent school located in the town of Madhupur in the Deoghar district of Jharkhand, India. It is a fully-fledged co-educational, day school affiliated to Council for the Indian School Certificate Examinations (CISCE), New Delhi and offers education to students from Grade LKG to Grade X. The medium of instruction for all classes is English. The school provides a hostel for girls. The boys attend the school as day scholars. The students of Carmel School are referred to as Carmelites.

== History ==
The school was established on June 17, 1959 by the Carmelite Sisters of St. Teresa (CSST) a community started by Mother Teresa of St. Rose of Lima. The school opened with just 4 pupils. With the continuous efforts of Mother Xaveria, by the end of the year, there were 60 pupils and 6 classes. The school was the first school in the region to impart education in English medium to the pupils. As of July 2021, Sr. Pushpa is the principal of the school.

== Campus and Infrastructure ==
The school is located in Tilliyatand, Madhupur near national highway NH114A

The school building complex consists of multiple classrooms, administrative offices, and an auditorium. The auditorium is well equipped with PA System and has a stage for plays and performances. The auditorium is also used for annual gatherings and debate competitions.

The School has well-equipped laboratories for course-related practical work. There are four laboratories within the School - Physics, Chemistry, Biology, and Computer. The school has two Basketball Court for the student. The library is also well equipped with reference books and caters to students of all grades.

== Nature ==
The school is owned and administered by the Carmelite Sisters of St. Teresa, Northern Province. The school is affiliated to the Council for the Indian School Certificate Examinations, (CISCE ) New Delhi. It prepares the students for the ICSE board examination conducted by Council for the Indian School Certificate Examinations (CISCE) New Delhi.

== Curriculum ==
The school is affiliated with the Council for the Indian School Certificate Examinations, New Delhi, and prepares the students for the ICSE board examination for class X. The classes are from Nursery to Class X. Admission for new students starts in December and the new session starts from the second half of March. It is co-educational and instruction is primarily in English. There are separate campus for kindergarten, Primary, and higher secondary section in the campus.

== Facilities ==
The school's facilities include a computer laboratory, science laboratories, a library, a playground, and a multipurpose hall used for recreational and educational activities. Classrooms are fitted with smart class equipment.
