= Raghu Nandan Mandal =

Indian politician

Raghunandan Mandal
- Born: 4 February 1952; Bhagalpur, Bihar India
- Died: 3 January 2016 (aged 63); Jharkhand, India
- Education: BSC
- Alma mater: Marwari College, Bhagalpur
- Occupations: Businessperson, agriculturist & politician
- Years active: 2014 – 2016
- Political party: BJP, (Bharatiya Janata Party)
- Spouse: Sulochana Mandal
- Children: 2 sons, 1 daughter
- Parent(s): Late Sumrit Mandal (ex-MLA) (father) & Phulwati Devi (mother).

Raghunandan Mandal (4 February 1952 – 3 January 2016) was an Indian politician who was a Member of Legislative Assembly from 17 Godda District in Jharkhand from BJP(Bharatiya Janata Party). Mandal overcame his Rashtriya Janata Dal (RJD) rival Sanjay Prasad Yadav by 34,486 votes. He was also elected as The Assembly committee member on environment and pollution control of jharkhand.

== Education and background ==
He graduated in 1971 with a BSc from Marwari College, Bhagalpur University. He was a businessman by profession and an agriculturalist. He was the director of Sumrit Mandal Company PVT LTD before entering politics.

== Personal life ==
He was born to Sumrit Mandal and Phulwati Devi. His father was also a Member of Legislative assembly from 17 Godda District in Jharkhand representing JMM (Jharkhand Mukti Morcha) during the period (1985–1995). He studied at Ranchi Vikas Vidyalaya. Mandal has been married to Sulochana Mandal since 30 January 1979. They have three children, two sons Amit and Sumit and a daughter named Puja. He died while being taken to a hospital in Jharkhand in 2016 after complaining of chest pains.
