= Kumradol railway station =

Railway station in Jharkhand

Kumradol

General information
- Location: Kumradol, Godda district, Jharkhand; India
- Coordinates: 24.695171°N 87.07556°E
- Elevation: 159 metres (522 ft)
- System: Indian Railways station
- Owner: Indian Railways
- Operator: Eastern Railway zone
- Line: Dumka–Bhagalpur line
- Platforms: 1
- Tracks: 2

Construction
- Structure type: At–grade
- Parking: Available

Other information
- Status: Functioning
- Station code: KADL
- Zone(s): Eastern Railway zone
- Division(s): Malda
- Fare zone: Indian Railways

History
- Opened: 1907
- Rebuilt: 2012–15

Services
Preceding station	Indian Railways	Following station
Hansdiha towards ?	Eastern Railway zone Dumka–Bhagalpur line	Danre Halt towards ?
Location
- Location within Jharkhand

Kumradol railway station is an Indian railway station on the Dumka–Bhagalpur line of the Sahibganj loop of the Malda railway division in the Eastern Railway zone. The station is situated at Kumradol in Godda district in the Indian state of Jharkhand.

== History ==
The metre-gauge railway track from Bhagalpur Junction railway station to Mandar Hill railway station branch was opened in 1907. The branch was converted to broad gauge. A new railway line from Mandar Hill to Hansdiha became operational on 23 December 2012 and the Dumka to Barapalasi route was reconstructed in June 2014. The full track finally became operational in 2015.

== Station layout ==
G	Street level	Exit/Entrance & ticket counter
P1	Side platform, No-1 doors will open on the left/right
P1	Track 1	Bhagalpur ← toward → Dumka

== See also ==
- Dumka
- Indian Railways
- Dumka
- Jasidih Junction
- Jasidih–Dumka–Rampurhat line
- Rampurhat Junction
- List of railway stations in India
- Dumka Airport
