= Howrah–Jamalpur Vande Bharat Express =

Mini Vande Bharat Express train route in India

Howrah Junction – Jamalpur Junction Vande Bharat Express

Overview
- Service type: Vande Bharat Express
- Locale: West Bengal, Jharkhand and Bihar
- First service: 15 September 2024 (Inaugural); 17 September 2024; 2 years ago (Commercial)
- Current operator: Eastern Railways (ER)

Route
- Termini: Howrah Junction (HWH); Jamalpur Junction (JMP)
- Stops: 08
- Distance travelled: 440 km (273 mi)
- Average journey time: 06 hrs 30 mins
- Service frequency: Six days a week (Note: Except Fridays)
- Train number: 22309 / 22310
- Lines used: Howrah–Rampurhat Jn. line; Rampurhat–Dumka line; Dumka–Bhagalpur line; Bhagalpur–Jamalpur line

On-board services
- Classes: AC Chair Car, AC Executive Chair Car
- Seating arrangements: Airline style; Rotatable seats
- Sleeping arrangements: No
- Catering facilities: On-board catering
- Observation facilities: Large windows in all coaches
- Entertainment facilities: On-board WiFi; Infotainment system; Electric outlets; Reading light; Seat pockets; Bottle holder; Tray table
- Baggage facilities: Overhead racks
- Other facilities: Kavach

Technical
- Rolling stock: Mini Vande Bharat 2.0
- Track gauge: Indian gauge
- Electrification: 25 kV 50 Hz AC overhead line
- Operating speed: 68 km/h (42 mph) (Avg.)
- Average length: 192 metres (630 ft) (08 coaches)
- Track owner: Indian Railways
- Rake maintenance: Howrah Jn (HWH)

The 22309/22310 Howrah–Jamalpur Vande Bharat Express is India's 60th Vande Bharat Express train, connecting the metropolitan capital city of Kolkata in West Bengal with Jamalpur, best known for its historic Jamalpur Locomotive Workshop in Bihar. This Vande Bharat has mainly become famous because of Rampurhat Junction,Which is well known for Tarapith devotees.

This express train was inaugurated on September 15, 2024, by Prime Minister Narendra Modi via video conferencing from the capital city of Ranchi instead of physically inaugurating at Tatanagar Junction in Jharkhand due to continuous rains in Jamshedpur. It previously ran between Howrah and Bhagalpur Junction, and was later extended to run to Jamalpur Junction.

This train is currently operated by Indian Railways, connecting Howrah Jn, Bolpur Shantiniketan, Rampurhat Junction, Dumka, Nonihat Bhaturia, Hansdiha, Mandar Hill, Barahat Junction, Bhagalpur Junction and Jamalpur Junction. It currently operates with train numbers 22309/22310 on 6 days a week basis.

== Rakes ==
It is the fifty-seventh 2nd Generation and fortieth Mini Vande Bharat 2.0 Express train which was designed and manufactured by the Integral Coach Factory at Perambur, Chennai under the Make in India initiative.

== Service ==
The 22309/22310 Howrah–Jamalpur Vande Bharat Express currently operates 6 days a week, covering a distance of 440 km (273 mi) in a travel time of 06 hrs 30 mins with average speed of 68 km/h. The Maximum Permissible Speed (MPS) is 130 km/h (81 mph).

== Schedule ==
The schedule of this 22309/22310 Howrah–Jamalpur Vande Bharat Express is given below:-

HWH–JMP–HWH Vande Bharat Express
22309 (Except Friday)		Stations	22310 (Except Friday)	
Arrival	Departure	Stations	Arrival	Departure
-NIL-	07:45	Howrah Junction	22:05	-NIL-
09:13	09:15	Bolpur Shantiniketan	19:45	19:47
10:00	10:02	Rampurhat Junction	19:07	19:09
11:03	11:05	Dumka	18:15	18:17
11:25	11:27	Nonihat Bhaturia	17:35	17:37
11:46	11:48	Hansdiha	17:20	17:22
12:12	12:14	Mandar Hill	16:57	16:59
12:27	12:29	Barahat Junction	16:41	16:43
13:03	13:05	Bhagalpur Junction	16:05	16:07
-NIL-	14:15	Jamalpur Junction	-NIL-	15:30

== See also ==
- Vande Bharat Express
- Tejas Express
- Gatiman Express
- Howrah Junction railway station
- Rampurhat Junction railway station
- Bhagalpur Junction railway station
- Jamalpur Junction railway station
