= Kurmahat railway station =

Railway station in Jharkhand

Kurmahat

General information
- Location: Dumka–Hansdiha Road, Kunji, Kurmahat, Dumka district, Jharkhand; India
- Coordinates: 24.531536°N 87.115286°E
- Elevation: 182 metres (597 ft)
- System: Indian Railways station
- Owner: Indian Railways
- Operator: Eastern Railway zone
- Line: Dumka–Bhagalpur line
- Platforms: 1
- Tracks: 2

Construction
- Structure type: At–grade
- Parking: Available

Other information
- Status: Functioning
- Station code: KUMT
- Zone(s): Eastern Railway zone
- Division(s): Malda
- Fare zone: Indian Railways

History
- Opened: 1907
- Rebuilt: 2012–15

Services
Preceding station	Indian Railways	Following station
Nonihat towards ?	Eastern Railway zone Dumka–Bhagalpur line	Hansdiha towards ?
Location

Kurmahat railway station is a railway station on the Dumka–Bhagalpur line of Sahibganj loop under Malda railway division of the Eastern Railway Zone. The station is situated beside Dumka–Hansdiha Road, Kunji at Kurmahat in Dumka district in the Indian state of Jharkhand.

== History ==
The metre-gauge railway track from Bhagalpur Junction railway station to Mandar Hill railway station branch was opened in 1907. The branch was converted to broad gauge. A new railway line from Mandar Hill to Hansdiha became operational on 23 December 2012 and Dumka to Barapalasi route was reconstructed in June 2014 and finally the full track became operational in 2015.
