= Chandanpahari railway station =

Railway station in Jharkhand

General information
- Location: Jardaha, Chandanpahari, Dumka district, Jharkhand; India
- Coordinates: 24.404224°N 87.953082°E
- Elevation: 233 metres (764 ft)
- System: Indian Railways station
- Owner: Indian Railways
- Line: Jasidih–Dumka–Rampurhat line
- Platforms: 1
- Tracks: 1 (Single electric line)

Construction
- Structure type: Standard (on-ground station)
- Cycle facilities: No

Other information
- Status: Functioning
- Station code: CNPI
- Zone(s): Eastern Railway
- Division(s): Asansol

History
- Opened: 2014–15

Services
Preceding station	Indian Railways	Following station
Basukinath towards ?	South Eastern Railway zone Rampurhat–Jasidih line	Ghormara towards ?
Location

Chandanpahari railway station is a railway station on the Jasidih–Dumka–Rampurhat line under the Asansol railway division of the Eastern Railway. It is situated at Jardaha, Chandanpahari, Dumka district in the Indian state of Jharkhand.

== History ==
Jasidih Junction to Dumka railway line became operational on 12 July 2011 and Dumka to Ambajora Shikaripara track was set up in June 2014. The track from Rampurhat to Pinargaria became operational on 25 November 2012. The complete single railway route from Dumka to Rampurhat, including Chandanpahari railway station became operational on 4 June 2015.

== Station layout ==
G	Street level	Exit/Entrance & ticket counter
P1	Side platform, No-1 doors will open on the left/right
P1	Track 1	Jasidih ← toward → Dumka

== See also ==
- Dumka
- Indian Railways
- Dumka
- Jasidih Junction
- Jasidih–Dumka–Rampurhat line
- Rampurhat Junction
- List of railway stations in India
- Dumka Airport
