= Punsia railway station =

Railway station in Bihar

Punsia

General information
- Location: State Highway 23, Punsia, Banka district, Bihar; India
- Coordinates: 24.9532°N 87.0038°E
- Elevation: 71 metres (233 ft)
- System: Indian Railways station
- Owner: Indian Railways
- Operator: Eastern Railway zone
- Line: Dumka–Bhagalpur line
- Platforms: 1
- Tracks: 1

Construction
- Structure type: At–grade
- Parking: Available

Other information
- Status: Functioning
- Station code: PNSA
- Zone(s): Eastern Railway zone
- Division(s): Malda
- Fare zone: Indian Railways

History
- Opened: 1907
- Rebuilt: 2012–15

Services
Preceding station	Indian Railways	Following station
Barahat towards ?	Eastern Railway zone Dumka–Bhagalpur line	Pipradih towards ?
Location

Punsia railway station (station code: PNSA), is a railway station on the Dumka–Bhagalpur line of Sahibganj loop under Malda railway division of the Eastern Railway Zone. The station is situated beside State Highway 23 at Punsia in Banka district in the Indian state of Bihar.

== History ==
The metre-gauge railway track from Bhagalpur Junction railway station to Mandar Hill railway station branch was opened in 1907. The branch was converted to broad gauge. A new railway line from Mandar Hill to Hansdiha became operational on 23 December 2012 and Dumka to Barapalasi route was reconstructed in June 2014 and finally the full track became operational in 2015.
