= Hansdiha railway station =

Railway station in Jharkhand

HANSDIHA JUNCTION

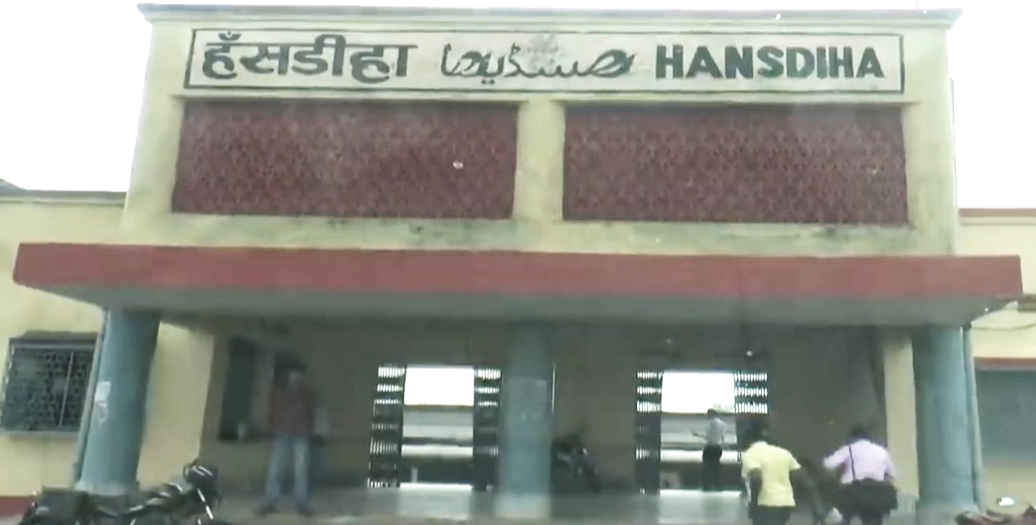
- Hansdiha railway station building

General information
- Location: Hansdiha–Ramgarh Road, Kasba, Hansdiha, Dumka district, Jharkhand; India
- Coordinates: 24.614194°N 87.08498°E
- Elevation: 189 metres (620 ft)
- System: Indian Railways station
- Owner: Indian Railways
- Operator: Eastern Railway zone
- Lines: Dumka–Bhagalpur line Jasidih–Pirpainti line (under construction)
- Platforms: 3
- Tracks: 2

Construction
- Structure type: At–grade
- Parking: Available

Other information
- Status: Functioning
- Station code: HSDA
- Zone(s): Eastern Railway zone
- Division(s): Malda
- Fare zone: Indian Railways

History
- Opened: 2012

Services
Preceding station	Indian Railways	Following station
Kurmahat towards ?	Eastern Railway zone Dumka–Bhagalpur line	Kumradol towards ?
Location
- Location within India Location within Jharkhand
- Interactive map of Hansdiha Junction

Hansdiha Junction railway station is a railway station on the Dumka–Bhagalpur line of Sahibganj loop under Malda railway division of the Eastern Railway Zone. The station is situated beside Hansdiha-Ramgarh Road, Kasba, Hansdiha in Dumka district in the Indian state of Jharkhand.

== History ==
The metre-gauge railway track from Bhagalpur Junction railway station to Mandar Hill railway station branch was opened in 1907. The branch was converted to broad gauge. A new railway line from Mandar Hill to Hansdiha became operational on 23 December 2012 and Dumka to Barapalasi route was reconstructed in June 2014 and finally the full track became operational in 2015.

== Further extension ==
The 97-kilometre (60 mi)-long Jasidih–Hansdiha–Pirpainti line is under construction. As of 2021, work is under progress on Mohanpur–Hansdiha and Godda–Pirpainti sections. The 32-kilometre (20 mi) Hansdiha–Godda section was inaugurated on 8 April 2021 and a Humsafar Express runs weekly from Godda to New Delhi. This line is considered important to connect the Godda district in the Santhal Pargana division of Jharkhand with the rest of India. The 80-kilometre (50 mi) Godda–Pakur line is also planned.

== Trains ==
=== Godda-Hansdiha ===
The Following trains are famously serving this route.

- Godda-Daurai Weekly Express
- Mumbai LTT-Godda SF Express
- Godda-Rajendra Nagar Terminal Weekly Express
- Godda-Delhi Weekly Express
- Godda-Ranchi Express
- Godda Gomti Nagar Weekly Express
- New Delhi-Delhi Humsafar Express
- Godda-Tatanagar Weekly Express
- Ranchi-Godda Intercity Express

While There are also a lot of Passenger and Express trains that serves this section.
