= Jama railway station =

Railway station in Jharkhand

Jama Station
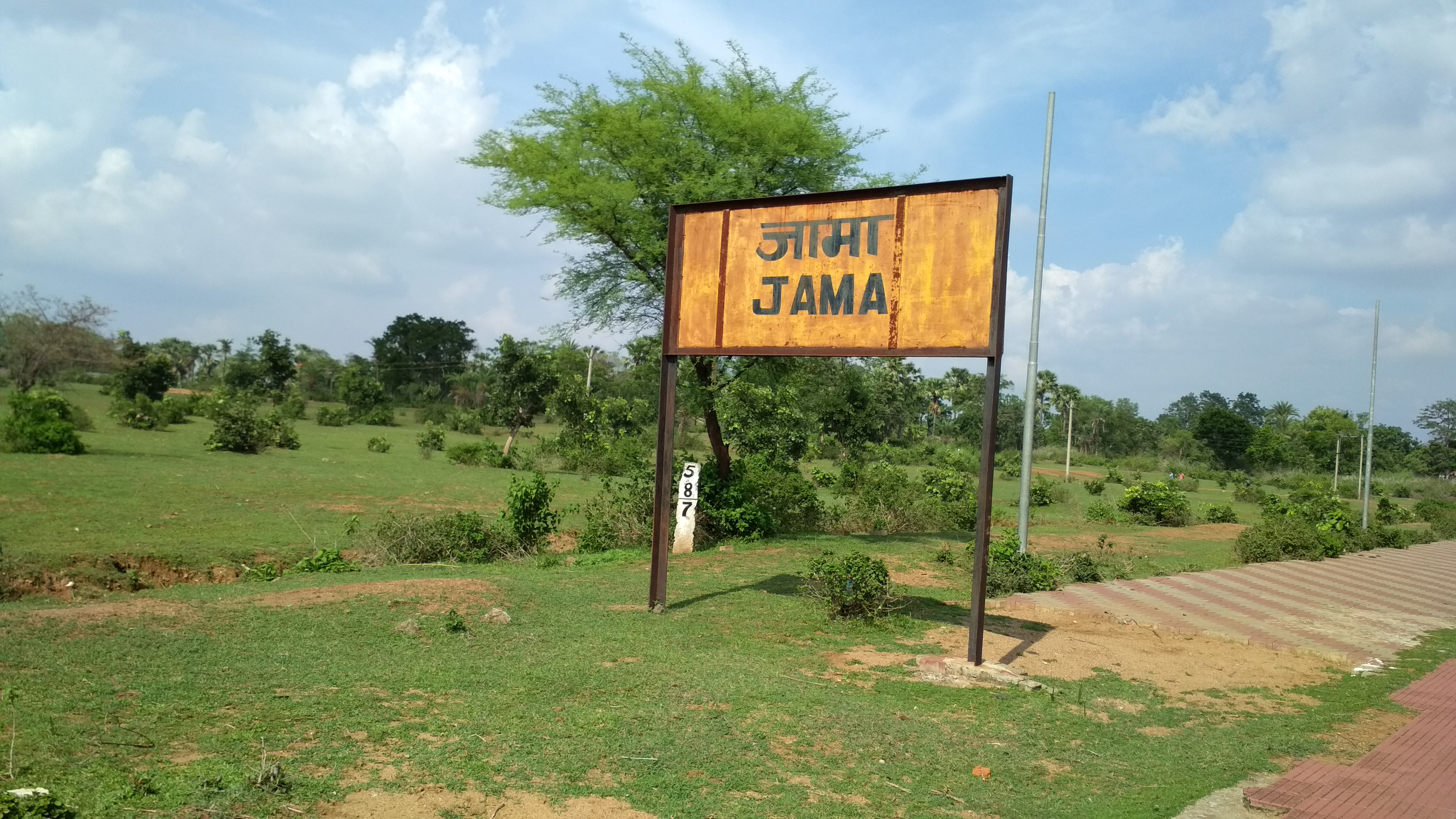
- Jama railway station board

General information
- Location: Jama, Dumka district, Jharkhand 814110; India
- Coordinates: 24.3424981°N 87.15273°E
- Elevation: 169 metres (554 ft)
- System: Indian Railways station
- Owner: Indian Railways
- Operator: Eastern Railway zone
- Line: Jasidih–Dumka–Rampurhat line
- Platforms: Side platform 1
- Tracks: 1
- Connections: Jasidih Junction, Dumka

Construction
- Structure type: At ground, Single-track railway
- Parking: Available

Other information
- Status: Functional
- Station code: Jama
- Zone(s): Eastern Railway
- Division(s): Asansol

History
- Opened: 2011
- Electrified: No.

Services
Preceding station	Indian Railways	Following station
Basukinath towards Rampurhat Junction	Eastern Railway zone Jasidih–Dumka–Rampurhat line	New Madanpur towards Jasidih Junction
Location
- Location within Jharkhand

Jama railway station (station code: JAMA) is at Jama village city in Dumka district in the Indian state of Jharkhand on the Jasidih–Rampurhat section. It is in the Asansol railway division of the Eastern Railway zone of the Indian Railways. It has an average elevation of 169 metres (554 ft).

The railway line has single 5 ft 6 in (1,676 mm) broad gauge track from Jasidih Junction in Deoghar district in Santhal Pargana division of Jharkhand to Rampurhat in Birbhum district of West Bengal. This railway track to Dumka is a boon for Santhal Pargana Division.

The Jama railway station provides rail connectivity to the nearby villages Jarpura, Ghoribad, Silandah, Belkupi, Sugnibad.

== History ==
Jama railway station became operation in 2011. The 72 km (45 mi) segment from Jasidih Junction to Dumka became operational in July 2011.

== Station layout ==
G	Street level	Exit/Entrance & ticket counter
P1	Side platform, No-1 doors will open on the left/right
P1	Track 1	Jasidih ← toward → Dumka

== Trains ==
One express and three passenger trains run between Jasidih Junction and Dumka stop at Jama railway station.

== See also ==
- Dumka
- Indian Railways
- Dumka
- Jasidih Junction
- Jasidih–Dumka–Rampurhat line
- Rampurhat Junction
- List of railway stations in India
- Dumka Airport
