= Basukinath railway station =

Railway station in Jharkhand, India

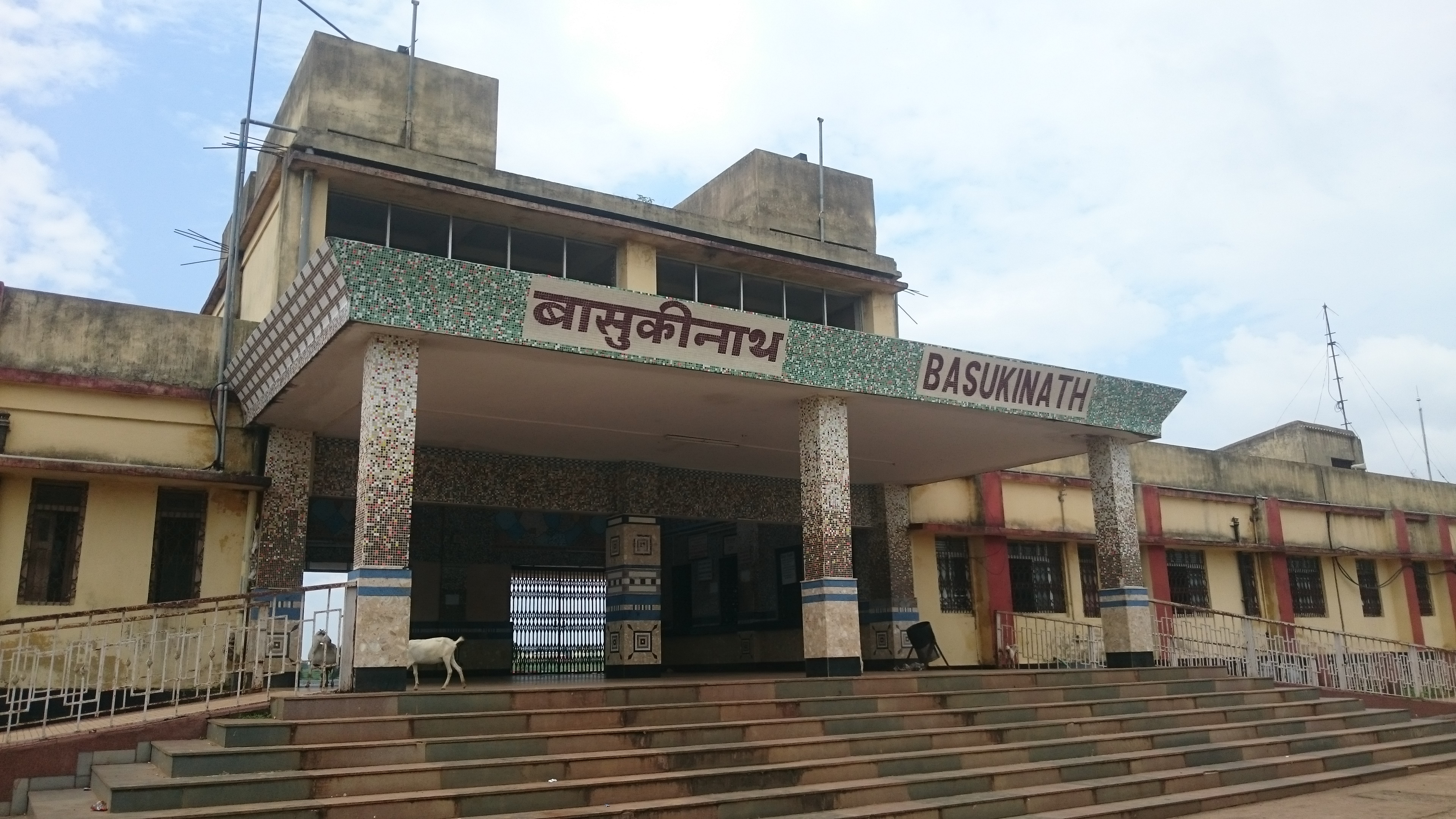
- Basukinath station entrance

General information
- Location: Basukinath, Dumka district, Jharkhand 814118; India
- Coordinates: 24.3843°N 87.0681°E
- Elevation: 207 metres (679 ft)
- System: Indian Railways station
- Owner: Indian Railways
- Operator: Eastern Railway zone
- Line: Jasidih–Dumka–Rampurhat line
- Platforms: Side platform 2
- Tracks: 3
- Connections: Deoghar, Dumka

Construction
- Structure type: At Ground
- Parking: Available

Other information
- Status: Functional
- Station code: BSKH
- Zone(s): Eastern Railway
- Division(s): Asansol Division

History
- Opened: 2011
- Electrified: No.

Services
Preceding station	Indian Railways	Following station
Chandanpahari towards Rampurhat Junction	Eastern Railway zone Jasidih–Dumka–Rampurhat line	Jama towards Jasidih Junction
Location
- Location within Jharkhand

Basukinath railway station (station code: BSKH) is a railway station at Basukinath city in Dumka district in the Indian state of Jharkhand on the Jasidih–Rampurhat section. It is in the Asansol Division of the Eastern Railway zone of the Indian Railways. It has an average elevation of 207 metres (679 ft).

The railway line has single 5 ft 6 in (1,676 mm) broad gauge track from Jasidih junction in Deoghar district in Santhal Pargana division of Jharkhand to Rampurhat in Birbhum district of West Bengal. This railway track to Dumka is a boon for Santhal Pargana Division.

== History ==
Basukinath railway station became operation in 2011. The 72 km (45 mi) segment from Jasidih to Dumka became operational on 12 July 2011. This railway line was sanctioned in 1997–98 Railway Budget but the land acquisition work started after 2002 and major construction started after 2007. First intercity express between Dumka and Ranchi started on 24 September 2012 stops at Basukinath. It run five days a week except Thursday and Sunday.

== Current projects ==
Ongoing new railway line survey between Basukinath and Chitra is taken by the Indian Railways.

== Trains ==
Three passenger trains run between Jasidih junction and Dumka stops at Basukinath. One intercity express train between Dumka and Ranchi also running daily stop at Basukinath.

== Facilities ==
The major facilities available at Basukinath station are waiting rooms, computerised reservation facility, reservation counter and vehicle parking. The station also has toilets, refreshment room, a tea stall and a book stall.

=== Platforms ===
There are a total of 2 platforms and 3 tracks. The platforms are connected by foot overbridge. These platforms are built to accumulate 24 coaches express train.

=== Station layout ===
G	Street level	Exit/Entrance & ticket counter
P1	FOB, Side platform, No-1 doors will open on the left/right
P1	Track 1
P1	Track 2
P1	Track 3
P1	FOB, Island platform, No- 2 doors will open on the left/right

== Nearest Airport ==
The nearest airports are Birsa Munda Airport at Ranchi, Gaya Airport, Lok Nayak Jayaprakash Airport at Patna and Netaji Subhas Chandra Bose International Airport at Kolkata.

== Gallery ==
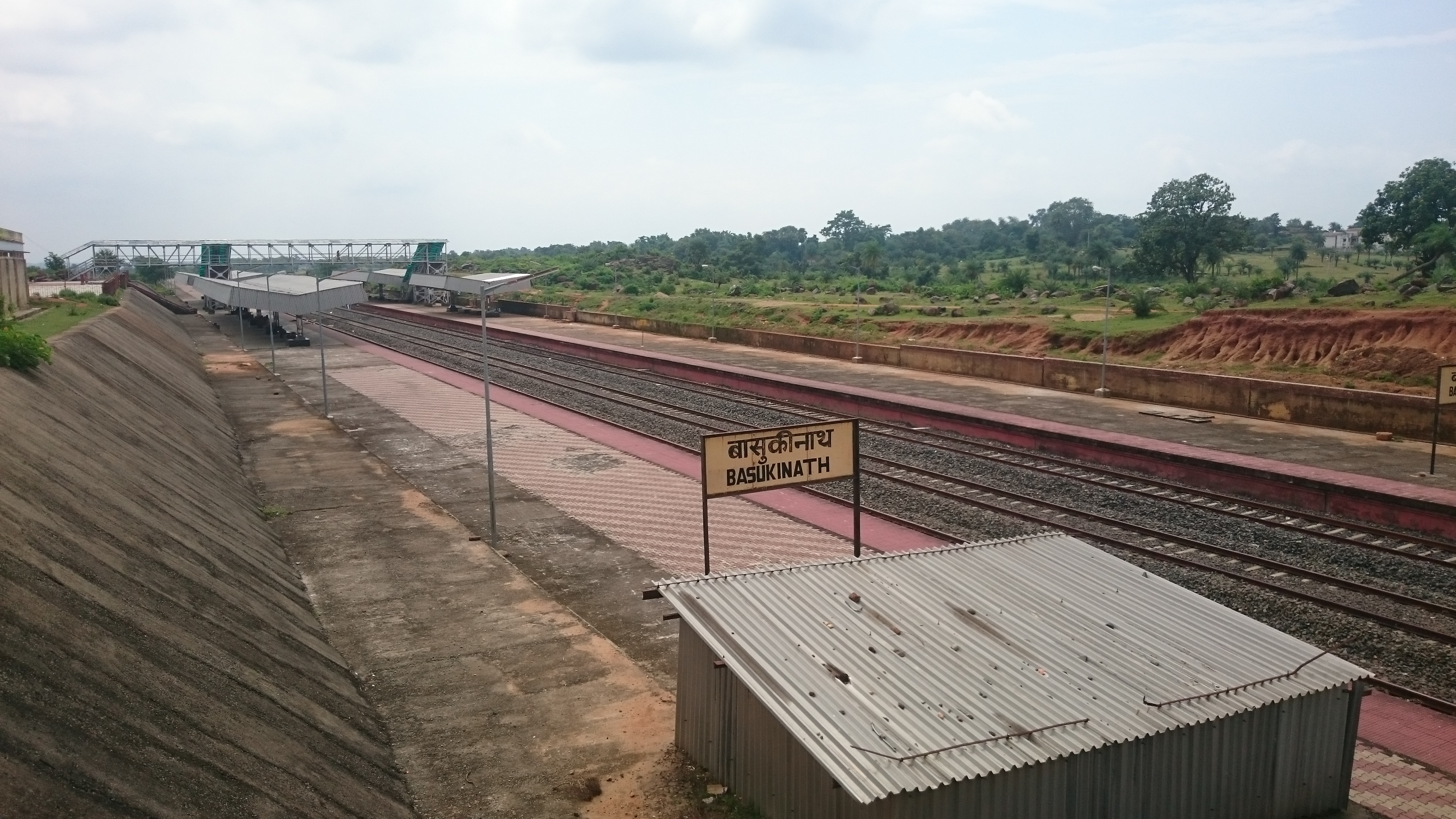
Basukinath railway station platform

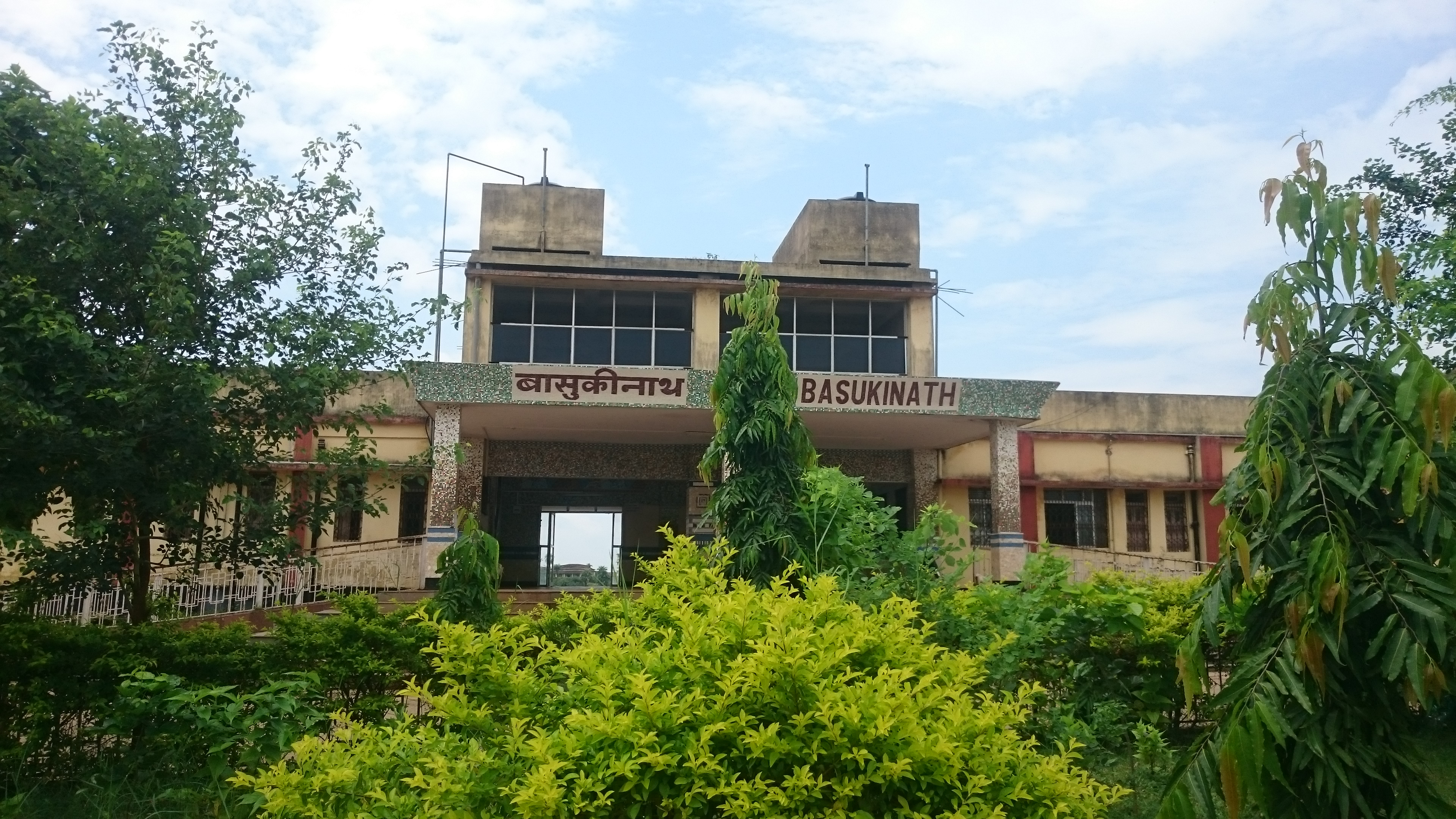
Basukinath railway station

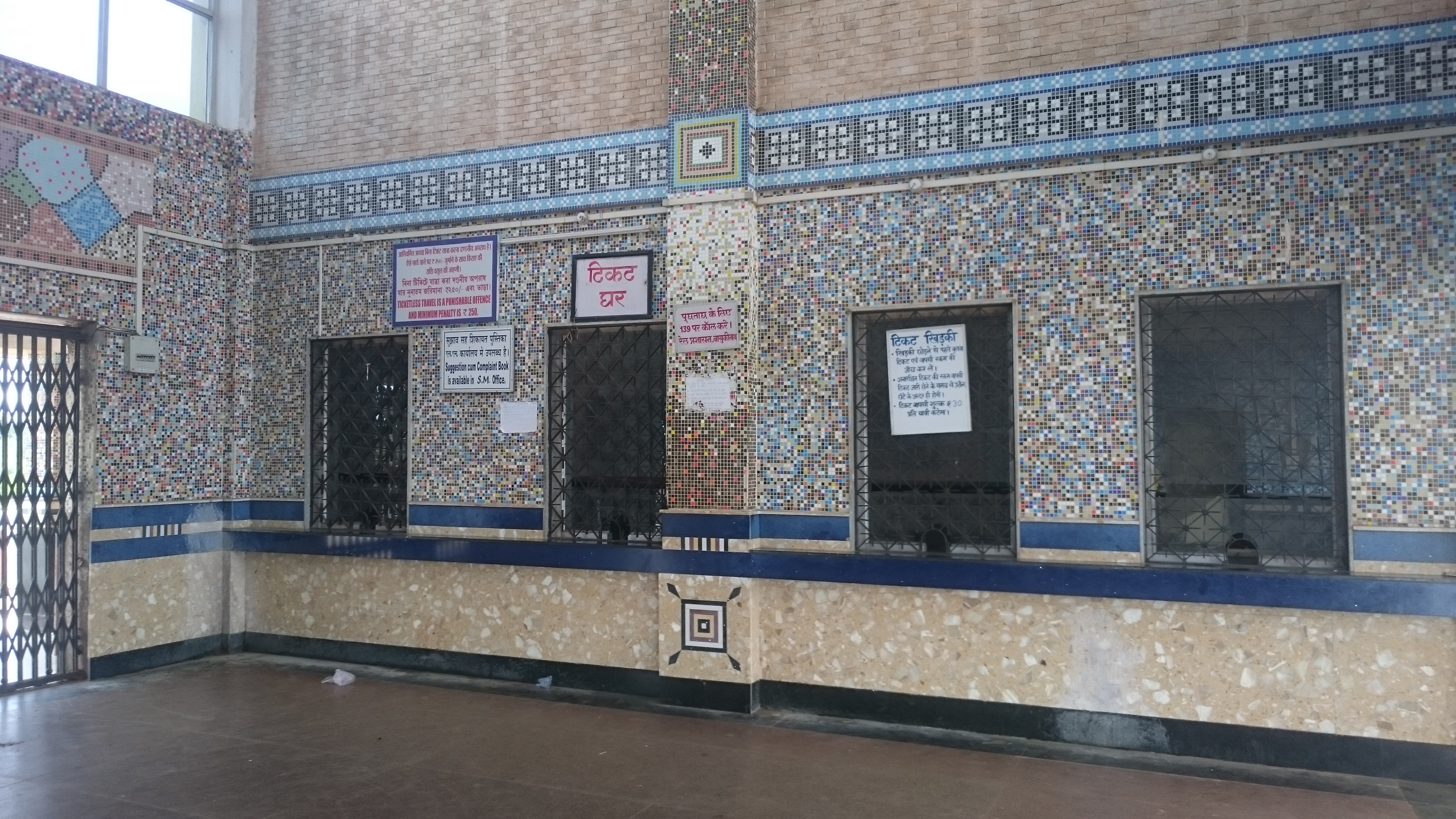
Basukinath railway station ticket counter

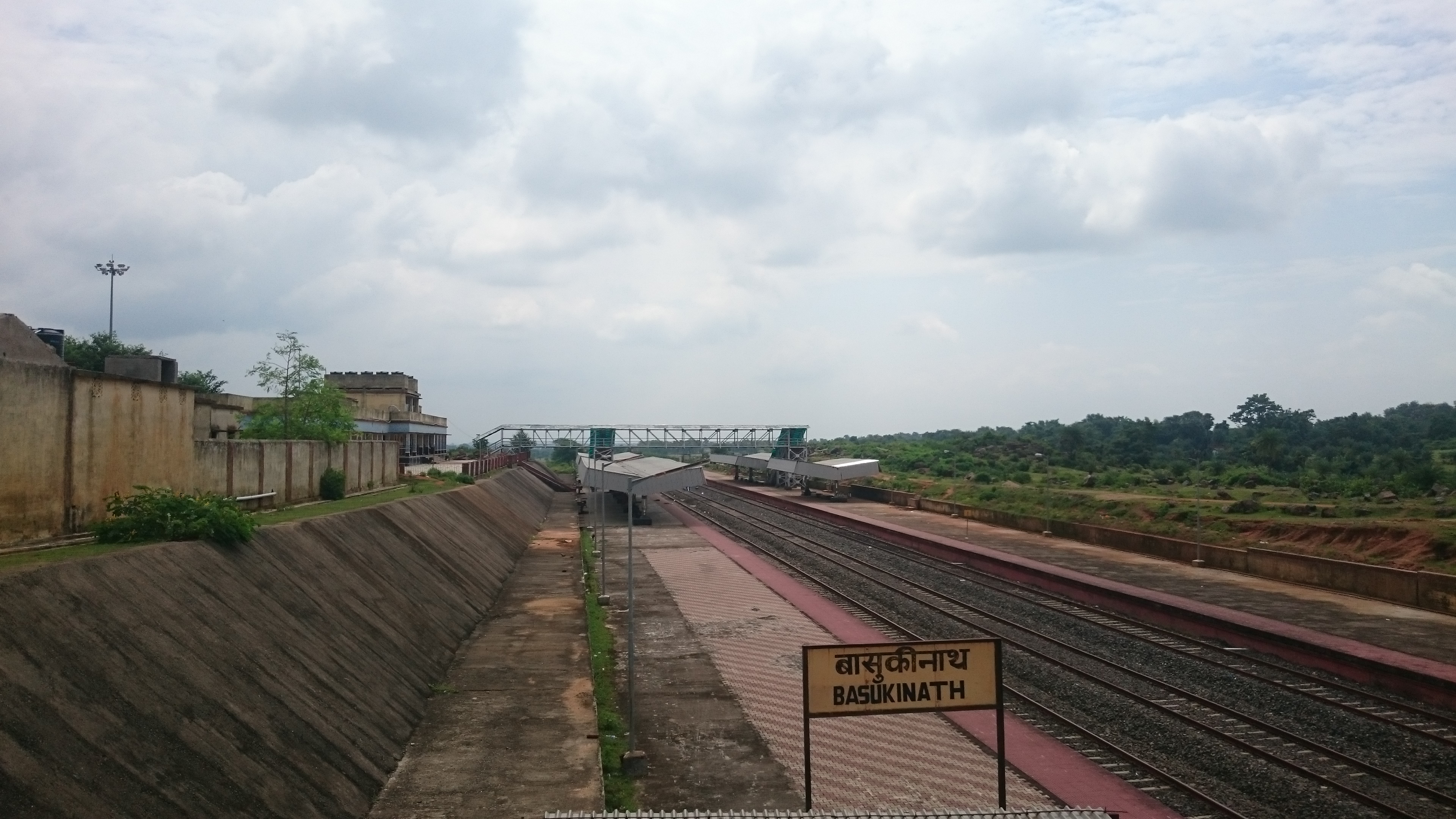
Basukinath railway station platform view

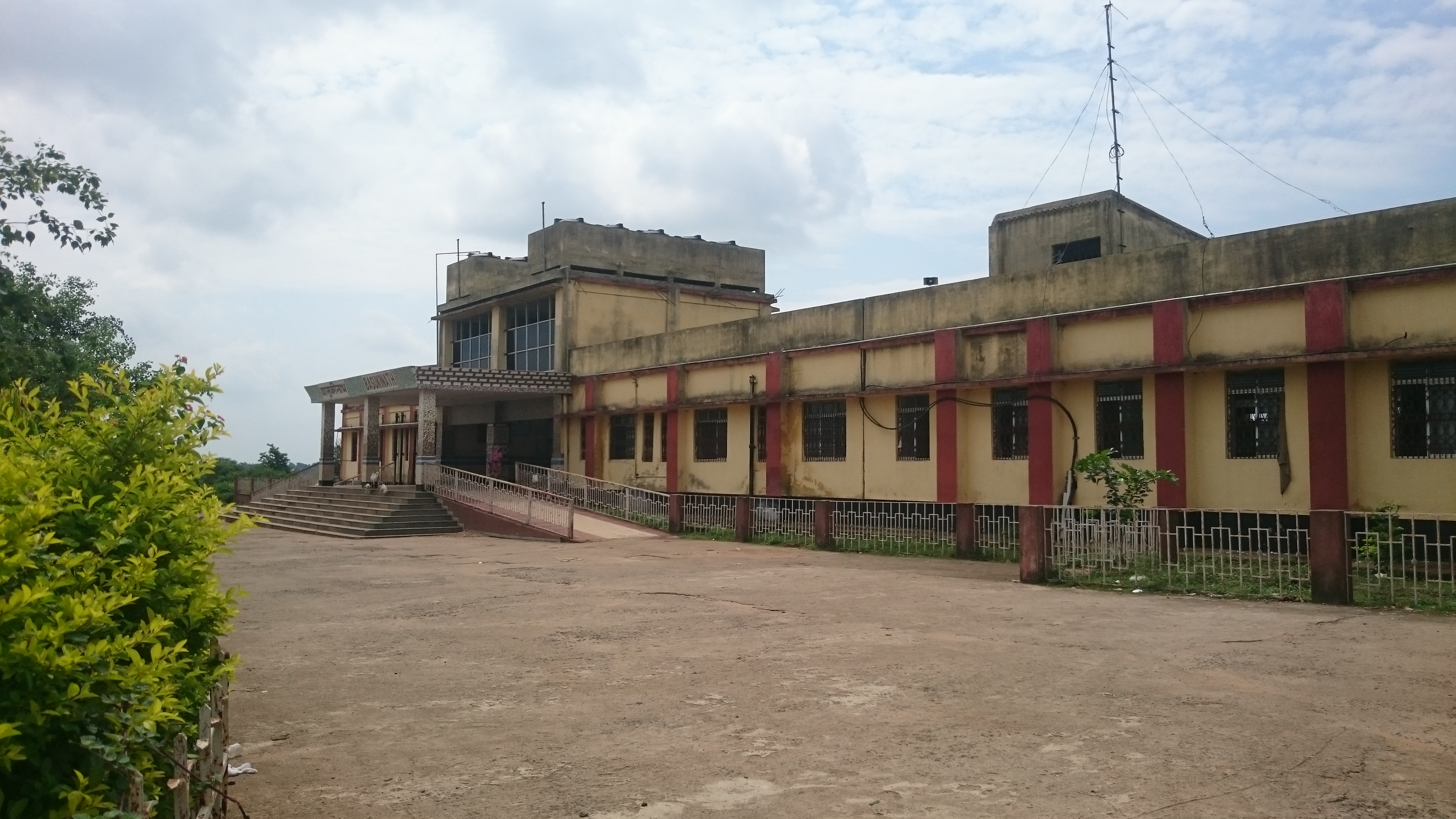
Basukinath railway station building

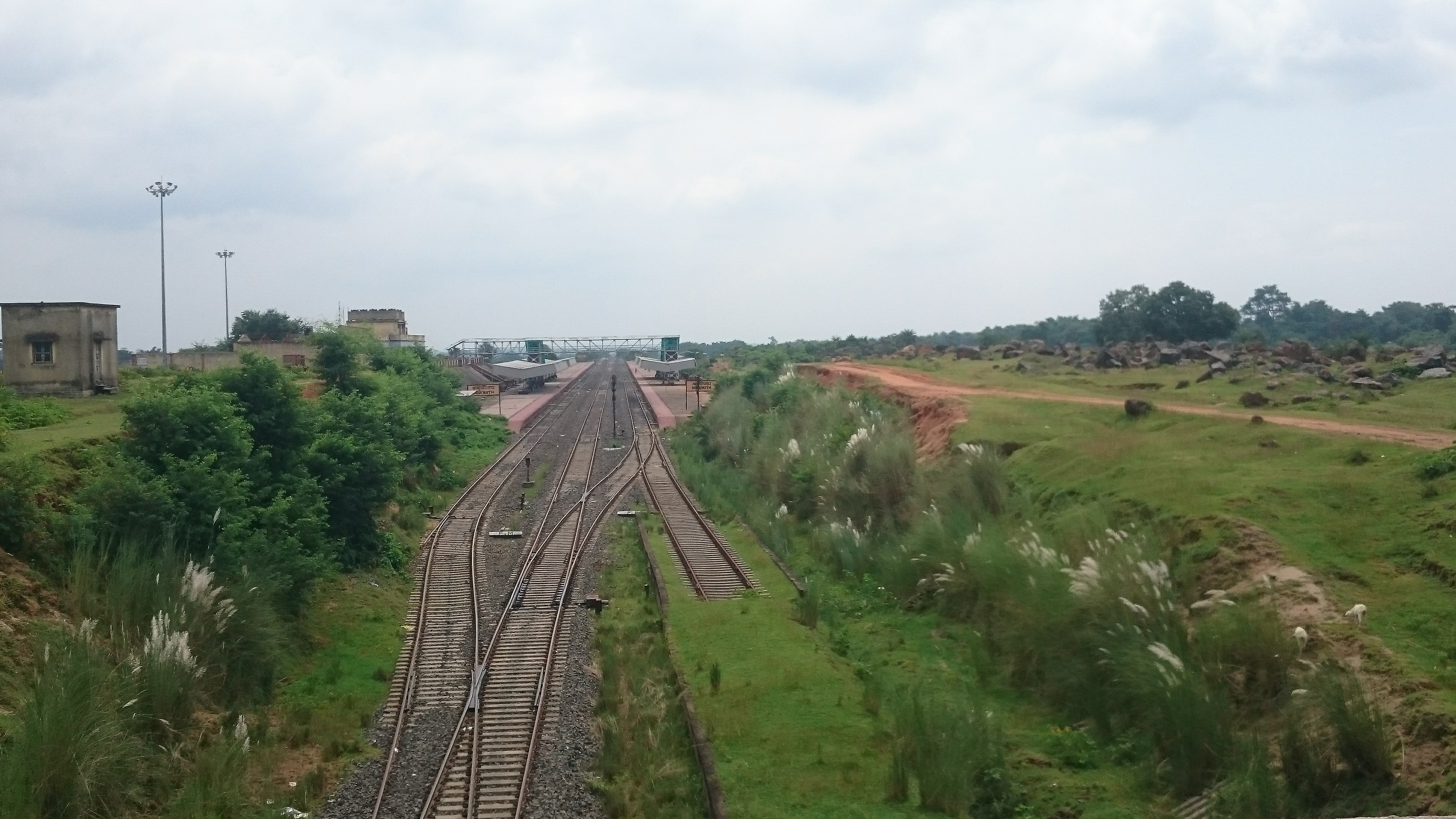
Basukinath railway station distance view

== See also ==
- Dumka
- Indian Railways
- Jasidih Junction railway station
- Jasidih–Dumka–Rampurhat line
- Mandar Hill railway station
- List of railway stations in India
