= Banka Junction railway station =

Railway station in Banka, Bihar, India

Banka railway station

General information
- Location: Station road, Banka; India
- Coordinates: 24.8667°N 86.9128°E
- System: Indian Railways station
- Owner: Indian Railways
- Line: Jasidih–Bhagalpur line
- Platforms: 3
- Tracks: 8

Construction
- Structure type: On ground level
- Parking: Available
- Accessible: Disabled access

Other information
- Status: Operational
- Station code: BAKA
- Zone(s): Eastern Railway zone
- Division(s): Malda

History
- Opened: 2004
- Electrified: 2021
Location
- Location within Bihar

Banka junction railway station is the biggest railway station of Banka district, Bihar (station code BAKA) and serves the city of Banka. It falls under the Malda railway division of the Eastern Railway zone of the Indian Railways. It is connected to Indian cities of Patna, Bhagalpur, Jamalpur, Jasidih and Dumka through daily Passenger and Express trains. As of October 2016, four Passenger trains and one Express train originate and just as many depart from the railway station.

== History ==
This is a railway station on the eastern railway zone of Indian Railways and 1 pair of Express train originates and terminates from the station and some Intercity passengers passes from the station. It was made in 2004 and provides service to daily passengers and goods train as well.
