= New Madanpur railway station =

Railway station in Jharkhand

General information
- Location: Babupur, New Madanpur, Dumka district, Jharkhand; India
- Coordinates: 24.312218°N 87.226329°E
- Elevation: 141 metres (463 ft)
- System: Indian Railways station
- Owner: Indian Railways
- Line: Jasidih–Dumka–Rampurhat line
- Platforms: 2
- Tracks: 1 (Single diesel line)

Construction
- Structure type: Standard (on-ground station)
- Parking: Yes
- Cycle facilities: No

Other information
- Status: Functioning
- Station code: MPUR
- Zone(s): Eastern Railway
- Division(s): Asansol

History
- Opened: 2014–15

Services
Preceding station	Indian Railways	Following station
Dumka towards Rampurhat Junction	Eastern Railway zone Rampurhat–Jasidih line	Jama towards Jasidih Junction
Location

New madanpur railway station is a railway station on the Jasidih–Dumka–Rampurhat line under the Asansol railway division of the Eastern Railway. It is situated at Babupur, New Madanpur, Dumka district in the Indian state of Jharkhand.

== History ==
Jasidih Junction to Dumka railway line became operational on 12 July 2011 and Dumka to Ambajora Shikaripara track was set up in June 2014. The track from Rampurhat to Pinargaria became operational on 25 November 2012. The complete single railway route from Dumka to Rampurhat, including New Madanpur railway station became operational on 4 June 2015.
