= Kumirdaha =

- Village Panchayat
- Location in Jharkhand, India Kumirdaha (India)
- Coordinates: 24°1′52″N 87°25′11″E
- Country: India
- State: Jharkhand
- District: Dumka district
- Elevation: 80 m (260 ft)

Languages
  - Official: Bengali, Hindi
- Time zone: UTC+5:30 (IST)
- PIN: 814148
- Telephone code: 06434
- Vehicle registration: JH XX
- Nearest city: Dumka
- Climate: warm-temperate (Köppen)
- Website: www.facebook.com/pages/Kumirdaha/507961332547476

Kumirdaha is a village in the Ranishwar block in Dumka district of Jharkhand, India. The village has an old temple dedicated to hindu Goddess Durga. Dumka-Suri main road connects Jharkhand and West Bengal. A place named 'Border' is located at the extremity of the block.

== Geography ==
Kumirdaha is located at 24° 1' 60N 87° 25' 0E. It has an average elevation of 80 metres (260 ft). Kumirdaha is 40 km from its District Main City Dumka. It is 228 km from its State Main City Ranchi. Nearby villages are Mahishbathan, Sadipur, Patjor, Rangalia. Giripur, Rangamatia, Saltola, Sukhjora, Taldangal, Banskuli, Bilkandi, Dakshinjol, etc.

Kumirdaha has predominantly undulating terrain with hard rocks in the underground. The area has an undulating terrain with low hills and ridges. The fertility of soil is poor due to extensive erosion, acidic character and low retaining capacity. On the south of Kumirdaha lies the famous Mayurakshi river, To the west lies the Massanjore area; the Rajmahal Hills are a separate hill range in Jharkhand.

=== Climate ===
Kumirdaha has a warm-temperate climate, with hot, humid summers and mild, dry winters.

Climate data for Dumka
| Month | Jan | Feb | Mar | Apr | May | Jun | Jul | Aug | Sep | Oct | Nov | Dec | Year |
|---|---|---|---|---|---|---|---|---|---|---|---|---|---|
| Mean daily maximum °C (°F) | 18.1 (64.6) | 21.0 (69.8) | 25.9 (78.6) | 30.3 (86.5) | 30.7 (87.3) | 30.1 (86.2) | 28.4 (83.1) | 28.1 (82.6) | 28.2 (82.8) | 27.0 (80.6) | 23.3 (73.9) | 19.0 (66.2) | 25.8 (78.4) |
| Mean daily minimum °C (°F) | 10.2 (50.4) | 13.2 (55.8) | 17.4 (63.3) | 22.3 (72.1) | 23.9 (75.0) | 24.7 (76.5) | 24.1 (75.4) | 23.7 (74.7) | 23.6 (74.5) | 21.0 (69.8) | 16.0 (60.8) | 11.1 (52.0) | 19.3 (66.7) |
| Average precipitation mm (inches) | 9.0 (0.35) | 15.0 (0.59) | 21.0 (0.83) | 35.0 (1.38) | 72.0 (2.83) | 198.0 (7.80) | 343.0 (13.50) | 293.0 (11.54) | 273.0 (10.75) | 116.0 (4.57) | 9.0 (0.35) | 7.0 (0.28) | 116.0 (4.57) |
| Average relative humidity (%) | 60 | 53 | 47 | 50 | 60 | 73 | 83 | 83 | 81 | 74 | 65 | 62 | 66 |
Source: Weatherbase

== Demography and culture ==
The population in the village is predominantly Bengali speaking due to its close proximity with West Bengal. There is a good number of Muslim population also. As of 2011 India census, Kumirdaha had a population of 89336. Males constitute 53% of the population and females 47%. Kumirdaha has an average literacy rate of 47.54, lower than the national average of 74.4%: male literacy is 59.54% and, female literacy is 35.12%. In Dumka, 17% of the population is under 6 years of age.

== Economy ==
Most of the villagers belong to the lower and middle-class background. They depend on farming on their own land and others land. Only a few of the residents work in the service sector. Popular business of the region is shop owner. Kumirdaha is filled with shops of various kinds such as clothes, hardware, cement, and sweets. Kumirdaha has a Nationalized Bank.

== Transport ==
Kumirdaha is connected with road to the neighboring city. Since July 2011 Dumka is connected with newly built Jasidih - Dumka railway line. Since then Kumirdaha got a new connectivity to the Howrah-New Delhi line, via Dumka-Jasidih. Although there is an ongoing work on new railway line, which will connect Dumka to Bhagalpur (Bihar) and Rampurhat (west Bangal) in coming years.

Buses are the preferred mode of transport and are run by both government agencies and private operators. Dumka has good connectivity to it neighboring district with buses. There is a luxury night bus service between Dumka - Ranchi and Kolkata. The following are railway stations close to Ranishwar:

1. Siuri Railway Station, located at a distance of 21 kilometres (13 mi)
2. Chinpal Railway Station, located at a distance of 26 kilometres (16 mi)
3. Gadadharpur Railway Station, located at a distance of 28 kilometres (17 mi)
4. Sainthia Railway Station, located at a distance of 29 kilometres (18 mi)
5. Dumka Railway Station, located at a distance of 40 kilometres (25 mi)

== Education ==
Mayurakshi Gramin College located at Ranishwar provides higher education to the students. Ranishwar has some CBSE schools, and government schools following NCERT syllabus. Schools in and around Ranishwar include:

1. Govt. High School Kumirdaha follows NCERT syllabus
2. Ranigram Middle School established in the year 1901, is one of the oldest school in Dumka district.
3. Raghunathpur Govt. High School
4. UPG Middle School Rangalia
5. Sadipur Govt. Middle School
6. Govt. Middle School Dhanbasa follows NCERT syllabus
7. Sido Kanhu High school Affiliated to CBSE board, New Delhi

== Tourist places ==
Masanjore Dam is a picnic spot situated in Dumka District of Jharkhand. This small village is about 31 km south of Dumka. The Masanjore Dam on the Mayurakshi River is a major draw. From the counterpart rupee fund created through supplies of wheat and other materials from Canada for use in India, Canada Govt. devoted those funds to further development of the Mayurakshi project And Masanjore dam was commissioned in 1955. That's why the Dam still mentioned as Canada Dam. The dam is bounded by hills and forests. Mayurakshi Bhawan Bungalow and Inspection Bungalow offer accommodation in the village. By road, Masanjore is connected with Vakreshwara (59 km), Sainthia (50 km), Tarapith (70 km), Rampurhat (62 km) and Deoghar (98 km). Masanjor dam or the Pearson dam on river Mayurakshi is at the foothills of long range of forest clad parallel hill ranges. This place is basically a hydro electric power generating center but in the process of time it has become a center for the tourist. There is a garden on the down hill and two dak-bungalows on the bank of the river.
