= Sultanganj railway station =

Railway station in Bhagalpur, Bihar, India

Ajgaibinath Dham
- Ajgabinath Dham

General information
- Location: NH 33 Sultanganj, Bhagalpur district, Bihar; India
- Coordinates: 25.2416°N 86.7353°E
- System: Light rail & Commuter rail station
- Owner: Indian Railways
- Operator: Eastern Railway zone
- Line: Sahibganj loop
- Platforms: 3
- Tracks: 5

Construction
- Structure type: At grade
- Parking: Available
- Accessible: Disabled access

Other information
- Status: Functioning
- Station code: SGG
- Zone(s): Eastern Railway
- Fare zone: Indian Railways
Location
- Location within India Location within Bihar

Ajgaibinath Dham railway station, formerly called Sultanganj railway station, (station code: SGG), is a railway station in the Bhagalpur district. Ajgaibinath Dham railway station comes under the Malda railway division of the Eastern Railway Zone, Indian Railways.
