= Dumka railway station =

Railway station in Jharkhand, India

DUMKA

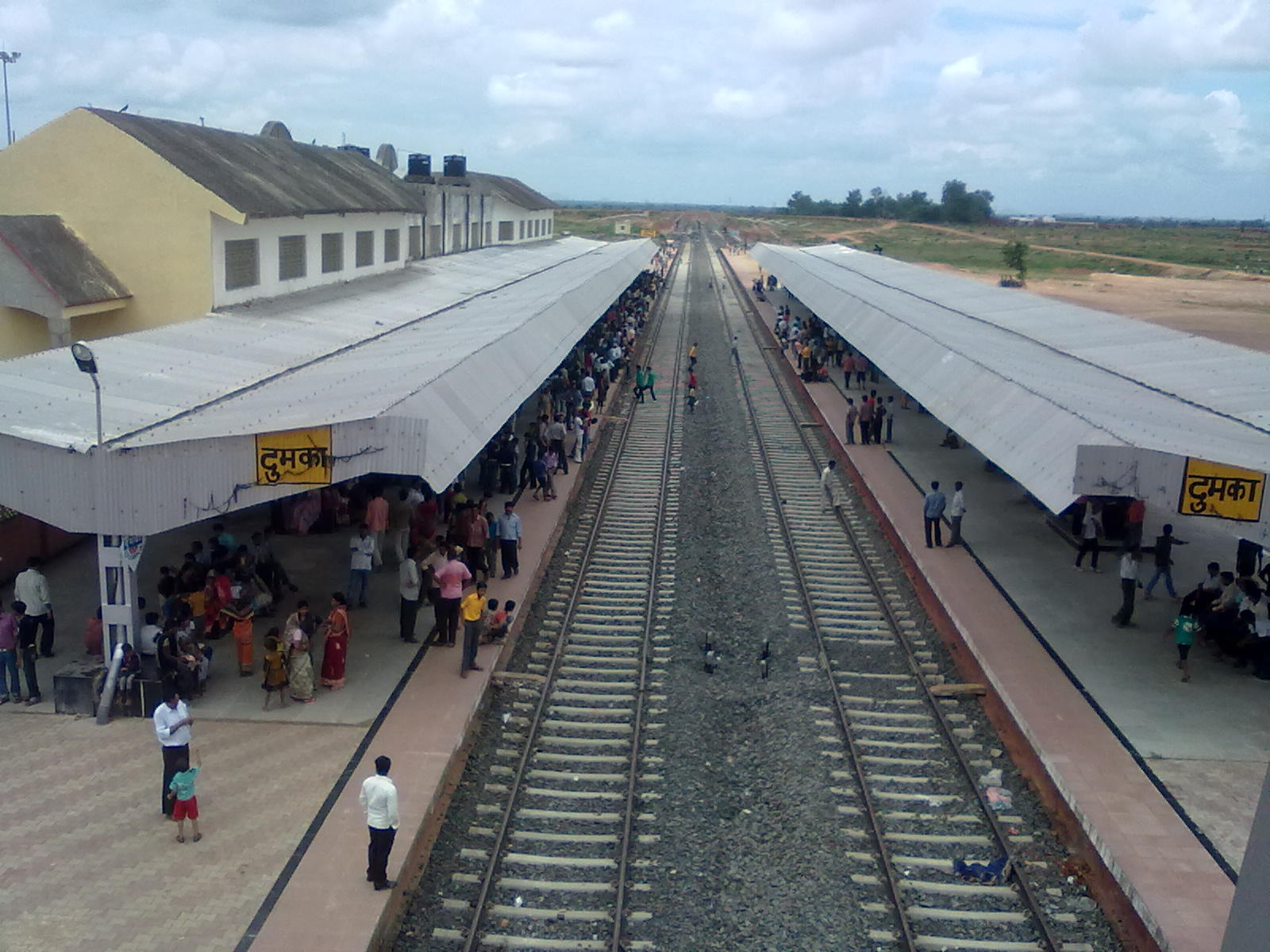
- Dumka station seen from foot overbridge

General information
- Location: Rashikpur Road, Dumka, Dumka district, Jharkhand; India
- Coordinates: 24°17′22″N 87°15′18″E
- Elevation: 136 metres (446 ft)
- System: Indian Railways station
- Owner: Indian Railways
- Operator: Eastern Railway zone
- Lines: Jasidih–Dumka–Rampurhat line, Dumka–Bhagalpur line
- Platforms: 3
- Tracks: 7
- Connections: Jasidih, Rampurhat, Bhagalpur, Godda

Construction
- Structure type: At ground
- Parking: Available (paid)

Other information
- Status: Functional
- Station code: DUMK
- Zone(s): Eastern Railway
- Division(s): Asansol Division

History
- Opened: 2011
- Electrified: 2021

Services
Preceding station	Indian Railways	Following station
New Madanpur towards Rampurhat Junction	Eastern Railway zone Jasidih–Dumka–Rampurhat line	Kurwa towards Jasidih Junction
Location
- Location within India Location within Jharkhand
- Interactive map of Dumka

Dumka railway station (station code DUMK) is a railway station serving the city of Dumka in Dumka district in the Indian state of Jharkhand on the Jasidih–Rampurhat section. It is in the Asansol division of the Eastern Railway zone of the Indian Railways. It has an average elevation of 136 metres (446 ft).

The railway station has a single 5 ft 6 in (1,676 mm) broad gauge track from Jasidih Junction in Deoghar district in Santhal Pargana division of Jharkhand to Rampurhat Junction in Birbhum district of West Bengal and a single track to Bhagalpur via Mandar Hill and Hansdiha.

== History ==
Trains started from Dumka railway station when the 72 km track from Jasidih to Dumka became operational on 12 July 2011. The railway line was sanctioned in 1997–98 Railway Budget but the land acquisition work started after 2002 and major construction started after 2007. The first freight train came to Dumka on 12 December 2010. First intercity express between Dumka and Ranchi started on 24 September 2012. It runs every day.

Construction of the track from Dumka to Rampurhat was completed in early 2015 and became operational on 4 June 2015 when a passenger train operated from Dumka to Rampurhat. New train connections between West Bengal and Bihar via Dumka became feasible.

The 130 km railway line via Dumka reduced the distance between Jasidih and Rampurhat by 140 km from 270 km via Asansol.

A new railway line to connect Dumka to Bhagalpur directly was constructed. First, the metre-gauge railway track from Bhagalpur to Mandar Hill was converted to broad gauge. Then a new railway line from Mandar Hill to Hansdiha became operational on 23 December 2012. The further 30 km extension to Dumka became operational in 2015.

== Facilities ==
The major facilities available at Dumka station are waiting rooms, computerised reservation facility, drinking water, reservation counter and vehicle parking. The station also has toilets, refreshment room, a tea stall and a book stall.

=== Platforms ===
There are 3 platforms and 5 tracks. The platforms are connected by foot overbridge. These platforms are built to accumulate 24 coaches express trains. The platforms are equipped with modern facility like display board of arrival and departure of trains.

Dumka railway station has a separate platform for receiving and unloading freight (goods) trains.

=== Station layout ===
G	Street level	Exit/Entrance & ticket counter
P1	FOB, Side platform, No-1 doors will open on the left/right
P1	Track 1	Rampurhat ← toward → Jasidih
P1	Track 2	toward → Ranchi
P1	FOB, Island platform, No- 2 doors will open on the left/right
P1	Island platform, No- 3 doors will open on the left/right
P1	Track 3	toward → Bhagalpur
Track 4	For freight trains
Track 5	For freight trains

== Trains ==
Passenger train services exist from Dumka to Jasidih, Rampurhat, Bhagalpur and Godda Patna. One intercity express train runs daily between Dumka and Ranchi. An express train Kaviguru Express runs between Howrah and Jamalpur via Dumka; its first run was on 10 November 2018. And One New Patna express train runs daily between Dumka via Jamalpur. Patna Express its first run was on 24 January 2024.

== Nearest airport ==
The nearest airports are Deoghar Airport at Deoghar and Kazi Nazrul Islam Airport at Durgapur

== Gallery ==
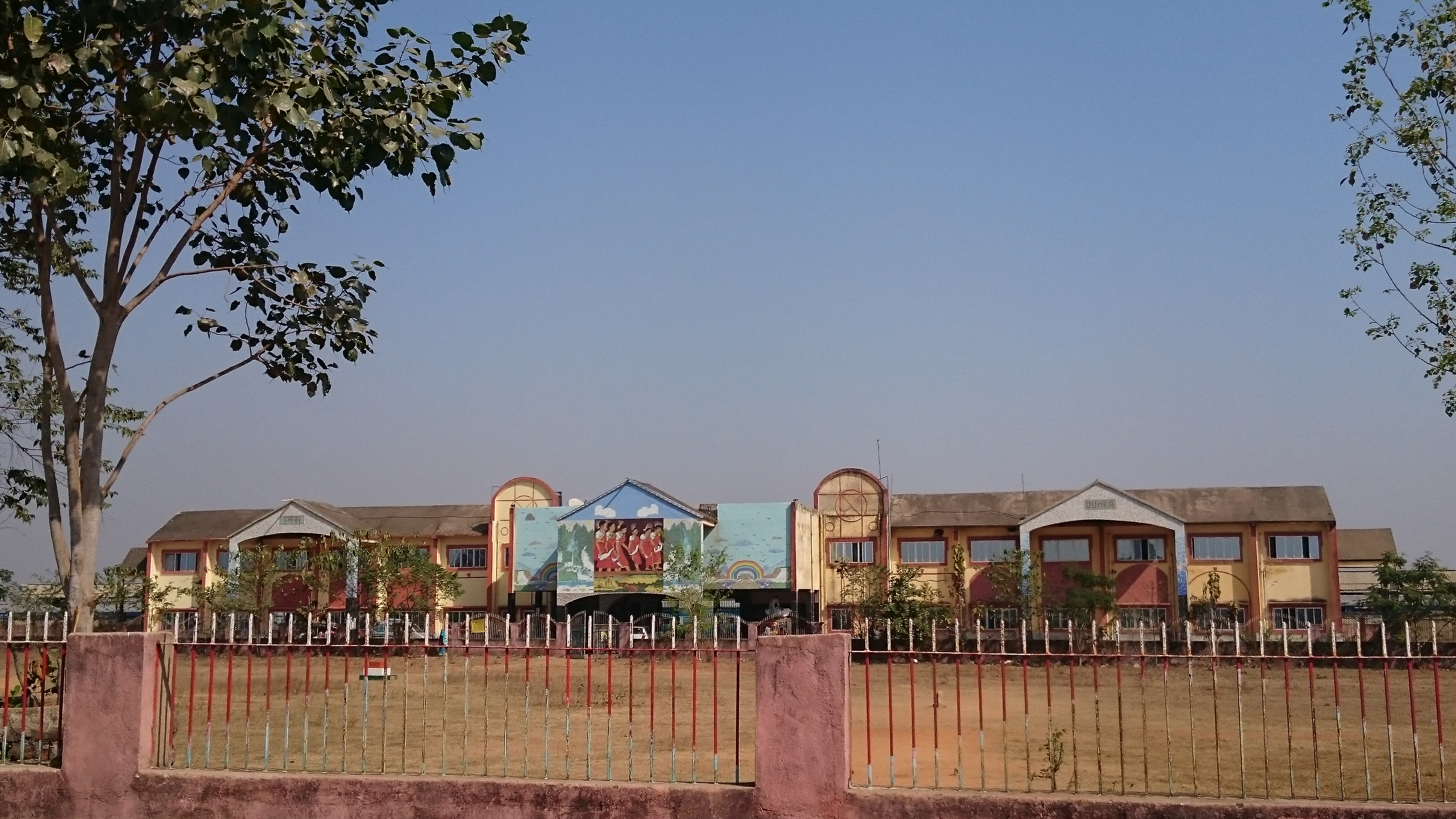
Front station view

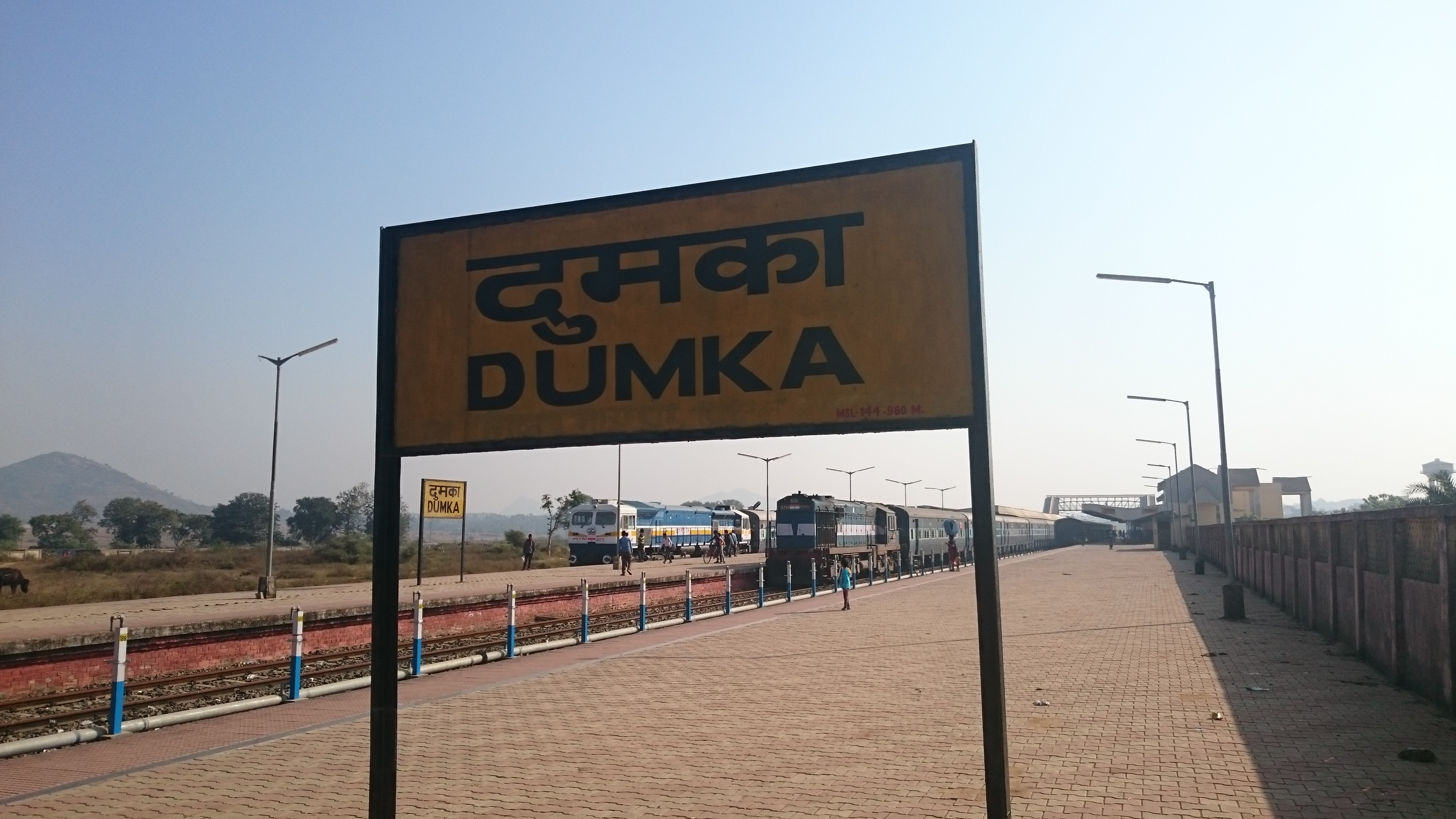
Station board

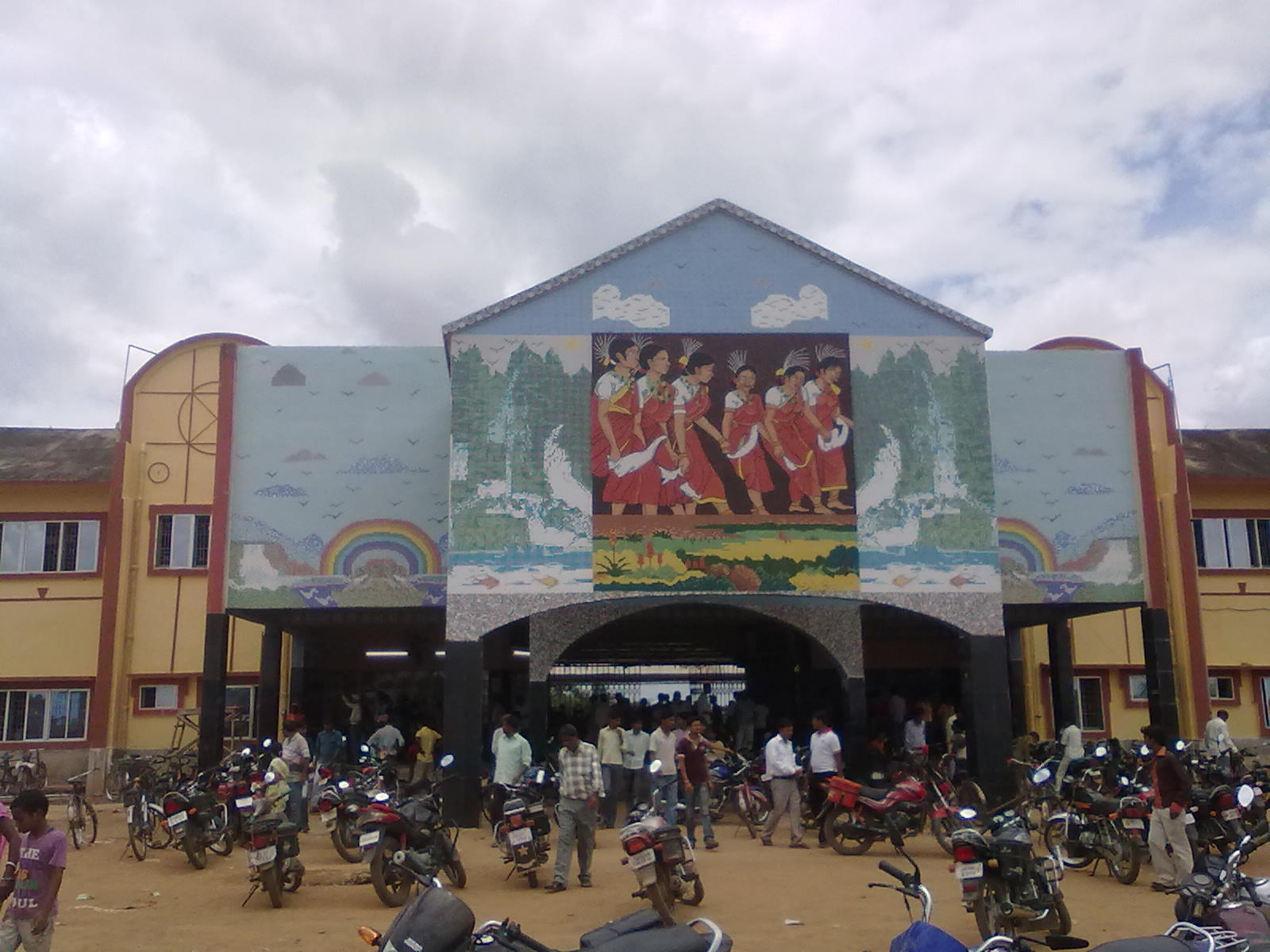
Dumka railway station

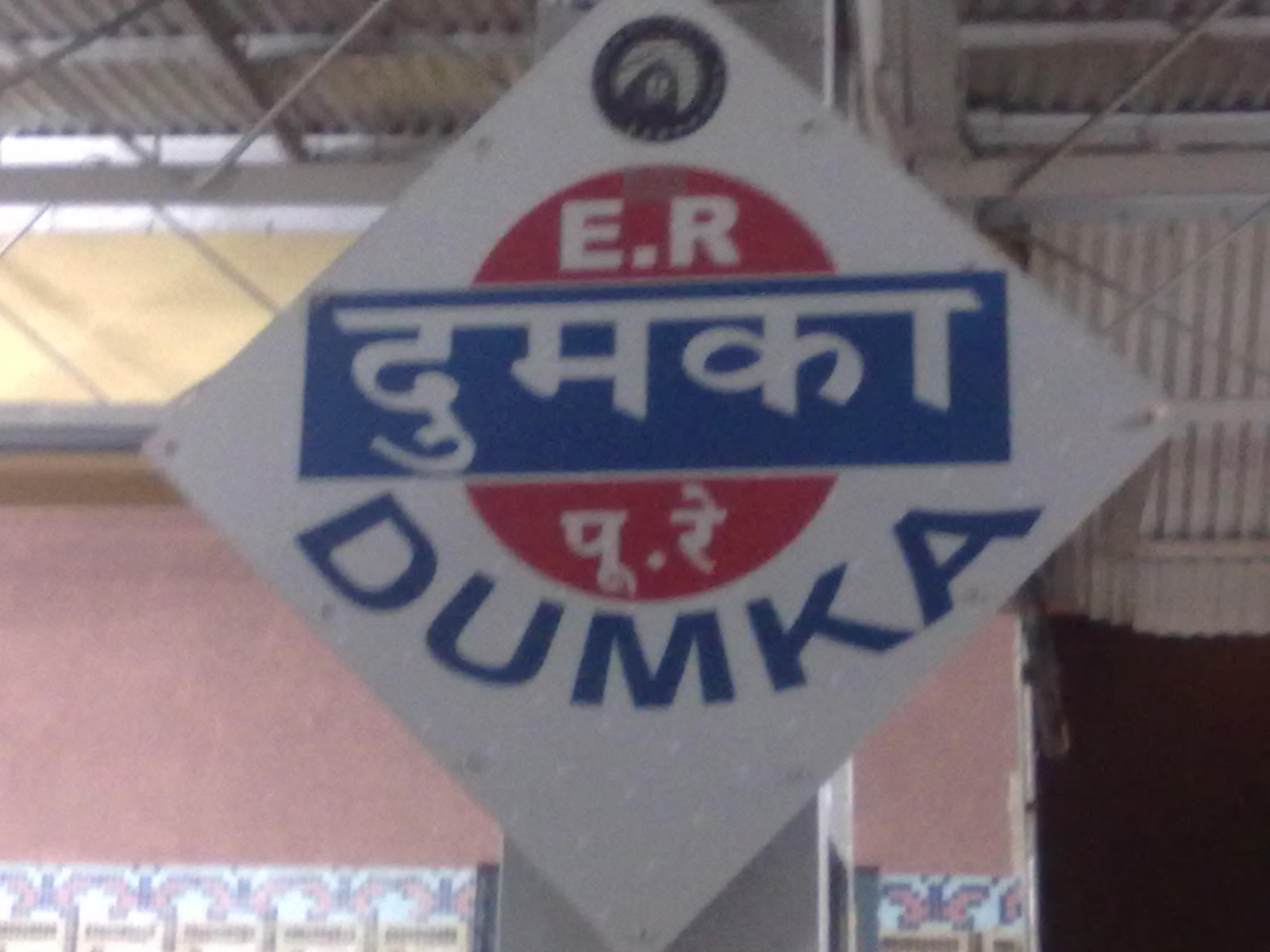
Dumka railway station signboard

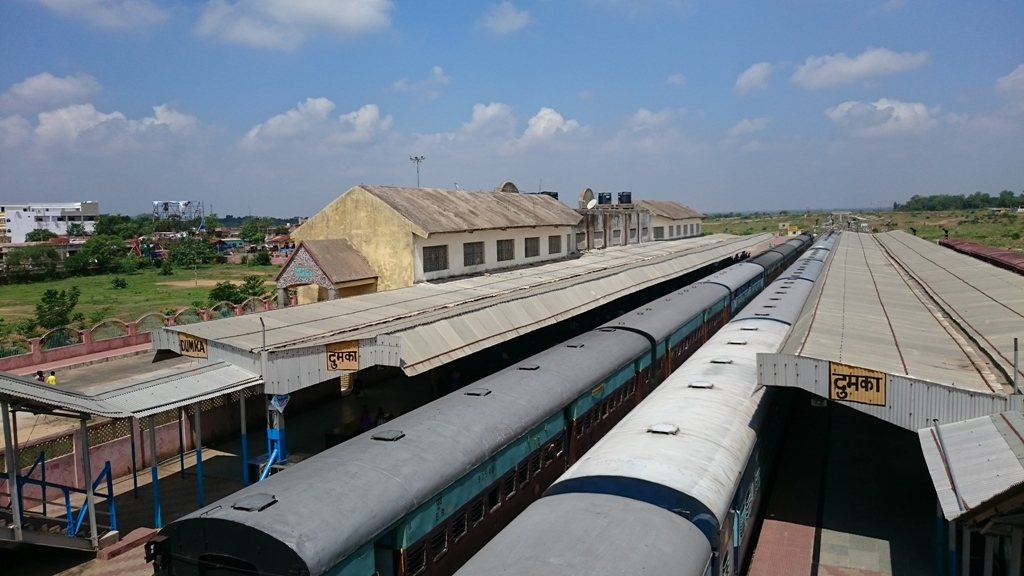
Dumka railway station view

== See also ==
- Dumka
- Indian Railways
- Jasidih Junction railway station
- Rampurhat Junction Railway Station
- Jasidih–Dumka–Rampurhat line
- Mandar Hill railway station
- List of railway stations in India
