= Jasidih–Dumka–Rampurhat line =

Railway line in India

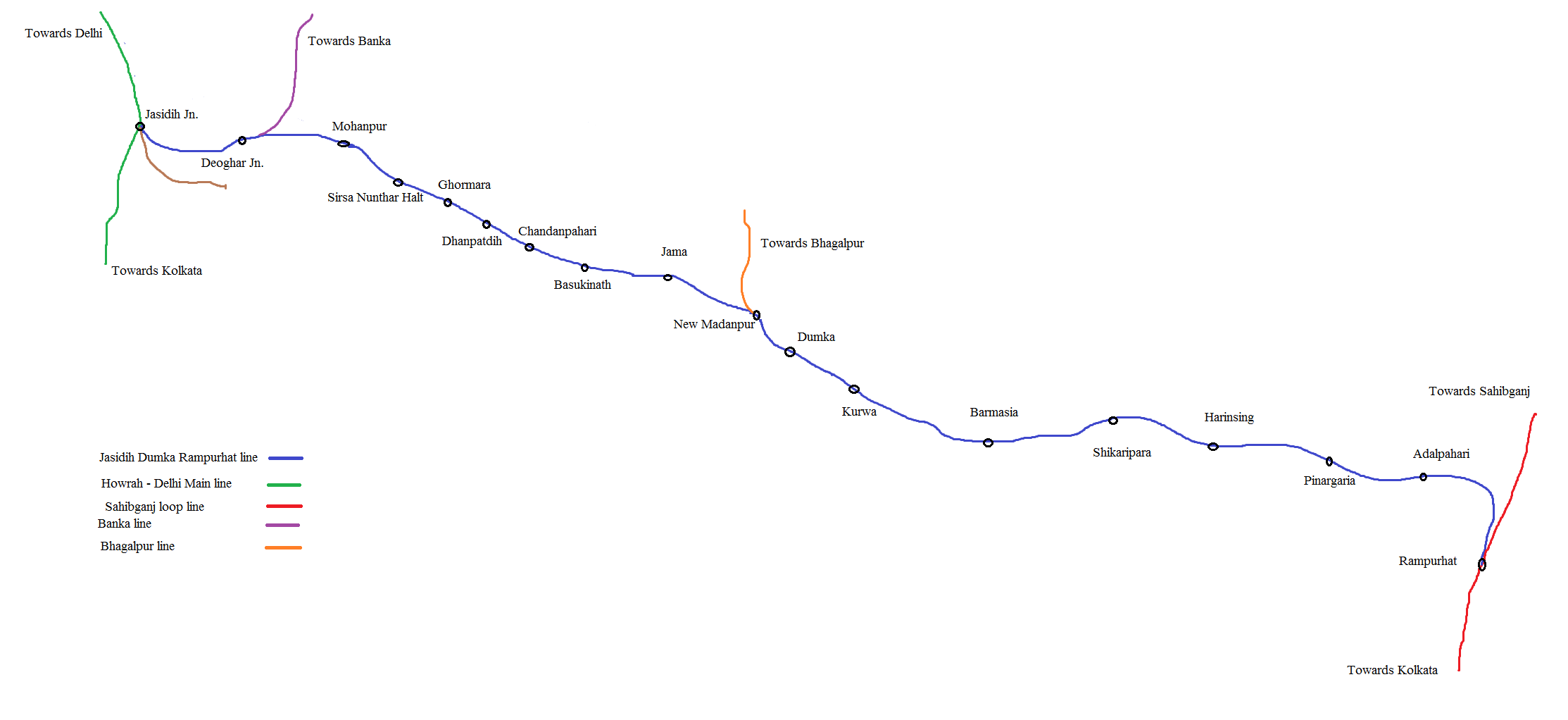
- Jasidih Dumka Rampurhat line Map of Jasidih–Dumka–Rampurhat line

Overview
- Status: Operational
- Owner: Indian Railways
- Locale: Jharkhand, West Bengal, India
- Termini: Jasidih Junction; Rampurhat Junction
- Stations: 16

Service
- Type: Single Electric Line
- Services: via Dumka
- Operator(s): Eastern Railway zone

History
- Opened: 2011; 15 years ago

Technical
- Line length: 135 km (84 mi)
- Number of tracks: 1
- Track gauge: 1,676 mm (5 ft 6 in)
- Electrification: Yes
- Operating speed: 110 km/h (70 mph)

Jasidih–Dumka–Rampurhat line is a single 5 ft 6 in (1,676 mm) broad gauge track from Jasidih in Deoghar District in Santhal Pargana division of Jharkhand state to Rampurhat in Birbhum District of West Bengal state. The line connects the cultural capital of Jharkhand Deoghar to the subcapital of Jharkhand, Dumka. The Jasidih–Dumka section falls under Asansol Division of Eastern Railway and Dumka–Rampurhat section under Howrah Division of Eastern Railway.

== History ==
The railway line to connect Santhal Pargana with Bengal was conceived by the British in 1850s to exploit the natural resources but was not implemented due to Santhal rebellion of 1855. Demands were raised for a railway line many times after independence. Prime Minister Atal Bihari Vajpayee approved the railway line and laid the foundation stone in 1999.

Deoghar is an important railway station on the Jasidih–Dumka–Rampurhat railway line. Due to the importance of Deoghar as a religious place, a railway line from Jasidih to Baidyanathdham Deoghar has been in existence for a long time. The old Deoghar railway station Baidyanathdham Deoghar railway station, however, was located inside the town, so the railway line could not be extended through densely inhabited areas. Therefore, a new railway line was built from Jasidih and a new Deoghar Junction railway station north of Deoghar was built.

Rampurhat Junction is 7th busiest railway stations of Eastern Railway zone and it is the largest and busiest railway station of Birbhum district of West Bengal.It is the main gateway for the Religion Pilgrims visiting to Tarapith Maa Tara Temple.

This route directly connects 2 popular tourist & pilgrims destination Deoghar (Baba Baidyanathdham) with Rampurhat (Tarapith Maa Tara).

The 71 km segment from Jasidih Junction to Dumka via Deoghar became operational on 12 July 2011. The track from Dumka to Ambajora Sikaripara became operational in June 2014. The track from Rampurhat to Pinargaria became operational on 25 November 2012. The short distance of 10 km from Ambajora Sikaripara to Pinargaria was completed at the beginning of 2015 and became operational on 4 June 2015 when a passenger train started operating from Dumka to Rampurhat.

The line reduces the distance between Jasidih Junction and Rampurhat by 135 km, from 270 km via Asansol Junction.

== Branch Lines ==
=== Dumka–Bhagalpur line ===
Construction of a new Dumka–Bhagalpur railway line was taken up as an associated project to connect Dumka with Bhagalpur. The new railway line takes off from Dumka railway station towards the north and connects with Bhagalpur Junction railway station. The 51 km railway line from Bhagalpur to Banka and Mandar Hill already existed. The railway line extended from Mandar Hill to Hansdiha was inaugurated on 22 December 2012. The 14 km line from Dumka to Barapalasi station was commissioned in February 2014. The remaining section from Barapalasi to Hansdiha was opened for passenger trains on 28 September 2016. This Bhagalpur–Dumka–Rampurhat railway line serves as alternative option for railway traffic from Bhagalpur to Howrah and decreases distance between Bhagalpur and Howrah by nearly 70 kilometers.

=== Deoghar–Banka line ===
Two lines branch out from Deoghar Junction railway station. The railway line to Dumka goes east of Deoghar. The other line to Banka goes towards the north and connects with Banka railway station passing through New Nawadih, Chandan, Bhalua, Katoria, Kharjhounsa and Kakwara railway stations. The railway line will serve devotees once a direct train start running between Deoghar and Sultanganj via Bhagalpur, Banka. A daily passenger train runs between Jasidih and Banka which operates once a day, except on Sundays.

== Trains ==
One MEMU train(63081/82) runs from Jasidih to Rampurhat, while three such trains run to Dumka. Passenger train service exists from Dumka to Rampurhat, Bhagalpur and Godda. One intercity train runs from Dumka to Ranchi via Jasidih. One express train named Kaviguru Express runs between Jamalpur and Howrah via Dumka. Banka–Rajendra Nagar Terminal Intercity Express and Deoghar–Agartala Weekly Express run on Deoghar–Banka–Bhagalpur line. 12349/50 Godda–New Delhi Humsafar Express and 22309/10 Jamalpur-Howrah Vandebharat Express are some premium trains which run on this route, connecting Santhal Parganas to the national capital.

== Further extensions ==
The railways have proposed a Jasidih–bypass line after construction of which trains from Bhagalpur and Dumka can proceed to Asansol and Dhanbad without locomotive reversal at Jasidih, also saving time for the passengers. Deoghar Junction is being developed as a major halt station to decongest Jasidih and avoid a delay of more than 30 minutes for an engine change at Jasidih. There are also surveys going on for a new line to connect Banka with Nawada railway station on the Gaya–Kiul line via Jamui.

=== Deoghar–Sultanganj line ===
A 116-kilometre (72 mi)-long new railway line was proposed to be built between Deoghar & Sultanganj in Bihar in the budget of 2007–08. The line is proposed to branch of from Katoriya railway station on the Deoghar-Banka line and reach Sultanganj railway station on the Sahibganj loop via Belhar, Sangrampur, Tarapur & Asarganj. Work however has not begun yet due to non-acquisition of land.

=== Jasidih–Pirpainti line ===
The 97-kilometre (60 mi)-long Jasidih–Hansdiha–Pirpainti line is under construction. As of 2021, work is under progress in Mohanpur–Hansdiha and Godda–Pirpainti sections. The 32-kilometre (20 mi) Hansdiha–Godda section was inaugurated on 8 April 2021 and a Humsafar Express runs weekly from Godda to New Delhi. This line is considered important to connect the Godda district in the Santhal Pargana division of Jharkhand with the rest of India. The 80-kilometre (50 mi) Godda–Pakur line is also planned.

== See also ==
- Indian Railways
- Jasidih Junction
- Rampurhat Junction
- Dumka railway station
- Banka railway station
- Bhagalpur Junction
- Basukinath railway station
- Santhal Pargana division
- Eastern Railway zone
