= Hansdiha =

- Village
- Location in Jharkhand, India Hansdiha (India)
- Coordinates: 24°36′02″N 87°04′56″E
- Country: India
- State: Jharkhand
- District: Dumka district
- Elevation: 190 m (620 ft)

Population (2011)
  - Total: 4,182

Languages
- Time zone: UTC+5:30 (IST)
- PIN: 814145

Hansdiha is a village in the Community development block of Saraiyahat in the Dumka Sadar subdivision of the Dumka district, Jharkhand state of India.

== Geography ==
Cities, towns and locations in the Deoghar, Dumka and Jamtara districts in Santhal Pargana Division
M: Municipality, CT: census town, R: Rural/ Urban centre, D: Dam,
Owing to space constraints in the small map, the actual locations in a larger map may vary slightly

=== Location ===
Hansdiha is located in the northeast region of Jharkhand and located near Bihar border. Hansdiha is located on National Highway 133 between Deoghar and Godda in the Dumka district in Jharkhand state.

=== Overview ===
The area is a plateau with low hills except in the eastern portion with the Rajmahal hills and Ramgarh hills. The south-western portion is a rolling upland. The area is overwhelmingly rural with small pockets of urbanisation.

== Demographics ==
As per 2011 Census of India, Hansdiha had a total population of 4,182 of which 2,210 (53%) were males and 1,972 (47%) were females. Population below 6 years was 705. The literacy rate was 78.29% of the population over 6 years. The sex ratio was 892 females per thousand males.

== Education ==
- Jawahar Navodaya Vidalaya for Dumka district is on southern outskirts of Hansdiha. It was established in 1986.
- Phulo-Jhano Murmu College Of Dairy Technology, established in 2019 and affiliated to Birsa Agricultural University.
