= Mandar Hill railway station =

Railway station in Banka, Bihar, India

MANDAR HILL
- Indian Railways logo

General information
- Location: Station Road, SH 23, Bounsi, Banka district, Bihar 813104; India
- Coordinates: 18.9131°N 83.8494°E
- Elevation: 107 metres (351 ft)
- System: Indian Railways station
- Owner: Indian Railways
- Operator: Eastern Railway zone
- Line: Bhagalpur – Dumka line
- Platforms: 3
- Tracks: 3
- Connections: Dumka, Bhagalpur

Construction
- Structure type: At–grade
- Parking: Available

Other information
- Status: Functioning
- Station code: MDLE
- Zone(s): Eastern Railway zone
- Division(s): Malda railway division
- Fare zone: Indian Railways
Location
- Location within India Location within India
- Interactive map of Mandar Hill

Mandar Hill railway station (station code: MDLE), is a railway station on the Bhagalpur–Dumka railway line in Banka district of the Indian state of Bihar. It is in the Malda railway division of the Eastern Railway zone of Indian Railways.

== History ==
It's been a broad gauge track since 1893. The track was extended southwards to Hansdiha in 2014 and further connected to Dumka in 2015.

== Station layout ==
G	Street level	Exit/Entrance & ticket counter
P1	FOB, Side platform, No-1 doors will open on the left/right
P1	Track 1
P1	Track 2	→
P1	FOB, Island platform, No- 2 doors will open on the left/right
P1	Island platform, No- 3 doors will open on the left/right
P1	Track 3

== Trains ==
Four passenger trains running between Bhagalpur junction and Godda and Dumka stop at Mandar Hill railway station.

Following Express trains halts here:

- Howrah–Bhagalpur Vande Bharat Express
- Dibrugarh - Deogarh Express
- Godda–New Delhi Humsafar Express
- Jamalpur - Howrah Kaviguru Express
- Ranchi–Godda Intercity Express

== Nearest airport ==
The nearest airports are Deoghar Airport at Deoghar Jharkhand, Birsa Munda Airport at Ranchi, Gaya Airport, Lok Nayak Jayaprakash Airport at Patna and Netaji Subhas Chandra Bose International Airport at Kolkata.

== See also ==
- Banka, Bihar
- Jasidih Junction
- Bhagalpur Junction
- Jasidih–Dumka–Rampurhat line
- Dumka
- List of railway stations in India
