= Dumka–Bhagalpur line =

Railway route in India

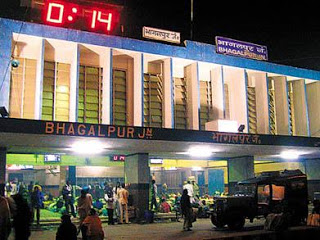
- Bhagalpur Junction, one of the two termini of Dumka–Bhagalpur line

Overview
- Status: Operational
- Owner: Indian Railways
- Locale: Jharkhand, Bihar
- Termini: Dumka; Bhagalpur Junction

Service
- Type: Rail line
- Operator(s): Eastern Railway

History
- Opened: 1907 Bhagalpur–Mandar Hill branch 2012 Mandar Hill–Hansdiha section 2014 Hansdiha–Barapalasi section 2016 Barapalasi–Dumka section 2021 Hansdiha–Godda branch line

Technical
- Track length: 115 km
- Track gauge: 5 ft 6 in (1,676 mm) broad gauge
- Operating speed: 110 km/h (68 mph)

The Dumka–Bhagalpur line is an Indian railway line connecting Dumka on the Jasidih–Dumka–Rampurhat line with Bhagalpur Junction on the Sahibganj loop. This 115-kilometre (71 mi) track is under the jurisdiction of Malda Division of Eastern Railway.An amount of ₹3,169 crore has been sanctioned for doubling the 180 km single line on the Rampurhat–Dumka–Bhagalpur section. The project is targeted to be completed by the year 2027

== History ==
The Bhagalpur-Mandar Hill branch line was constructed in 1893. The construction of a new Dumka–Bhagalpur railway line was taken up as an associated project of Jasidih–Dumka–Rampurhat line to connect Dumka with Bhagalpur. The new railway line branches off from Dumka towards the north and connects with Bhagalpur railway junction. The 51 km railway line from Bhagalpur to Banka and Mandar Hill already existed. The railway was extended from Mandar Hill to Hansdiha was inaugurated on 22 December 2012. The 14 km line from Dumka to Barapalasi station was commissioned in February 2014. The remaining section from Barapalasi to Hansdiha was opened for passenger trains on 28 September 2016. This line will serves as second alternative option for railway traffic to Howrah and Bhagalpur and decreases distance between Bhagalpur and Howrah by nearly 70 kilometres.

== Trains ==
Passenger train services exist from Bhagalpur to Banka, Dumka and Godda. One express train named Kaviguru Express runs between Jamalpur and Howrah via Dumka. Banka–Rajendra Nagar Terminal Intercity Express and Deoghar–Agartala Weekly Express run on Deoghar–Banka–Bhagalpur line. Godda–New Delhi Humsafar Express is the only premium train which runs on this route and Ranchi Godda Exp runs as a triweekly service on this route, connecting Santhal Parganas to the national capital and Jharkhand's capital.

== Further extension ==
The 97-kilometre (60 mi)-long Jasidih–Hansdiha–Pirpainti line is under construction. As of April 2026, The Mohanpur–Hansdiha is completed and trains are running, while the Godda–Pirpainti sections is in the process of track laying. The 32-kilometre (20 mi) Hansdiha–Godda section was inaugurated on 8 April 2021 and a Humsafar Express runs weekly from Godda to New Delhi. This line is considered important to connect the Godda district in the Santhal Pargana division of Jharkhand with the rest of India. The 80-kilometre (50 mi) Godda–Pakur line is also planned

== Trains ==
The Following trains are famously serving this route.

- Howrah-Bhagalpur Vande Bharat Express
- Dumka-Patna Express
- Howrah-Jamalpur Kavi Guru Express
