= Dumka district =

Coordinates: 24.2667°N 87.25°E

Dumka district Dumkā Jilā
- District of Jharkhand
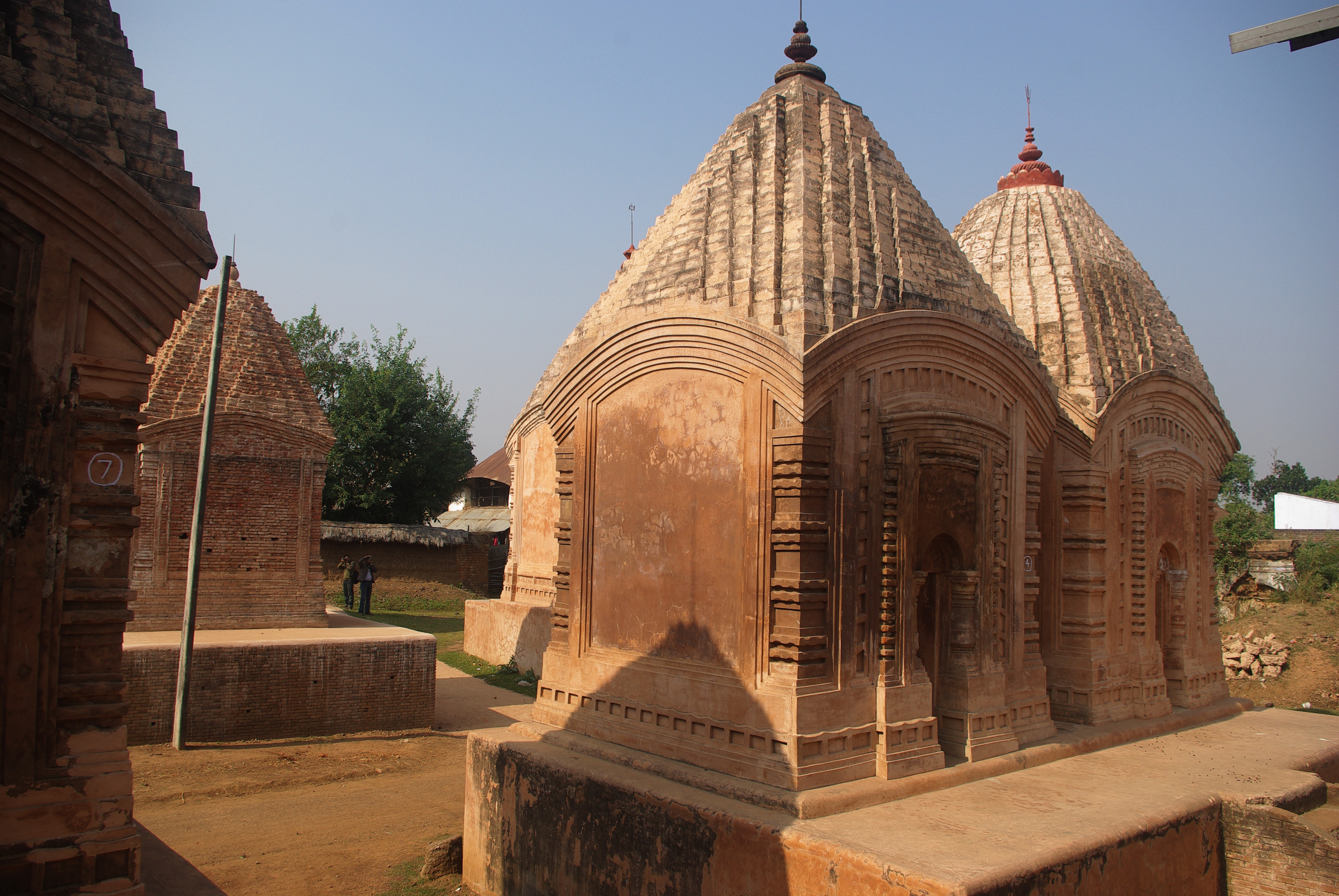
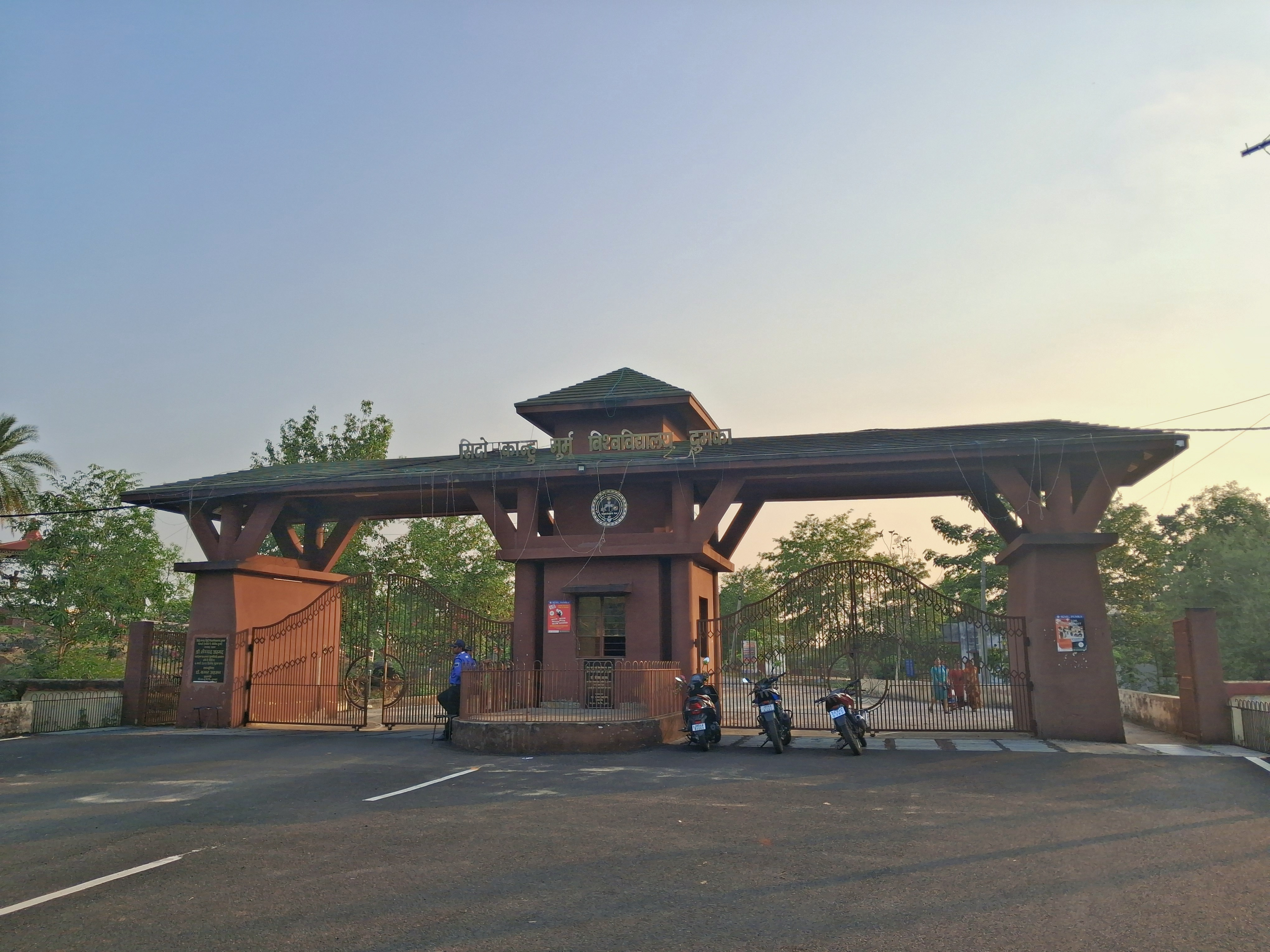
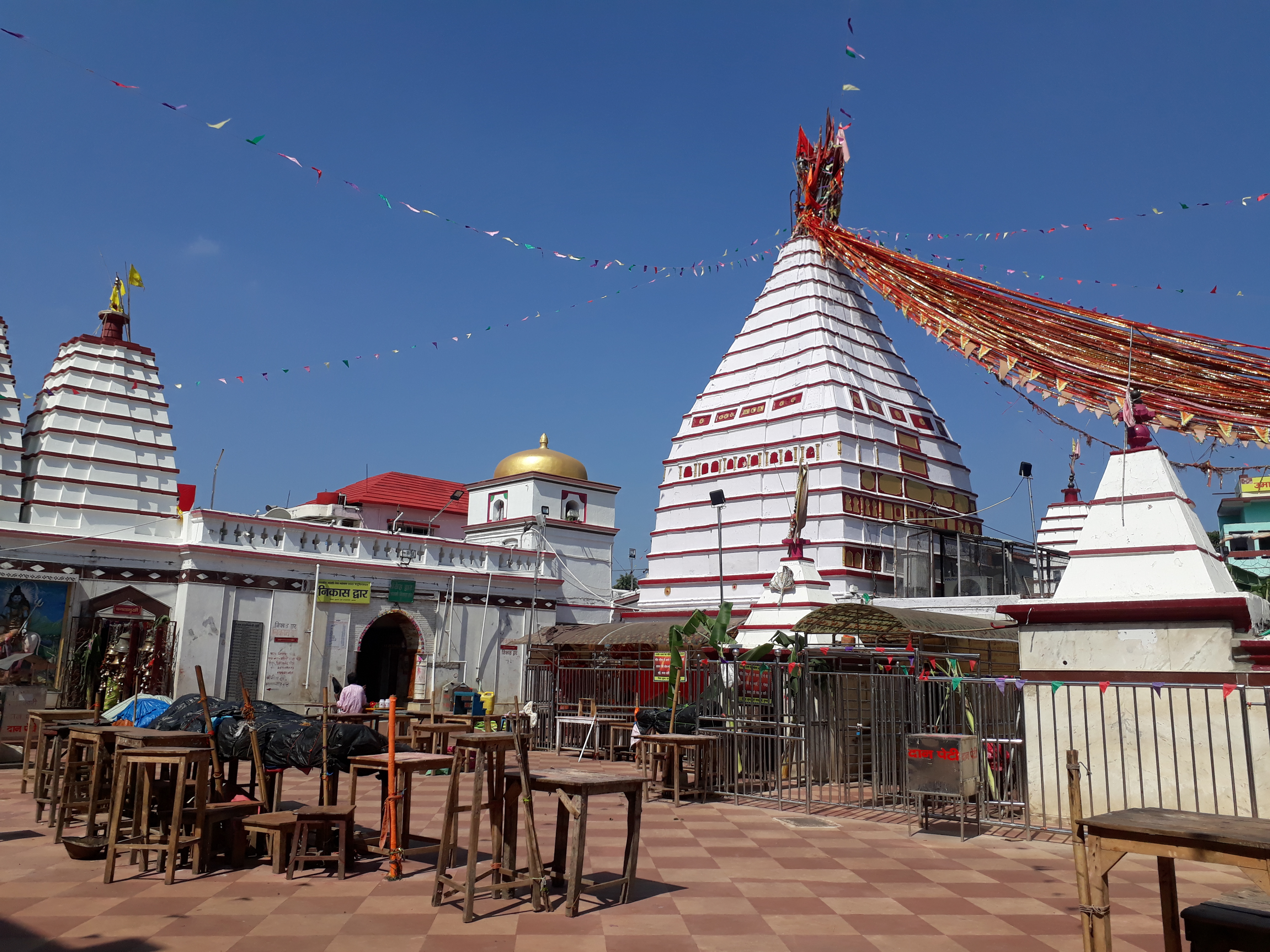
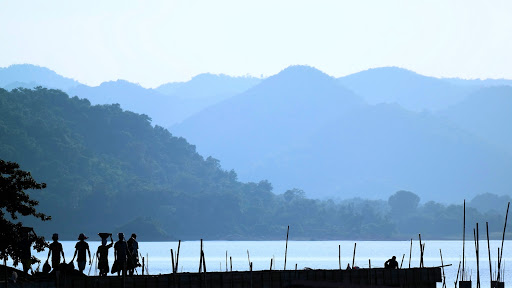
- Top to bottom Maluti temples, Entrance gate of Sido Kanhu Murmu University, Basukinath Temple, Massanjore Dam
- Interactive map of Dumka district
- Country: India
- State: Jharkhand
- Division: Santhal Pargana
- Headquarters: Dumka

Government
  - Deputy Commissioner: Sri Anjaneyulu Dodde (IAS)
  - Superintendent of police: Sri Pitamber Singh Kherwar (IPS)
  - Lok Sabha constituencies: Dumka
  - Vidhan Sabha constituencies: 4

Area
  - Total: 3,716 km^{2} (1,435 sq mi)
  - Rank: 9th

Population (2011)
  - Total: 1,321,442
  - Rank: 11th
  - Density: 355.6/km^{2} (921.0/sq mi)
  - Rank: 15th

Demographics
  - Literacy: 61.02 per cent
  - Sex ratio: 974
- Time zone: UTC+05:30 (IST)
- Website: dumka.nic.in

Dumka district is one of the twenty-four districts of Jharkhand state in eastern India. Dumka is the administrative headquarters of this district. This district covers an area of 3716.02 km^{2}. This district has a population of 1,321,442 (2011 Census). Dumka district is located in the eastern part of Jharkhand.

== Economy ==
In 2006, the Indian government named Dumka one of the country's 250 most backward districts (out of a total of 640). It is one of the 21 districts in Jharkhand currently receiving funds from the Backward Regions Grant Fund Programme (BRGF).

== Demographics ==
Historical population

Year	Pop.	±% p.a.
1901	417,465	—
1911	434,344	+0.40%
1921	414,970	−0.46%
1931	474,314	+1.35%
1941	516,936	+0.86%
1951	537,200	+0.39%

Year	Pop.	±% p.a.
1961	609,812	+1.28%
1971	713,444	+1.58%
1981	780,258	+0.90%
1991	950,835	+2.00%
2001	1,106,521	+1.53%
2011	1,321,442	+1.79%

Religion in Dumka district (2011)
Religion	Percent
Hinduism	79.06%
Islam	8.09%
Christianity	6.54%
Sarna	5.95%
Other or not stated	0.36%

According to the 2011 census Dumka district has a population of 1,321,442, roughly equal to the nation of Mauritius or the US state of New Hampshire. This gives it a ranking of 370th in India (out of a total of 640). The district has a population density of 300 inhabitants per square kilometre (780/sq mi). Its population growth rate over the decade 2001-2011 was 19.39%. Dumka has a sex ratio of 974 females for every 1000 males, and a literacy rate of 61.02%. 6.82% of the population lives in urban areas. Scheduled Castes and Scheduled Tribes make up 6.02% and 43.22% of the population respectively.

Languages of Dumka district (2011)
1. Santali (39.7%)
2. Khortha (34.4%)
3. Bengali (9.59%)
4. Hindi (6.64%)
5. 'Other' Hindi (3.02%)
6. Malto (2.40%)
7. Urdu (1.86%)
8. Others (2.34%)

At the time of the 2011 Census of India, 39.71% of the population spoke Santali, 34.44% Khortha, 9.59% Bengali, 6.64% Hindi, 2.40% Malto and 1.86% Urdu as their first language. 3.02% of the population recorded their language as 'Others' under Hindi.

== Politics ==
District	No.	Constituency	Name	Party	Alliance	Remarks	Dumka	7	Sikaripara	Alok Kumar Soren
Dumka	10	Dumka	Basant Soren	JMM						
Dumka	11	Jama	Louis Marandi	JMM						
Dumka	12	Jarmundi	Devendra Kunwar	BJP	NDA					

== Villages ==
- Kumirdaha

== See also ==
- Maluti temples
