= Malda railway division =

Railway division of India

Malda railway division is one of the four railway divisions under the jurisdiction of Eastern Railway zone of the Indian Railways. This railway division was formed in 1975 and its headquarters is located at Malda in West Bengal, India.

Asansol railway division, Sealdah railway division and Howrah railway division are the other railway divisions under the ER Zone headquartered at Kolkata.

== List of railway stations and towns ==
The list includes the stations under the Malda railway division and their station category.

Category of station	No. of stations	Names of stations
A-1	2	Malda Town, Bhagalpur
A	2	Jamalpur Junction, New Farakka Junction
B	4	Kahalgaon, Sultanganj, Sahibganj Junction And Barharwa Junction
C	-	suburban stations
D	13	-
E	39	-
F	40	halt stations
Total	100	-

The symbol - indicates stations closed for passengers.
