= Eastern Railway zone =

Railway zone of India

Eastern Railway

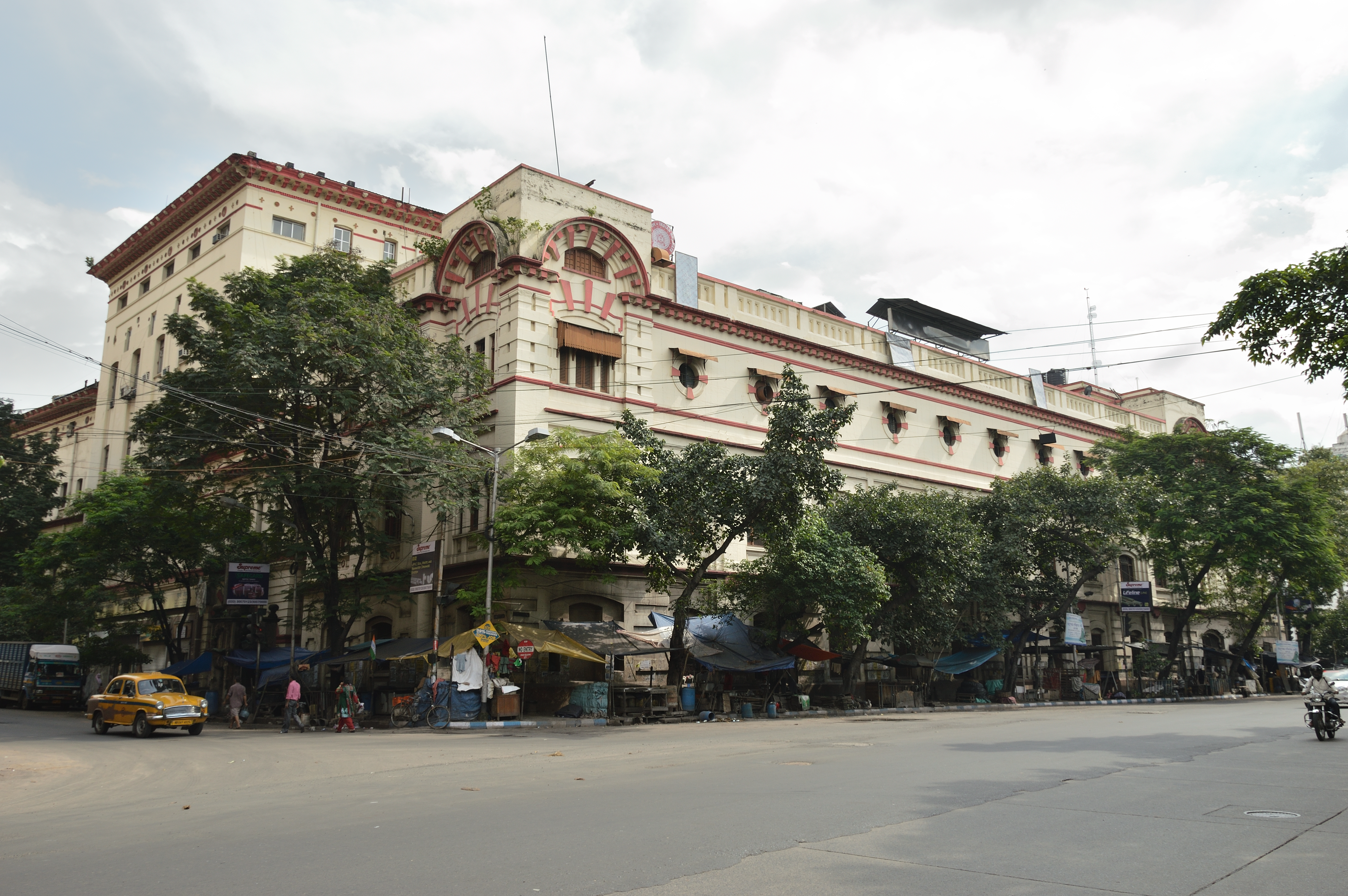
- Eastern Railway HQ, Kolkata

Overview
- Headquarters: Fairley Place, Kolkata
- Locale: West Bengal and Jharkhand, and some parts of Bihar
- Dates of operation: 14 April 1952; 74 years ago–
- Predecessor: East Indian Railway

Technical
- Track gauge: Broad gauge (BG) & narrow gauge (NG)
- Electrification: 2,222.620 kilometres (1,381.072 mi)
- Length: 2,823.146 kilometres (1,754.222 mi)

Other
- Website: Eastern Railway

The Eastern Railway (abbreviated ER) is among the 19 zones of the Indian Railways. Its headquarters is at Fairley Place (Kolkata) and comprises four divisions: Howrah, Malda, Sealdah, and Asansol. Each division is headed by a Divisional Railway Manager (DRM). The name of the division denotes the name of the city where the divisional headquarters is located.

Eastern Railway oversees the largest and second largest rail complexes in the country, Howrah Junction and Sealdah railway station, and also contains the highest number of A1 and A Category Stations like Howrah, Malda Town, Sealdah, Asansol, Kolkata, Durgapur, Barddhaman, Jasidih, Madhupur, Rampurhat Junction, Bhagalpur, Jamalpur, Bandel, Katwa and Naihati. Eastern Railways operates India's oldest train, Kalka Mail.

== History ==
The East Indian Railway (EIR) Company was incorporated in 1845 to connect eastern India with Delhi. The first train ran here between Howrah and Hooghly on 15 August 1854. The train left Howrah station at 8:30 a.m. and reached Hooghly in 91 minutes. The management of the East Indian Railway was taken over by the British Indian government on 1 January 1925.

The Eastern Railway was formed on 14 April 1952 by amalgamating three lower divisions of the East Indian Railway: Howrah, Asansol and Danapur, the entire Bengal Nagpur Railway (BNR) and the Sealdah division of the erstwhile Bengal Assam Railway (which was already added to the East Indian Railway on 15 August 1947). On 1 August 1955, the portions of BNR stretching from Howrah to Visakhapatnam in the South which is now the Headquarters of South Coast Railway zone, Howrah to Nagpur in the Central area and up to Katni in the North Central Region were separated from Eastern Railway and became the South Eastern Railway. Three more divisions: Dhanbad, Mughalsarai and Malda were formed later. Till 30 September 2002 ER consisted seven divisions.

On 1 October 2002 a new zone, the East Central Railway, headquarters at Hajipur, was carved out by separating the Eastern Railway's Danapur, Dhanbad and Mughalsarai divisions from it. Presently, it comprises four divisions and they are Malda Town, Howrah, Sealdah and Asansol.

In 2021, Eastern Railway completed full electrification of its 2010 km rail network in West Bengal, while in 2022, its entire network of 2848 km was electrified with the conversion of the Hansdiha-Godda section.

== Divisions ==
- Howrah railway division
- Sealdah railway division
- Asansol railway division
- Malda railway division

== Routes ==
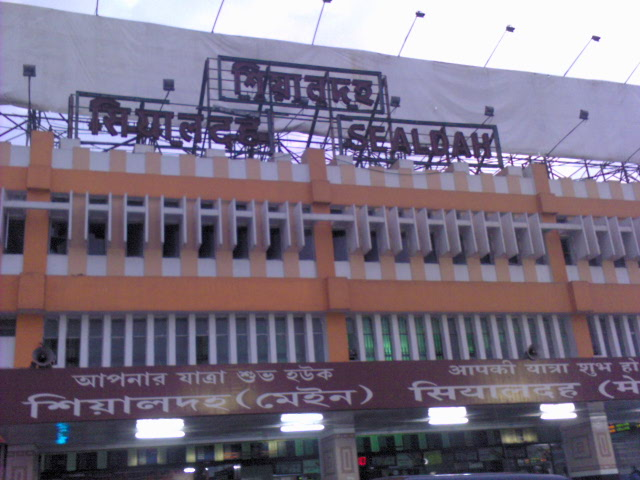
Sealdah Main railway station

=== Trunk routes ===
Howrah–Delhi main line

- Howrah–Bardhaman main line
- Howrah–Bardhaman chord line
- Bardhaman–Asansol section
- Asansol–Rajla section of Asansol–Patna line

Grand Chord and Howrah–Allahabad–Mumbai line

- Howrah–Bardhaman main line
- Howrah–Bardhaman chord line
- Bardhaman–Asansol section
- Asansol–Chhota Ambana section of Asansol–Gaya line

Sahibganj loop

- Khana–Rampurhat section of Sahibganj Loop

Howrah–New Jalpaiguri line

- Howrah–Bardhaman main line
- Howrah–Bardhaman chord line
- Bardhaman–Khana section of Bardhaman–Asansol line
- Khana–Gumani section of Sahibganj loop
- Gumani–New Farraka section of Barharwa–Azimganj–Katwa loop
- New Farakka–Malda Town section of New Farakka–Barsoi line

=== Branch lines ===
- Rampurhat-Dumka-Jasidih Line
- Ahmadpur–Katwa line
- Andal–Sainthia branch line
- Andal–Sitarampur loop line
- Bardhaman–Katwa line
- Barharwa–Azimganj–Katwa loop
- Deoghar–Banka–Bhagalpur branch line
- Dumka–Bhagalpur line
- Madhupur–Giridih branch line
- Howrah–Belur Math branch line
- Nalhati–Azimganj branch line
- Krishnanagar–Nabadwip Ghat line (NG under conversion)
- Ranaghat–Lalgola line
- Ranaghat–Gede line
- Ranaghat–Shantipur–Krishnanagar line
- Ranaghat–Bangaon line
- Seoraphuli–Tarakeswar–Goghat line
- Sealdah–Barasat–Bangaon line
- Barasat–Hasnabad line
- Sealdah–Ranaghat line
- Naihati–Bandel branch line
- Kalyani–Kalyani Simanta branch line
- Sealdah–Budge Budge line
- Sealdah–Diamond Harbour line
- Sealdah–Canning line
- Sealdah–Namkhana line
- Kolkata Circular Railway
- Calcutta Chord line
- Jasidih-Satsang Nagar-Baidynathdham Railway Branch Line

=== Discontinued routes ===
- Dum Dum Cantonment–Biman Bandar branch line

== EMU Carsheds ==
- Howrah EMU Carshed (HWH)
- Bandel EMU Carshed (BDC)
- Narkeldanga EMU Carshed (NKG)
- Ranaghat EMU Carshed (RHA)
- Barasat EMU Carshed (BT)
- Sonarpur EMU Carshed (SPR)

== Loco Sheds ==
- Electric Loco Shed, Howrah (HWH)
- Diesel Loco Shed, Howrah (HWH-D)
- Electric Loco Shed, Sealdah (SDAH)
- Electric Loco Shed, Asansol (ASN)
- Electric Loco Shed, Bardhaman (BWN)
- Diesel Loco Shed, Andal (UDL)
- Electric & Diesel Loco Shed, Jamalpur (JMP)

== See also ==
- All India Station Masters' Association (AISMA)
- Zones and divisions of Indian Railways
