= Harinsing railway station =

Railway station in Jharkhand

General information
- Location: Makrapahari, Dumka district, Jharkhand; India
- Coordinates: 24.23907°N 87.574071°E
- Elevation: 92 metres (302 ft)
- System: Indian Railways station
- Owner: Indian Railways
- Line: Jasidih–Dumka–Rampurhat line
- Platforms: 3
- Tracks: 1 (Single electric line)

Construction
- Structure type: Standard (on-ground station)
- Parking: Yes
- Cycle facilities: No

Other information
- Status: Functioning
- Station code: HRNS
- Zone(s): Eastern Railway
- Division(s): Howrah

History
- Opened: 2014–15
- Electrified: 2020

Services
Preceding station	Indian Railways	Following station
Pinargaria towards Rampurhat Junction	Eastern Railway zone Rampurhat–Jasidih line	Ambajora Shikaripara towards Jasidih Junction
Location

Harinsing railway station is a railway station on the Jasidih–Dumka–Rampurhat line under the Howrah railway division of the Eastern Railway. It is situated at Makrapahari, Dumka district in the Indian state of Jharkhand.

== History ==
Jasidih Junction to Dumka railway line became operational on 12 July 2011 and Dumka to Ambajora Shikaripara track was set up in June 2014. The track from Rampurhat to Pinargaria became operational on 25 November 2012. The complete single railway route from Dumka to Rampurhat, including Harinsing railway station became operational on 4 June 2015.

== See also ==
- Dumka
- Indian Railways
- Jasidih Junction
- Jasidih–Dumka–Rampurhat line
- Baidyanathdham Deoghar
- List of railway stations in India
