= Pinargaria railway station =

Railway station in West Bengal

General information
- Location: Pinargaria, Jharkhand; India
- Coordinates: 24.211048°N 87.642332°E
- Elevation: 71 metres (233 ft)
- System: Indian Railways station
- Owner: Indian Railways
- Line: Jasidih–Dumka–Rampurhat line
- Platforms: 2
- Tracks: 1 (Single diesel line)

Construction
- Structure type: Standard (on-ground station)
- Parking: Yes
- Cycle facilities: No

Other information
- Status: Functioning
- Station code: PRGR
- Zone(s): Eastern Railway
- Division(s): Howrah

History
- Opened: 2014–15
- Electrified: 2020

Services
| Preceding station | Indian Railways | Following station |
|---|---|---|
| Adalpahari towards Rampurhat Junction | Eastern Railway zone Rampurhat–Jasidih line | Harinsing towards Jasidih Junction |
Location

Pinargaria railway station is a railway station on the Jasidih–Dumka–Rampurhat line under the Howrah railway division of the Eastern Railway. It is situated at Pinargaria, Jharkhand.

== History ==
Jasidih Junction to Dumka railway line became operational on 12 July 2011 and Dumka to Ambajora Shikaripara track was set up in June 2014. The track from Rampurhat to Pinargaria became operational on 25 November 2012. The complete single railway route from Dumka to Rampurhat, including Pinargaria railway station became operational on 4 June 2015.
