= Adalpahari railway station =

Railway station in West Bengal, India

General information
- Location: Narayanpur Road, Chakaipur, Adalpahari, Birbhum district, West Bengal; India
- Coordinates: 24.208218°N 87.709578°E
- Elevation: 56 metres (184 ft)
- System: Indian Railways station
- Owner: Indian Railways
- Line: Jasidih–Dumka–Rampurhat line
- Platforms: 1
- Tracks: 1 (Single diesel line)

Construction
- Structure type: Standard (on-ground station)
- Parking: Yes
- Cycle facilities: No

Other information
- Status: Functioning
- Station code: ALPD
- Zone(s): Eastern Railway
- Division(s): Howrah

History
- Opened: 2014–15

Services
| Preceding station | Indian Railways | Following station |
|---|---|---|
| Rampurhat Junction Terminus | Eastern Railway zone Rampurhat–Jasidih line | Pinargaria towards Jasidih Junction |
Location

Adalpahari railway station is a railway station on the Jasidih–Dumka–Rampurhat line under the Howrah railway division of the Eastern Railway. It is situated beside Narayanpur Road at Chakaipur, Adalpahari, Birbhum district in the Indian state of West Bengal.

== History ==
Jasidih Junction to Dumka railway line became operational on 12 July 2011 and Dumka to Ambajora Shikaripara track was set up in June 2014. The track from Rampurhat to Pinargaria became operational on 25 November 2012. The complete single railway route from Dumka to Rampurhat, including Adalpahari railway station became operational on 4 June 2015.
