= Mohanpur railway station =

Railway station in Jharkhand, India

Mohanpur Junction Railway Station

General information
- Location: Katban Chhit, Mohanpur, Deoghar, Deoghar district, Jharkhand; India
- Coordinates: 24.488461°N 87.785648°E
- System: Indian Railways station
- Owner: Indian Railways
- Lines: Jasidih–Dumka–Rampurhat line Mohanpur-Hansdiha line
- Platforms: 4
- Tracks: 4 (Single electric line)

Construction
- Structure type: Standard (on-ground station)
- Cycle facilities: No

Other information
- Status: Functioning
- Station code: MHUR
- Zone(s): Eastern Railway
- Division(s): Asansol

History
- Opened: 2014–15

Services
Preceding station	Indian Railways	Following station
Ghormara towards Rampurhat Junction	Eastern Railway zone Rampurhat–Jasidih line	Deoghar Junction towards Jasidih Junction
Location

Mohanpur Junction railway station (station code: MHUR) is a railway station on the Jasidih–Dumka–Rampurhat line under the Asansol railway division of the Eastern Railway. It is situated at Katban Chhit, Mohanpur, Deoghar, Deoghar district in the Indian state of Jharkhand.

== History ==
Jasidih Junction to Dumka railway line became operational on 12 July 2011 and Dumka to Ambajora Shikaripara track was set up in June 2014. The track from Rampurhat to Pinargaria became operational on 25 November 2012. The complete single railway route from Dumka to Rampurhat, including Mohanpur railway station became operational on 4 June 2015.

== Further extension ==
The 97-kilometre (60 mi)-long Jasidih–Hansdiha–Pirpainti line is under construction. As of March 2021, work is under progress on Godda–Pirpainti sections. Mohanpur-Hansdiha–Godda section has been completed and a Humsafar Express from Godda to New Delhi is running weekly. This line is considered important to connect the Godda district in the Santhal Pargana division of Jharkhand with the rest of India. The 80-kilometre (50 mi) Godda–Pakur line is also planned.
