= Ghormara railway station =

Railway station in Jharkhand

Ghormara Railway Station

General information
- Location: Ghormara, Deoghar district, Jharkhand; India
- Coordinates: 24.442298°N 87.86392°E
- Elevation: 252 metres (827 ft)
- System: Indian Railways station
- Owner: Indian Railways
- Line: Jasidih–Dumka–Rampurhat line
- Platforms: 3
- Tracks: 1 (Single diesel line)

Construction
- Structure type: Standard (on-ground station)
- Cycle facilities: No

Other information
- Status: Functioning
- Station code: GRMA
- Zone(s): Eastern Railway
- Division(s): Asansol

History
- Opened: 2014–15

Services
Preceding station	Indian Railways	Following station
Chandanpahari towards ?	South Eastern Railway zone Rampurhat–Jasidih line	Mohanpur towards ?
Location

Ghormara Railway Station is a railway station on the Jasidih–Dumka–Rampurhat line under the Asansol railway division of the Eastern Railway. It is situated at Ghormara, Deoghar district in the Indian state of Jharkhand. It has 3 platforms, out of which the trains mostly comes on platform no 1 and 2.

== History ==
Jasidih Junction to Dumka railway line became operational on 12 July 2011 and Dumka to Ambajora Shikaripara track was set up in June 2014. The track from Rampurhat to Pinargaria became operational on 25 November 2012. The complete single railway route from Dumka to Rampurhat, including Ghormara railway station became operational on 4 June 2015.
