= BRMA =

BRMA may refer to:

- Belgian Recorded Music Association
- Maranhão (ISO 3166 region code BR-MA), Northeast, Brazil; a Brazilian state
- Barmasia railway station (station code BRMA), Barmasia, Dumka, Jharkhand, India
- Broad Rental Market Area, a geographical area where a person could reasonably be expected to live in the UK; see History of rent control in England and Wales
- Bureau of Mining Research in Algeria, a predecessor to the Bureau de Recherches Géologiques et Minières

== See also ==
- Brma Paemnebi, 2013 film
- Burma (disambiguation)
