= Varanasi–Deoghar Vande Bharat Express =

Mini Vande Bharat Express train route in India

Varanasi Junction – Deoghar Junction Vande Bharat Express
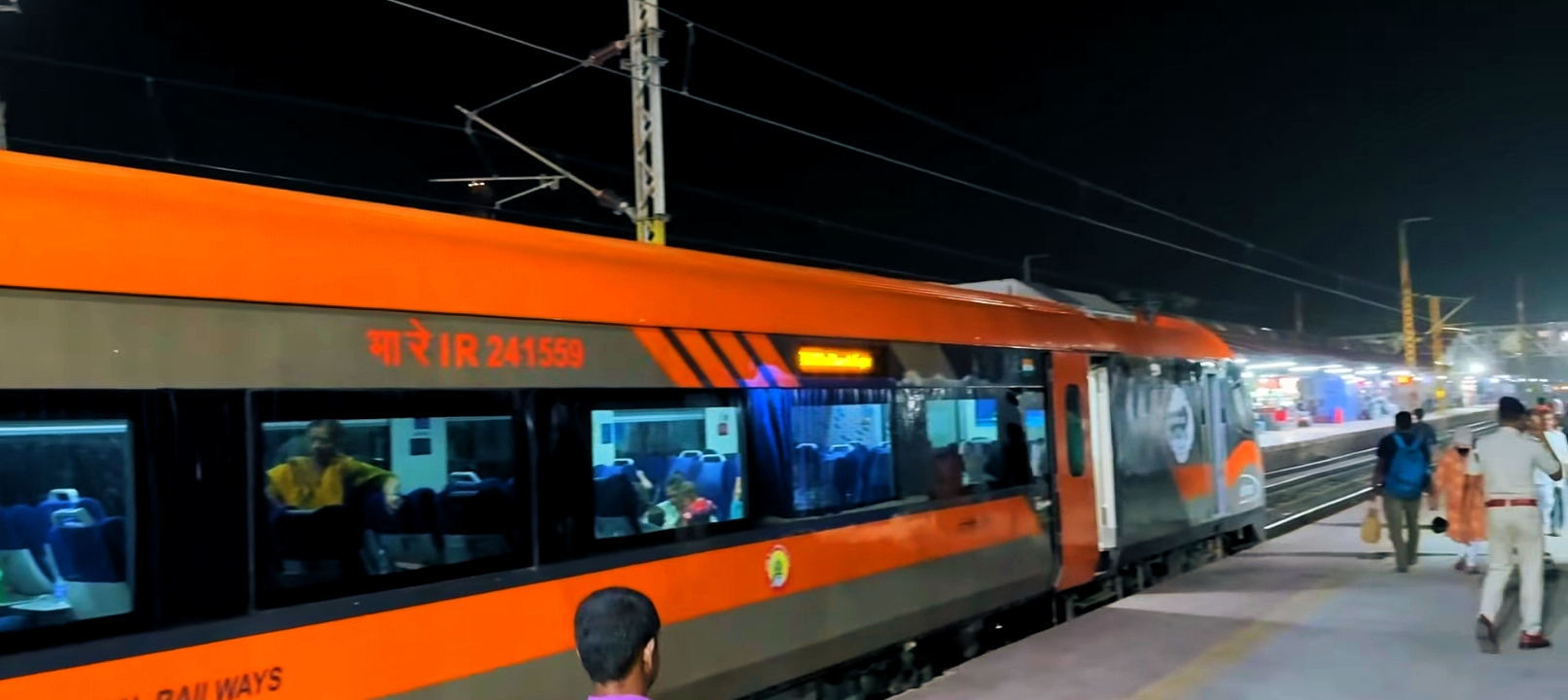
- Varanasi Junction – Deoghar Junction Vande Bharat Express At Gaya Junction

Overview
- Service type: Vande Bharat Express
- Locale: Uttar Pradesh, Bihar and Jharkhand
- First service: 15 September 2024 (Inaugural); 16 September 2024; 13 months ago (Commercial)
- Current operator: Northern Railways (NR)

Route
- Termini: Varanasi Junction (BSB); Deoghar Junction (DGHR)
- Stops: 06
- Distance travelled: 456 km (283 mi)
- Average journey time: 07 hrs 20 mins
- Service frequency: Six days a week (Note: Except Tuesdays)
- Train number: 22500/22499
- Lines used: Varanasi–DDU line; DDU–Gaya section; Gaya-Kiul line; Patna–Asansol section (till Jasidih Junction); Jasidih–Dumka–Rampurhat line (till Deoghar Junction)

On-board services
- Classes: AC Chair Car, AC Executive Chair Car
- Seating arrangements: Airline style; Rotatable seats
- Sleeping arrangements: No
- Catering facilities: On board Catering
- Observation facilities: Large windows in all coaches
- Entertainment facilities: On-board WiFi; Infotainment System; Electric outlets; Reading light; Seat Pockets; Bottle Holder; Tray Table
- Baggage facilities: Overhead racks
- Other facilities: Kavach

Technical
- Rolling stock: Vande Bharat 2.0
- Track gauge: Indian gauge 1,676 mm (5 ft 6 in) broad gauge
- Electrification: 25 kV 50 Hz AC Overhead line
- Operating speed: 62 km/h (39 mph) (Avg.)
- Average length: 384 metres (1,260 ft) (16 coaches)
- Track owner: Indian Railways
- Rake maintenance: (TBC)

The 22500/22499 Varanasi - Deoghar Vande Bharat Express is India's 61st Vande Bharat Express train, connecting the Ganges city of Varanasi in Uttar Pradesh with the holy pilgrimage city of Deoghar in Jharkhand.

This express train was inaugurated on September 15 2024, by Prime Minister Narendra Modi via video conferencing from the capital city of Ranchi instead of physically inaugurating at Tatanagar Junction in Jharkhand due to continuous rains in Jamshedpur.

== Overview ==
This train is currently operated by Indian Railways, connecting Varanasi Jn, Pandit Deen Dayal Upadhyaya Jn, Sasaram Jn, Gaya Jn, Nawada, Kiul Jn, Jasidih Jn and Deoghar Jn. It currently operates with train numbers 22500/22499 on 6 days a week basis.

== Rakes ==
It is the fifty-eighth 2nd Generation and forty-first Mini Vande Bharat 2.0 Express train which was designed and manufactured by the Integral Coach Factory at Perambur, Chennai under the Make in India Initiative.

== Service ==
The 22500/22499 Varanasi - Deoghar Vande Bharat Express currently operates 6 days a week, covering a distance of 456 km (283 mi) in a travel time of 07 hrs 20 mins with average speed of 62 km/h. The Maximum Permissible Speed (MPS) will be confirmed after commercial run.

== See also ==
- Vande Bharat Express
- Tejas Express
- Gatiman Express
- Varanasi Junction railway station
- Deoghar Junction railway station
