= BCQ =

BCQ may refer to:

- Barachak railway station, West Bengal, India (station code)
- Bible College of Queensland, Australia
- Brak Airport, Libya (IATA code)
- British Cycle Quest, a competition
- Business Communication Quarterly, an academic journal
