= Barachak railway station =

Railway station in West Bengal, India

BARACHAK

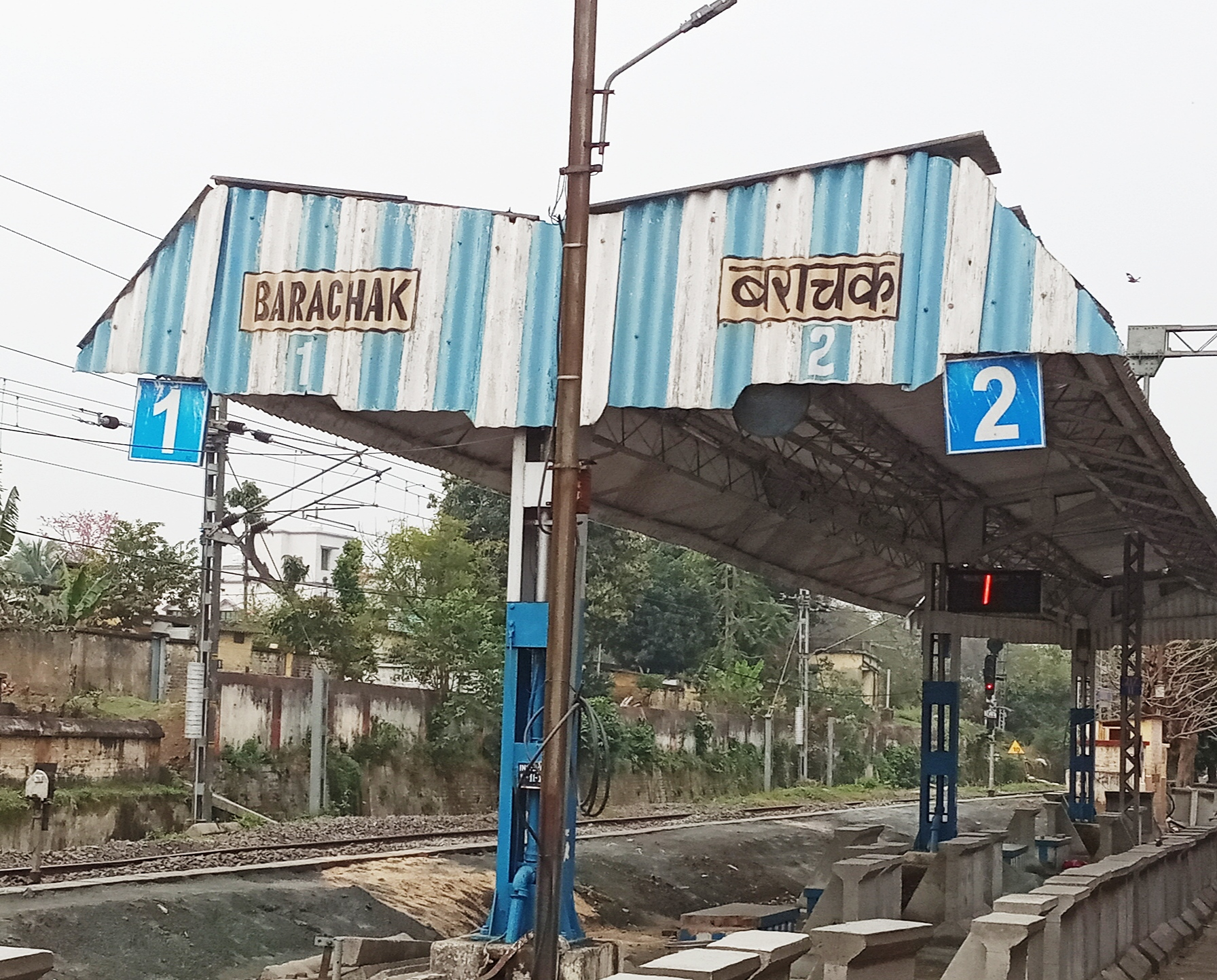
- Barachak railway station in 2020

General information
- Location: Barachak, Asansol, Paschim Bardhaman district, West Bengal; India
- Coordinates: 23°42′25″N 86°55′43″E
- Elevation: 127 m (417 ft)
- System: Indian Railways station
- Owner: Indian Railways
- Operator: Eastern Railway
- Lines: Howrah–Delhi main line Asansol–Patna section Howrah–Gaya–Delhi line Howrah–Allahabad–Mumbai line Grand Chord; Asansol–Gaya section
- Platforms: 3
- Tracks: 4

Construction
- Structure type: Standard on ground station
- Parking: Not available
- Cycle facilities: ?

Other information
- Status: Functioning
- Station code: BCQ
- Division(s): Asansol

History
- Opened: 1871
- Electrified: 1960–61
- Former names: East Indian Railway
Location
- Location within West Bengal Location within India

Barachak is a railway station in Asansol, Paschim Bardhaman district, West Bengal, India. This is a railway station between Asansol and Sitarampur railway stations.

== The railway station ==
Barachak railway station is located at an elevation of 127 m above sea level. It has been allotted the railway code – BCQ and is under the jurisdiction of Asansol railway division of Eastern Railway. It has 3 platforms.

== History ==
The East Indian Railway Company, extended the railway track that had been laid between Kolkata and Hooghly to Raniganj in 1855 and up to Asansol in July 1863. The initial route of the Howrah–Delhi main line was via what is now called the Sahibganj loop. The "shorter main line" was in position in 1871 with the completion of the Raniganj–Kiul section.

== Electrification ==
The Asansol–Sitarampur section, including Barachak-Hirapur Exchange Yard, was electrified in 1960–61.

== Mining industry ==
"The entire belt between Durgapur (158 km from Howrah), and all the way up to Dhanbad and beyond is industrialized. Apart from factories, there are many coalmines, some closed now, and some with fires burning deep in the mineshafts. The mining area extends for a large area, mostly to the south of the tracks. Quite a portion of the track passes through cuttings, where the surrounding area is higher than the track level, resulting in the profusion of characteristic small masonry bridges crossing the tracks." This description is from "Gomoh loco shed and CLW trip record" by Samit Roychoudhury.

Preceding station	Indian Railways	Following station
Asansol towards ?	Eastern Railway zone Asansol–Gaya section and Asansol–Patna section	Sitarampur towards ?
