= Baidyanathdham railway station =

Railway station in Jharkhand, India

BAIDYANATHDHAM DEOGHAR

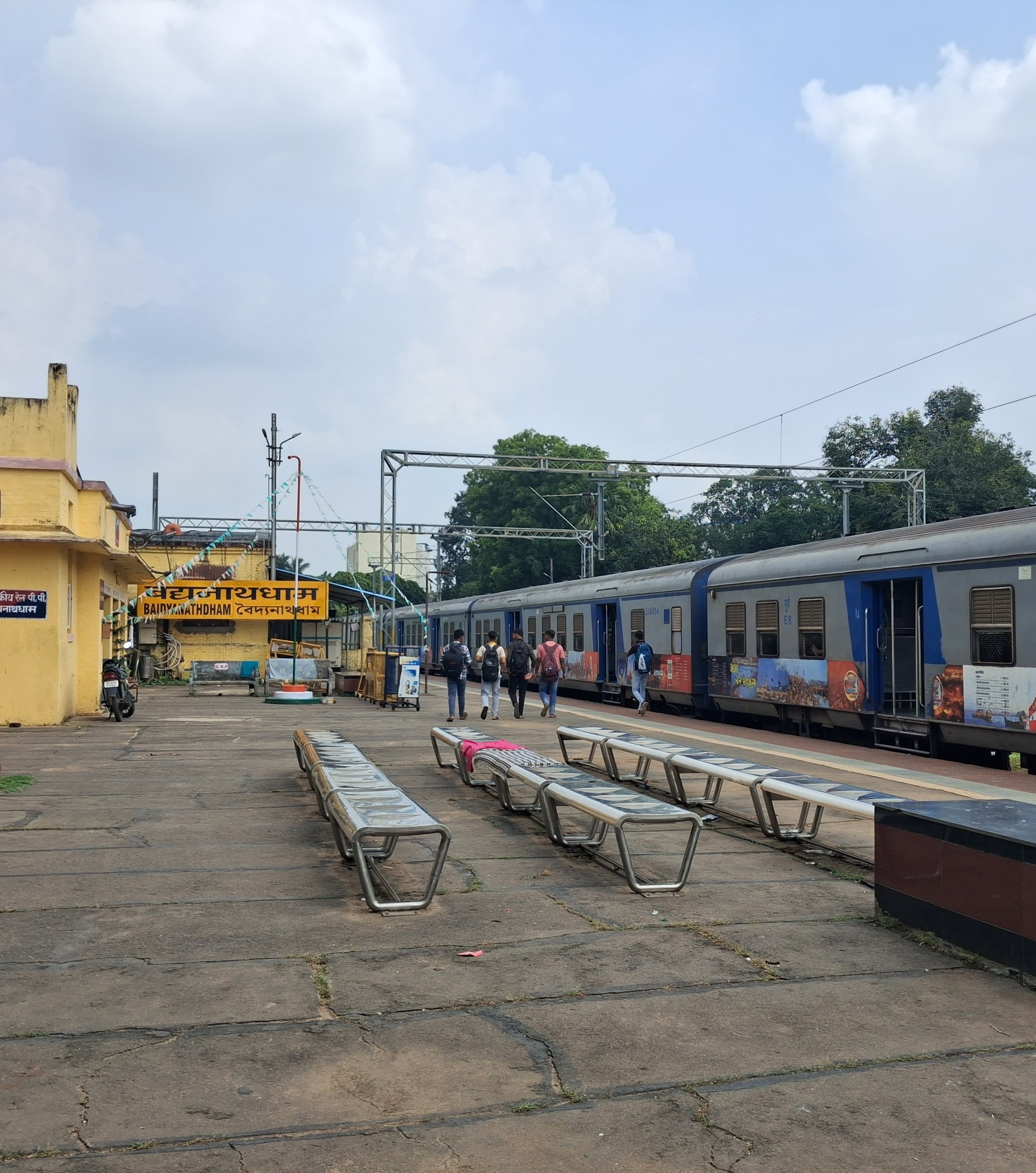
- Baidyanathdham railway station

General information
- Location: Baidyanathdham Railway Station Road, Deoghar, Jharkhand; India
- Coordinates: 24°29′21″N 86°41′32″E
- Elevation: 250 metres (820 ft)
- System: Indian Railways station
- Owner: Indian Railways
- Operator: Eastern Railway
- Line: Jasidih–Baidyanathdham branch line
- Platforms: 1
- Tracks: 3
- Connections: Terminal station

Construction
- Structure type: Standard (on ground station)
- Parking: No
- Cycle facilities: No
- Accessible: Available

Other information
- Status: Active
- Station code: BDME
- Zone(s): Eastern Railway
- Division(s): Asansol railway division
- Classification: NSG-5
Track layout
Location
- Location within Jharkhand
- Interactive map

Baidyanathdham railway station (station code: BDME) is a railway station in Deoghar district, in the Indian state of Jharkhand. The station serves the Baidyanathdham area of Deoghar and is the closest station for pilgrims visiting the Baidyanathdham Temple, one of the twelve Jyotirlingas of Lord Shiva. The station consists of one platform. The platform is well sheltered, and it has many facilities including water and sanitation.

== Station layout ==
G	Street Level	Exit/Entrance & Ticket Counter
P1	side platform (No. 1) – doors will open on the left/right
P1	Track 1	Jasidih ← toward
P1	Track 2
P1	Track 3

== Services ==
The Baidyanathdham Deoghar terminal station handles ten pairs of MEMU passenger trains running up to Jasidih, and two pair up to Asansol.

== See also ==
- Deoghar
- Deoghar Junction railway station
- Jasidih–Dumka–Rampurhat line
  - Jasidih Junction railway station
  - Dumka railway station
- List of railway stations in India
- Deoghar Airport
