= Deoghar Junction railway station =

Railway junction station in Jharkhand

Deoghar Junction
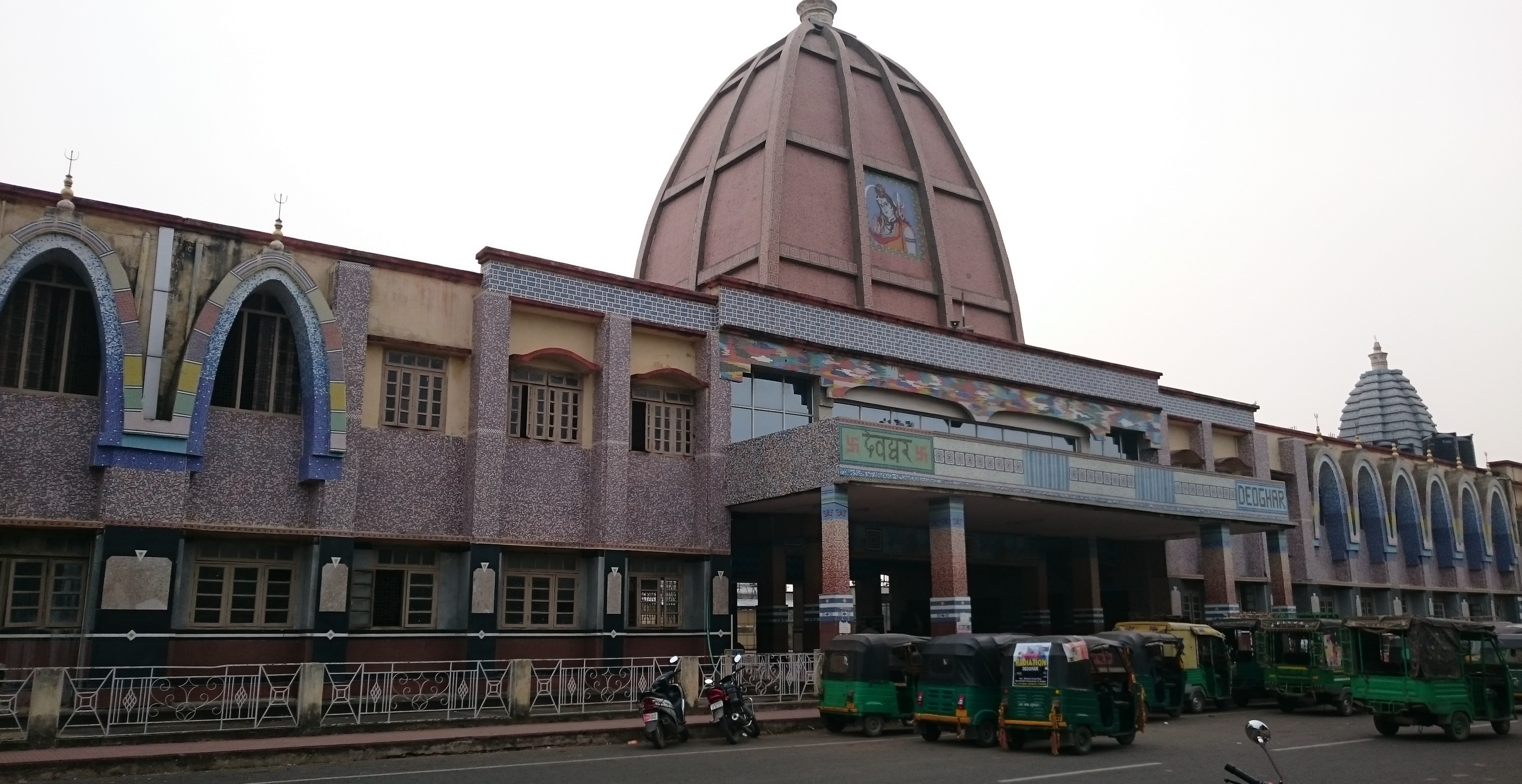
- Deoghar railway station building

General information
- Location: Deoghar, Jharkhand; India
- Coordinates: 24.5119976°N 86.6957309°E
- Elevation: 259 metres (850 ft)
- System: Indian Railways station
- Owner: Indian Railways
- Lines: Jasidih–Dumka–Rampurhat line Deoghar–Banka–Bhagalpur line Jasidih–Pirpainti line (under construction)
- Platforms: 3
- Tracks: 5 (electrified)
- Connections: Auto stand, Bus stand, Taxi stand

Construction
- Structure type: At-grade
- Parking: Yes
- Cycle facilities: No
- Accessible: Available

Other information
- Status: Active
- Station code: DGHR
- Zone(s): Eastern Railway
- Division(s): Asansol
- Classification: NSG-5

History
- Opened: 2011

Services
Preceding station	Indian Railways	Following station
Jasidih Junction towards Rampurhat Junction	Eastern Railway zone Jasidih–Dumka–Rampurhat line	Mohanpur towards Jasidih Junction
Track layout
- Station with three tracks, one side platform and one island platform
Location
- Location within Jharkhand
- Interactive map

Deoghar Junction Railway Station (station code: DGHR) is the railway station on the Jasidih–Dumka–Rampurhat line, serving the city of Deoghar in Deoghar district, Jharkhand.

== Further extension ==
The railways have proposed a Jasidih–bypass line after construction of which trains from Bhagalpur and Dumka can run up to Asansol and Dhanbad without loco reversal at Jasidih, also saving considerable time for the passengers. Deoghar is being developed as a major halt station to decongest Jasidih and avoid a delay of more than 30 minutes for an engine change at Jasidih.

The 97-kilometre (60 mi)-long Jasidih–Hansdiha–Pirpainti line is under construction. As of March 2021, work is under progress on Mohanpur–Hansdiha and Godda–Pirpainti sections. Hansdiha–Godda section has been completed and a proposal for Humsafar Express from Godda to New Delhi is under consideration. This line is considered important to connect the Godda district in the Santhal Pargana division of Jharkhand with the rest of India. The 80-kilometre (50 mi) Godda–Pakur line is also planned

== Facilities ==
The major facilities available at Deoghar station are waiting rooms, computerised reservation facility, reservation counter and vehicle parking.

=== Platforms ===
There are a total of 3 platforms and 5 tracks. The platforms are connected by foot overbridge. These platforms are built to accumulate 24 coaches express train. The platforms are equipped with modern facility like display board of arrival and departure of trains.

=== Station layout ===
G	Street level	Exit/Entrance & ticket counter
P1	FOB, Side platform, No-1 doors will open on the left/right
P1	Track 1
P1	Track 2
P1	FOB, Island platform, No- 2 doors will open on the left/right
P1	Island platform, No- 3 doors will open on the left/right
P1	Track 3

== Major trains ==
Multiple passenger trains connect Deoghar Junction to Dumka, Banka, Jamalpur and Rampurhat. Other important trains that run via Deoghar are :

- Dumka–Ranchi Intercity Express
- Dibrugarh - Deogarh Express
- Ranchi–Godda Intercity Express
- Deoghar–Agartala Weekly Express

== Gallery ==
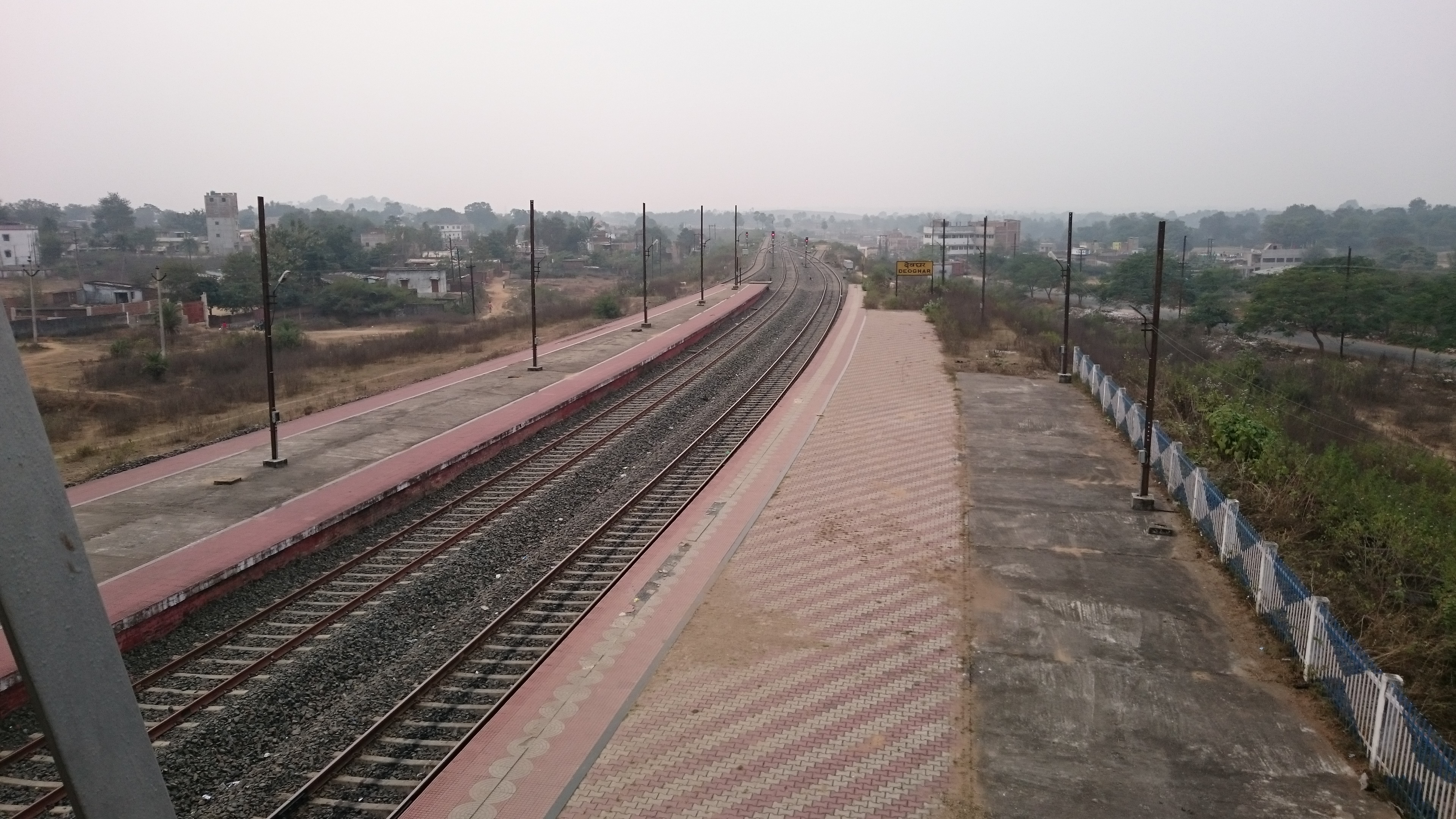
Deoghar railway station platform

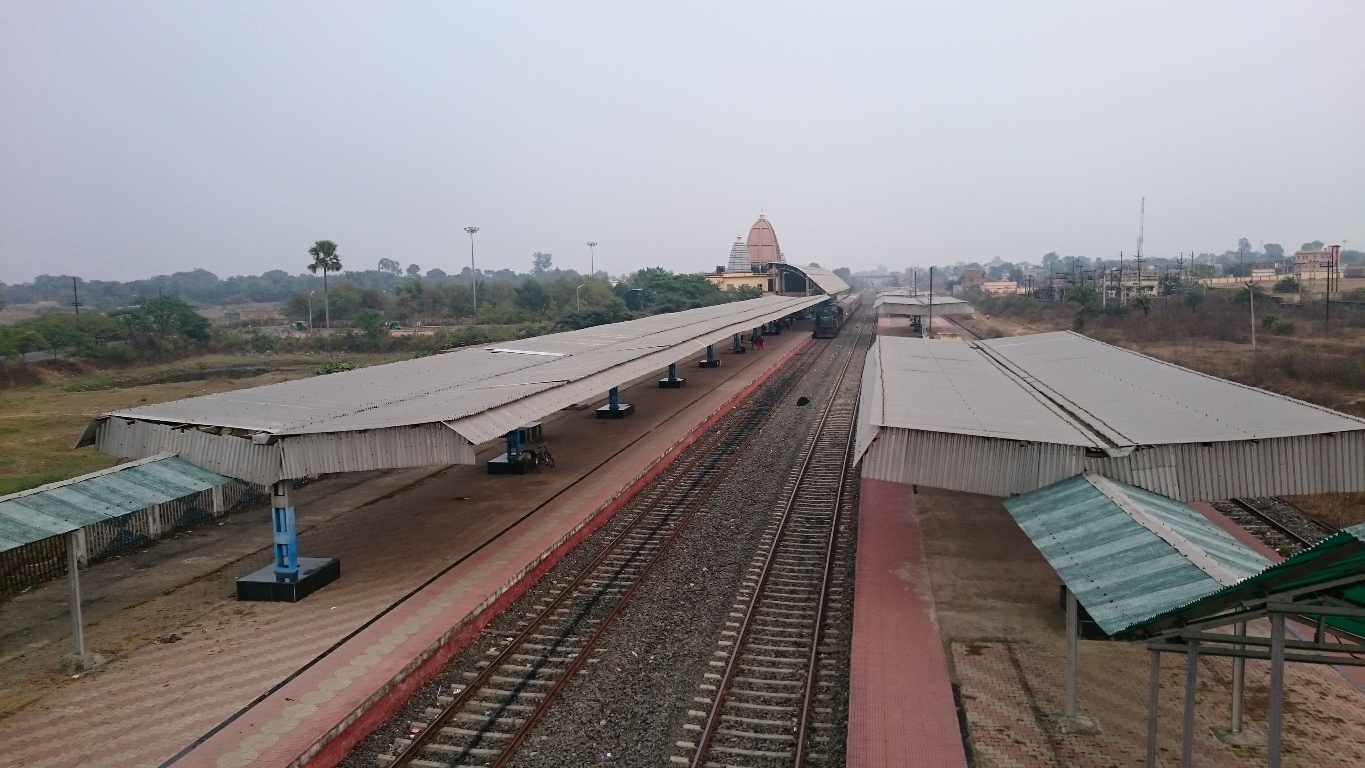
Deoghar railway station platform view

== See also ==
- Deoghar
- Indian Railways
- Jasidih Junction
- Jasidih–Dumka–Rampurhat line
- Baidyanathdham Deoghar
- List of railway stations in India
