= Barmasia railway station =

Railway station in Jharkhand, India

Barmasia Station
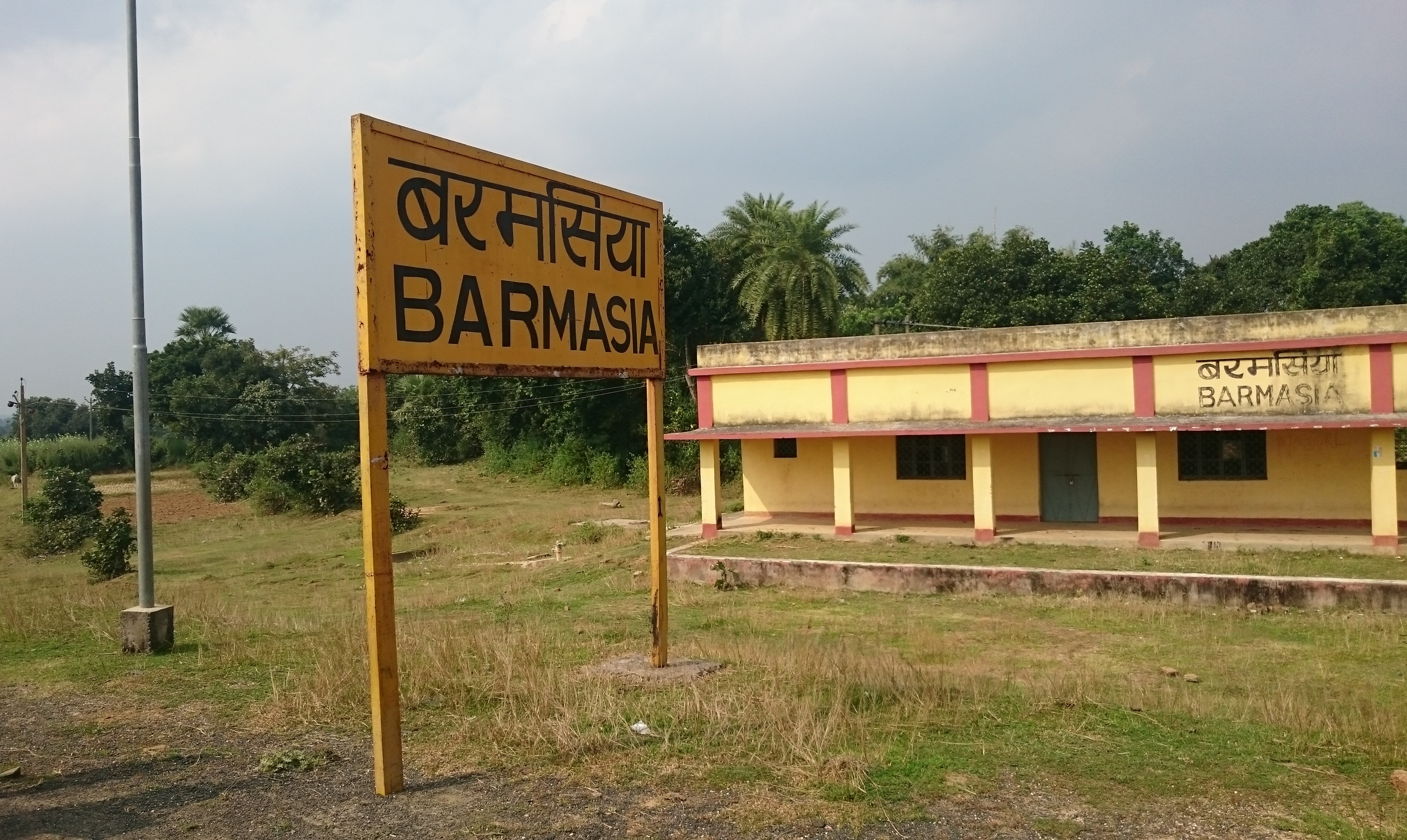
- Barmasia station building

General information
- Location: Barmasia, Dumka district, Jharkhand 814119; India
- Coordinates: 24.2244927°N 87.3877729°E
- Elevation: 158 metres (518 ft)
- System: Indian Railways station
- Owner: Indian Railways
- Operator: Eastern Railway zone
- Line: Jasidih–Dumka–Rampurhat line
- Platforms: Side platform 1
- Tracks: 1
- Connections: Rampurhat, Dumka

Construction
- Structure type: At ground, Single-track railway
- Parking: Available

Other information
- Status: Functional
- Station code: BRMA
- Zone(s): Eastern Railway
- Division(s): Howrah

History
- Opened: 2014
- Electrified: 2021

Services
Preceding station	Indian Railways	Following station
Kurwa towards Rampurhat Junction	Eastern Railway zone Jasidih–Dumka–Rampurhat line	Ambajora Shikaripara towards Jasidih Junction
Location
- Location within Jharkhand

Barmasia railway station (station code BRMA) is at Barmasia village in Dumka district in the Indian state of Jharkhand on the Jasidih – Rampurhat section. It is in the Howrah Division of the Eastern Railway zone of the Indian Railways. It has an average elevation of 158 metres (518 ft).

The railway line has single 5 ft 6 in (1,676 mm) broad gauge track from Jasidih Junction in Deoghar district in Santhal Pargana division of Jharkhand to Rampurhat in Birbhum district of West Bengal. This railway track to Dumka is a boon for Santhal Pargana Division.

The Barmasia railway station offers rail connectivity to the nearby villages of Gopalpur, Syampur, Bucham, Kuspahari, and Patabari.

== History ==
Barmasia railway station became operation in 2014. The 64 km (40 mi) segment from Dumka to Rampurhat became operational on 30 June 2014.

== Station layout ==
G	Street level	Exit/Entrance & ticket counter
P1	Side platform, No-1 doors will open on the left/right
P1	Track 1	Rampurhat ← toward → Jasidih

== Trains ==
One passenger train runs between Jasidih Junction and Rampurhat stop at Barmasia railway station.

== See also ==
- Dumka
- Indian Railways
- Dumka
- Jasidih Junction
- Jasidih–Dumka–Rampurhat line
- Rampurhat Junction
- List of railway stations in India
- Shikaripara
