= Asansol Junction railway station =

Railway station in West Bengal, India

ASANSOL JUNCTION

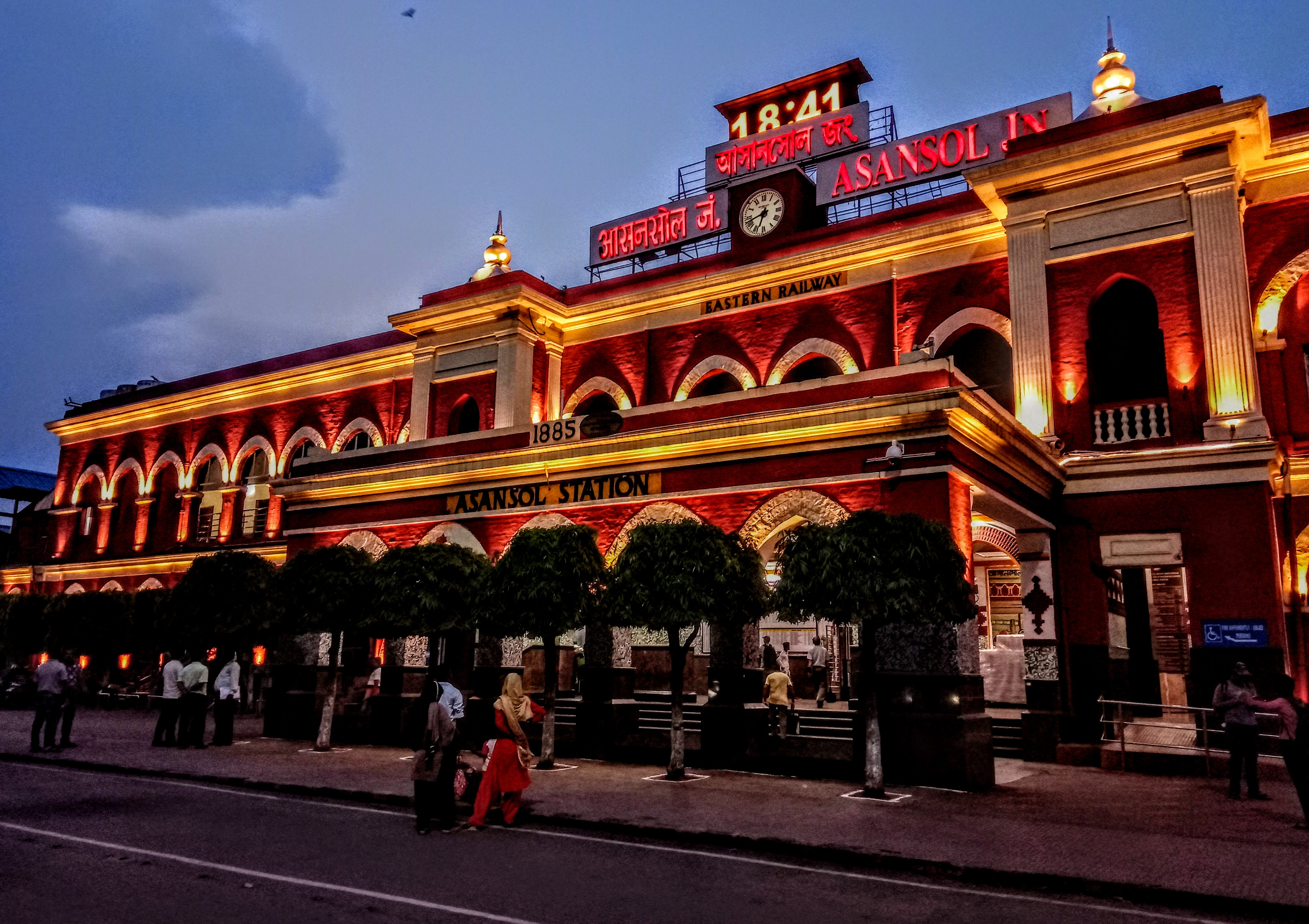
- Entrance view of Asansol Junction railway station

General information
- Location: Station Road, Asansol, Paschim Bardhaman district, West Bengal; India
- Coordinates: 23°41′29″N 86°58′29″E
- Elevation: 96 metres (315 ft)
- System: Indian Railways station
- Owner: Indian Railways
- Operator: Eastern Railways
- Lines: Bardhaman–Asansol section, Asansol–Patna section, New Delhi–Howrah main line, Asansol–Gaya section, New Delhi–Gaya–Howrah line, Asansol–Tatanagar–Kharagpur line
- Platforms: 7 platforms Length– 620 m (2,030 ft)
- Tracks: 11
- Connections: Auto stand, bus stand, cab zone

Construction
- Structure type: At grade
- Parking: Available
- Cycle facilities: Available
- Accessible: Disabled access

Other information
- Status: Active
- Station code: ASN
- Zone(s): Eastern Railway
- Division(s): Asansol
- Classification: NSG-2
- Website: www.irctc.co.in/nget/train-search

History
- Opened: 1864; 162 years ago
- Electrified: 1957–1962
- Former names: East Indian Railway
Services
Preceding station	Indian Railways	Following station
Kalipahari towards Howrah Junction	Eastern Railway zone Howrah–Delhi main line	Barachak towards New Delhi
Terminus	South Eastern Railway zone Asansol–Tatanagar–Kharagpur line	Burnpur towards Kharagpur Junction
Route map
Location
- Location within India Location within West Bengal
- Interactive map of Asansol Junction

Asansol Junction (station code: ASN) is a railway station of Eastern Railway in Asansol of Paschim Bardhaman district in the Indian state of West Bengal. The station is on the Howrah–Delhi main line. It is the 8th busiest railway station in India in terms of frequency of trains after Kanpur Central, Vijayawada Junction, Delhi Junction, New Delhi, Ambala Cant, Howrah and Patna Junction. Around 171 trains pass through the station daily. It serves Asansol and the surrounding areas.

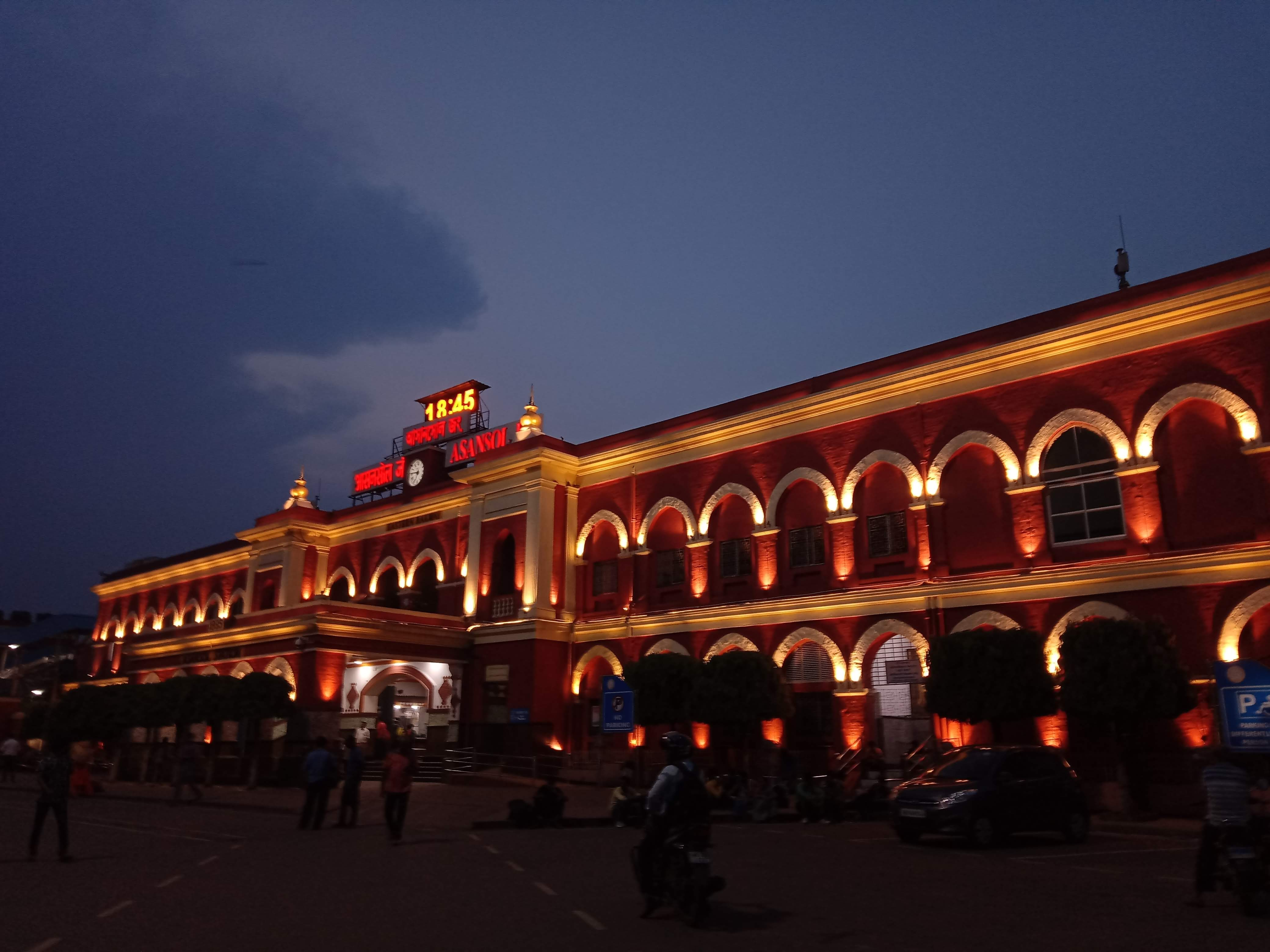
View of Asansol railway junction

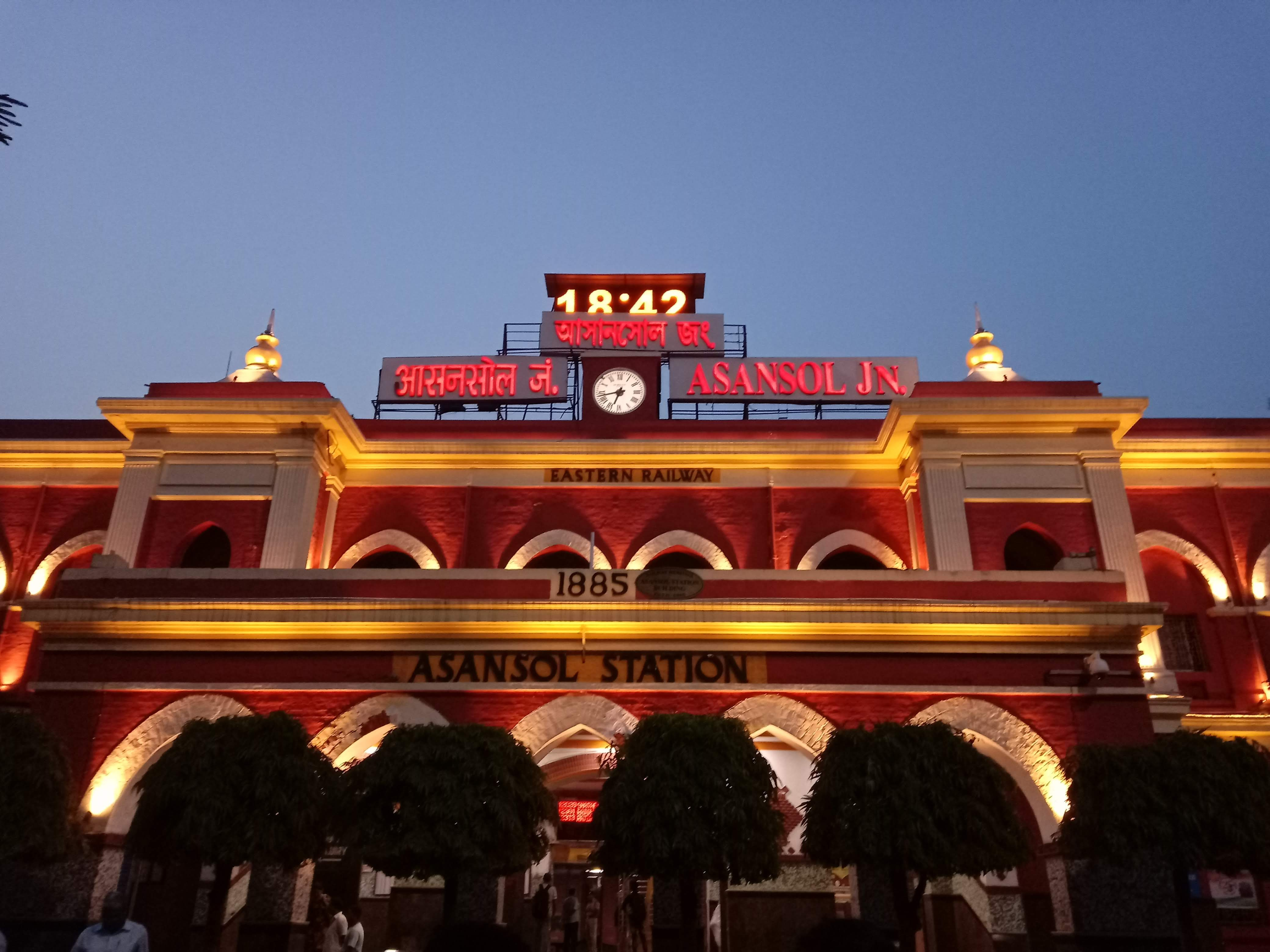
Entrance gate of Asansol Railway Junction

== Overview ==
=== Mining-industry zone ===
"The entire belt between Durgapur (158 km from Howrah), and all the way up to Dhanbad and beyond is industrialized. Apart from factories, there are many coalmines, some closed now, and some with fires burning deep in the mineshafts. Mining area extends for a large area, mostly to the south of the tracks. Quite a portion of the track passes through cuttings, where the surrounding area is higher than the track level, resulting in the profusion of characteristic small masonry bridges crossing the tracks." This description is from "Gomoh loco shed and CLW trip record" by Samit Roychoudhury.

== History ==
During the middle of the nineteenth century, Carr, Tagore and Company transported coal from Narayankuri ghat on the Damodar River to Kolkata, then known as Calcutta. However, as the flow of water in the river was inconsistent, supplies were irregular. In order to capture the lucrative coal transport business, East Indian Railway, extended the railway track that had been laid between Kolkata and Hooghly to Raniganj in 1855 and up to Asansol in July 1863.

A

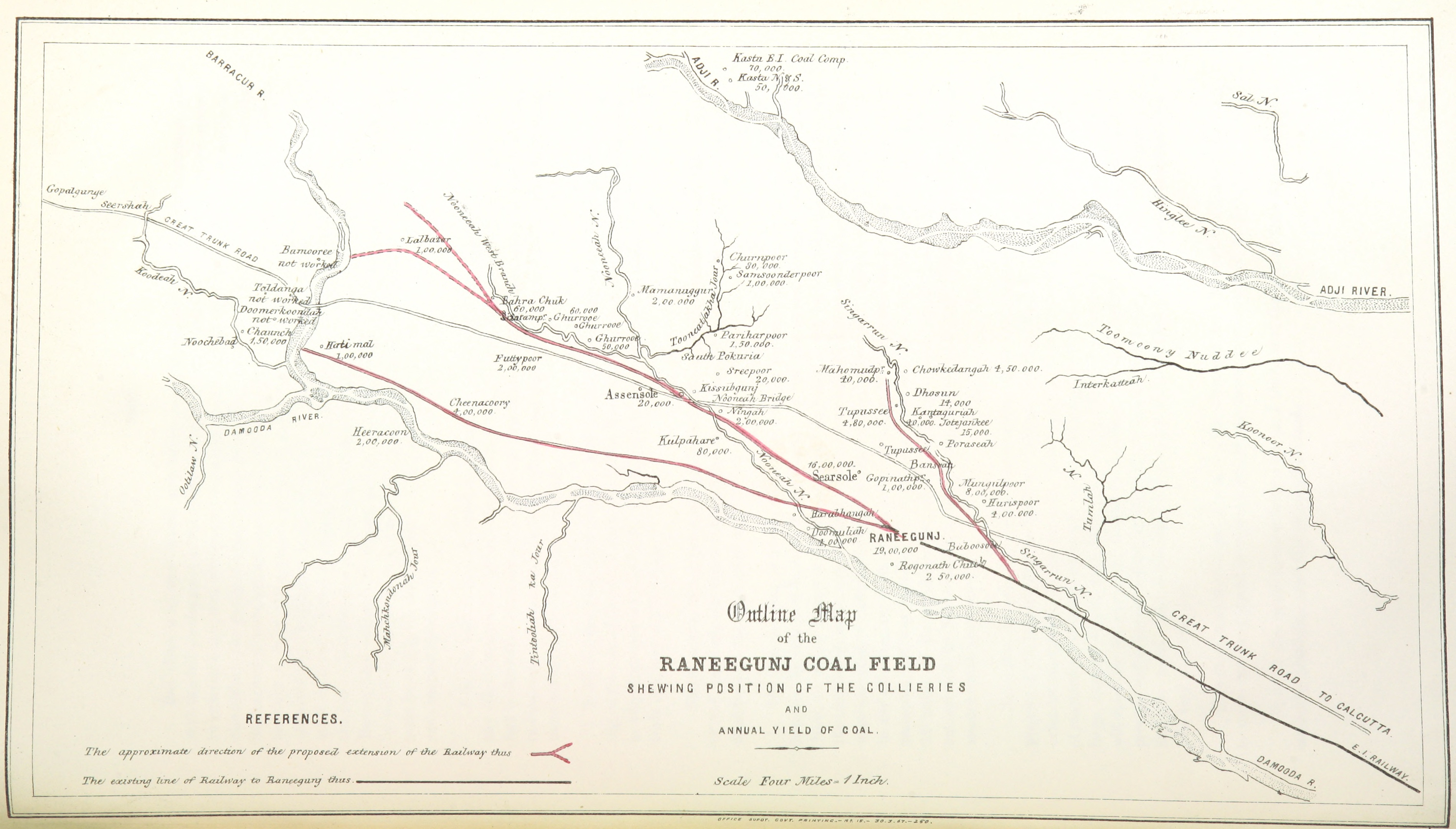

The East Indian Railway needed land to develop the infrastructure for the railways. While the Searsol Raj, then the zamindar in the Raniganj area, refused to provide the land, the Panchakot Raj, then functioning from Kashipur, agreed to provide the land in Shergarh, of which Asansol was then a part in 1863–64, East Indian Railway purchased a large area of jungle land from the Panchakot Raj, thereby initiating the development of Asansol as an industrial area.

Subsequently, Asansol gained further in importance. What was later known as the Sahibganj loop was the first line from Kolkata to Delhi and the first direct train started in 1866, but the shorter line via Asansol and Jhajha came up in 1871. It was initially called the Chord line but as it attracted more traffic, was rechristened the main line and the earlier main line became Sahibganj loop. With the completion of the Sitarampur–Gaya–Mughalsarai Grand Chord in 1901 (formally inaugurated in 1906 and finally opened in 1907), the Kolkata–Delhi rail distance became even shorter, and Asansol started functioning as the junction station of the main and chord lines, as Sitarampur, the actual junction, near Asansol, is a comparatively smaller station.

While momentous developments were taking place in connecting Delhi and Kolkata by rail, Bengal Nagpur Railway extended its tracks to the Asansol coal belt in 1887, thus connecting Adra with Asansol.

The railway establishment at Asansol contributed substantially to its development and growth.

== Electrification ==
Electrification of the railways gained momentum in the early fifties. Although initial installations were with 3 kV DC traction, the railways subsequently adopted the 25 kV AC system. Electrification of the Bardhaman–Mughalsarai section was completed in 1957 and the Howrah–Gaya stretch was electrified by around 1960. The Tatanagar–Adra–Asansol section was electrified in the 1957–1962 period.

== Locomotive shed ==
Asansol Electric Loco Shed is home to the oldest electric locomotive shed of Indian Railways. It houses WAP-4, WAG-5, WAM-4 and WAG-7.

== Asansol Division ==
Established in 1925, Asansol Division is one of the oldest divisions of Indian Railways. On the Howrah–Delhi main line, its jurisdiction extends from the distant signal of Khana junction to the distant signal of Jhajha . On the Grand Chord line its jurisdiction extends up to the distant signal of Pradhankhunta. Branch lines under its jurisdiction are: Andal–Sainthia, Andal–Tapasi–Barabani–Sitarampur, Madhupur–Giridih, Jasidih–Baidyanathdham and Jasidih–Dumka. With a total of 565 route kilometers, the division has quadruple lines (two up and two down line) from Khana to Sitarampur. It handles 100 mail/express trains daily and 212 passenger train runs per day. The number of originating passengers per day is 144,070.

== Passenger movement ==
Asansol is amongst the top hundred booking stations of Indian Railway. 228 trains (including weeklies and bi-weeklies) originate or pass through Asansol railway station. All trains including Sealdah Rajdhani, Howrah Rajdhani, Howrah Duronto, Sealdah Humsafar Express and Shalimar Duronto stops at Asansol Junction except 12259/60 Sealdah - Bikaner Duronto Express and 12305/06 Howrah - New Delhi Rajdhani Express. Halt of 12301/02 Howrah - New Delhi Rajdhani Express was provided at Asansol Jn on request of politician Babul Supriyo in May 2018.

== Amenities ==
Asansol railway station has three double-bedded AC retiring rooms, two double-bedded non-AC retiring rooms and an eight-bedded dormitory. Escalators are present at platforms no. 2 and 7. WiFi service is available here. A food plaza in the station premises is open 24/7. It also has an air-conditioned premium lounge for upscale passengers.

== Gallery ==
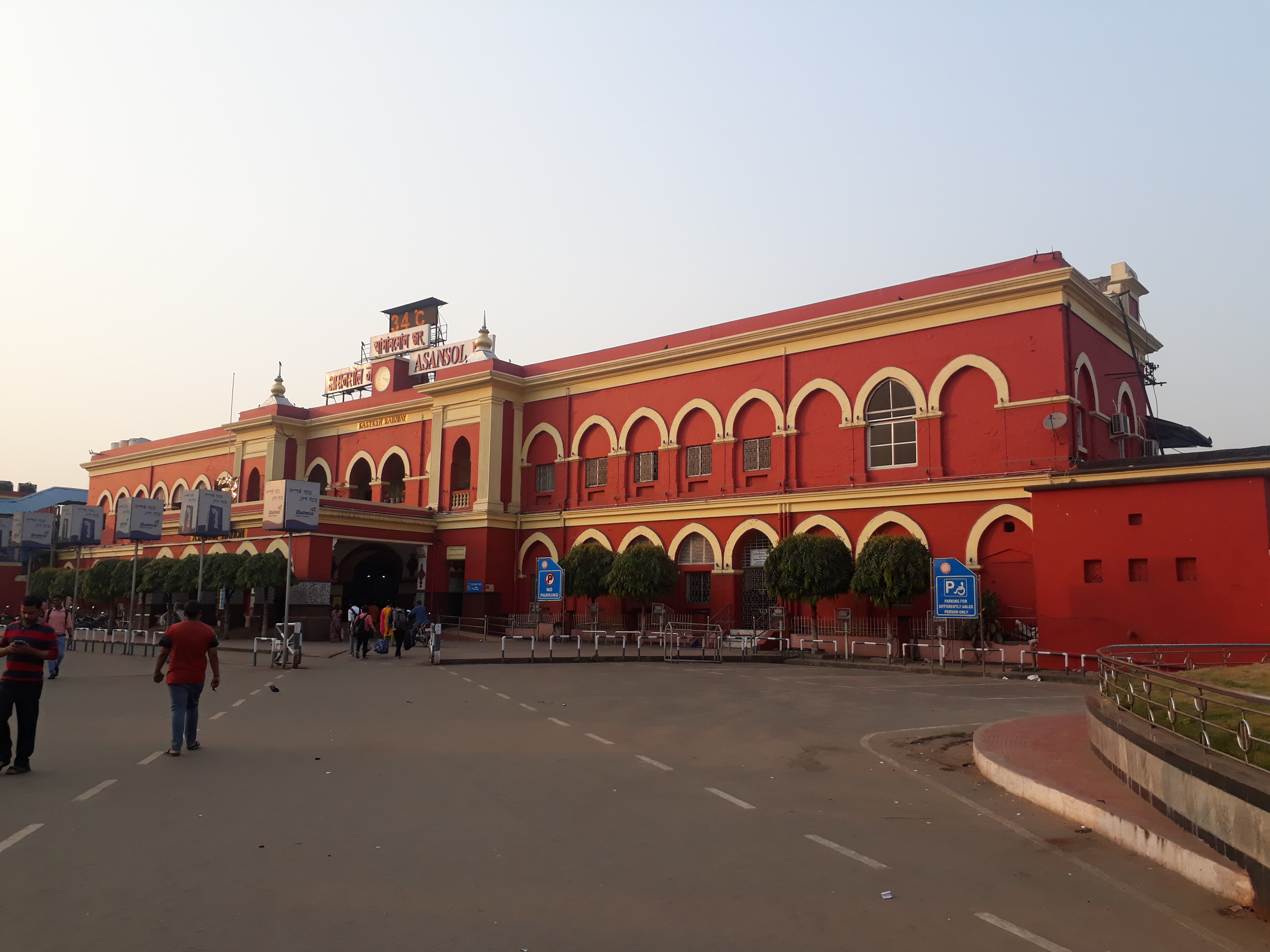
Asansol railway station building

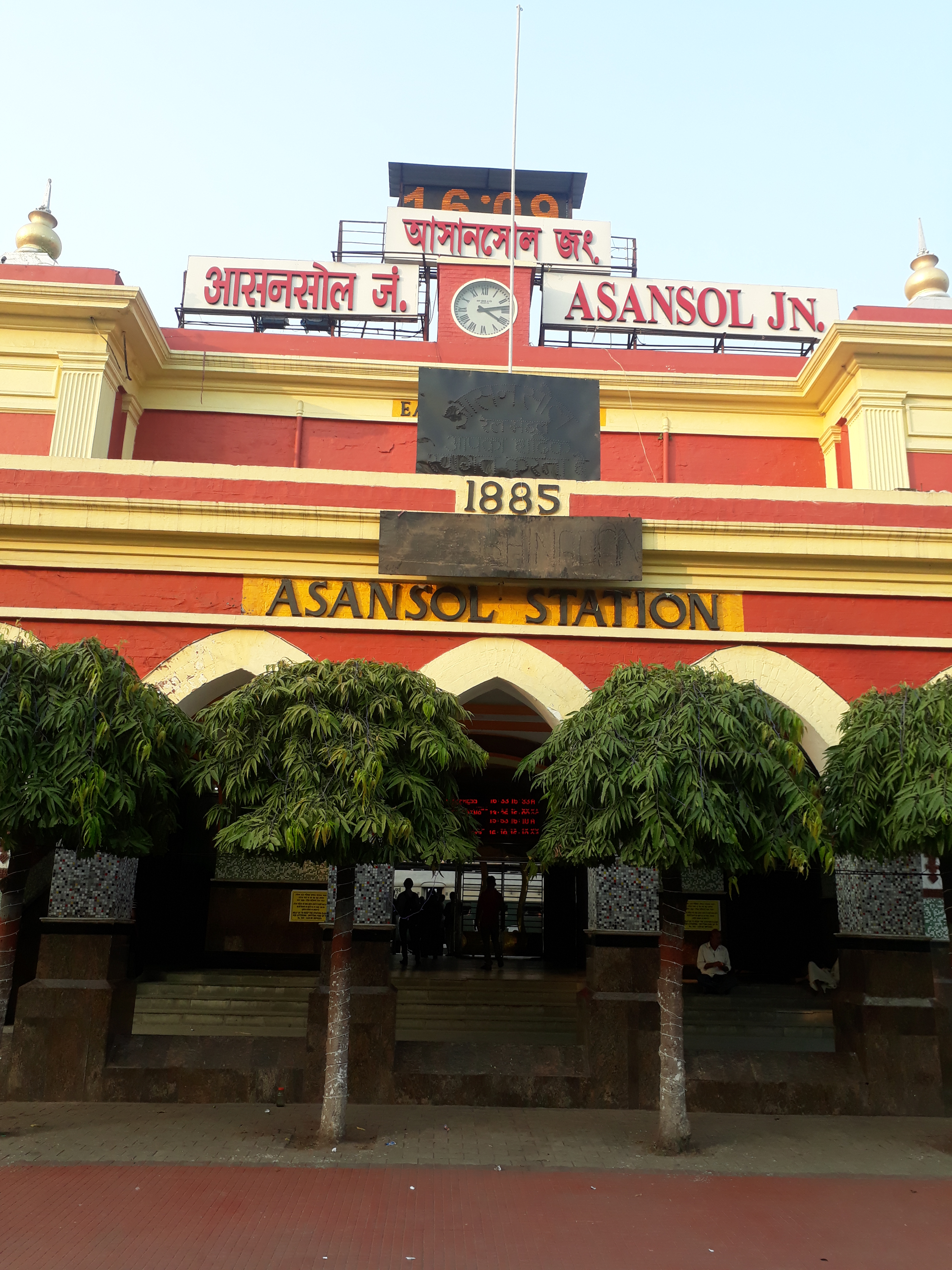
Asansol railway station, Bardhaman

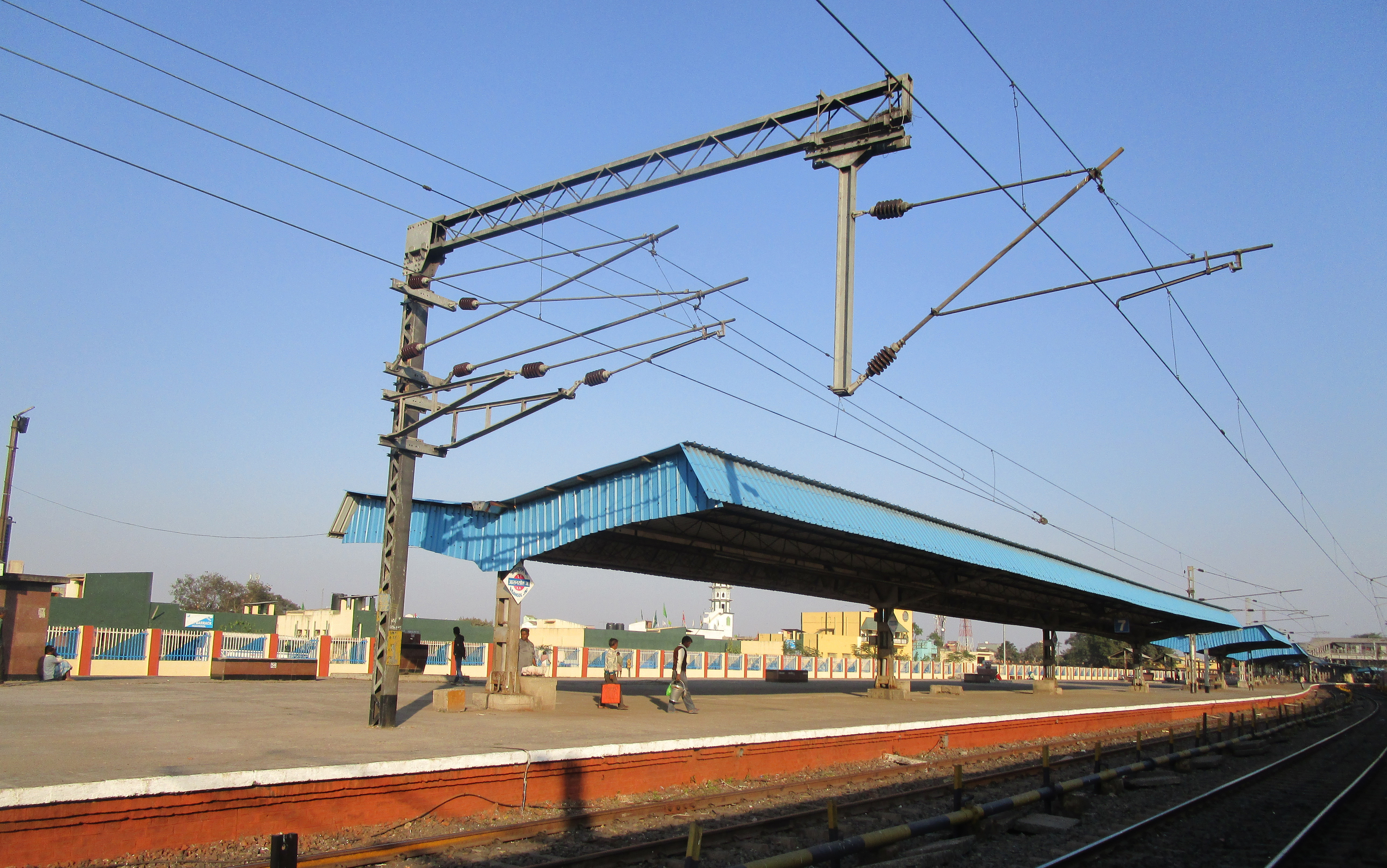
Station platform

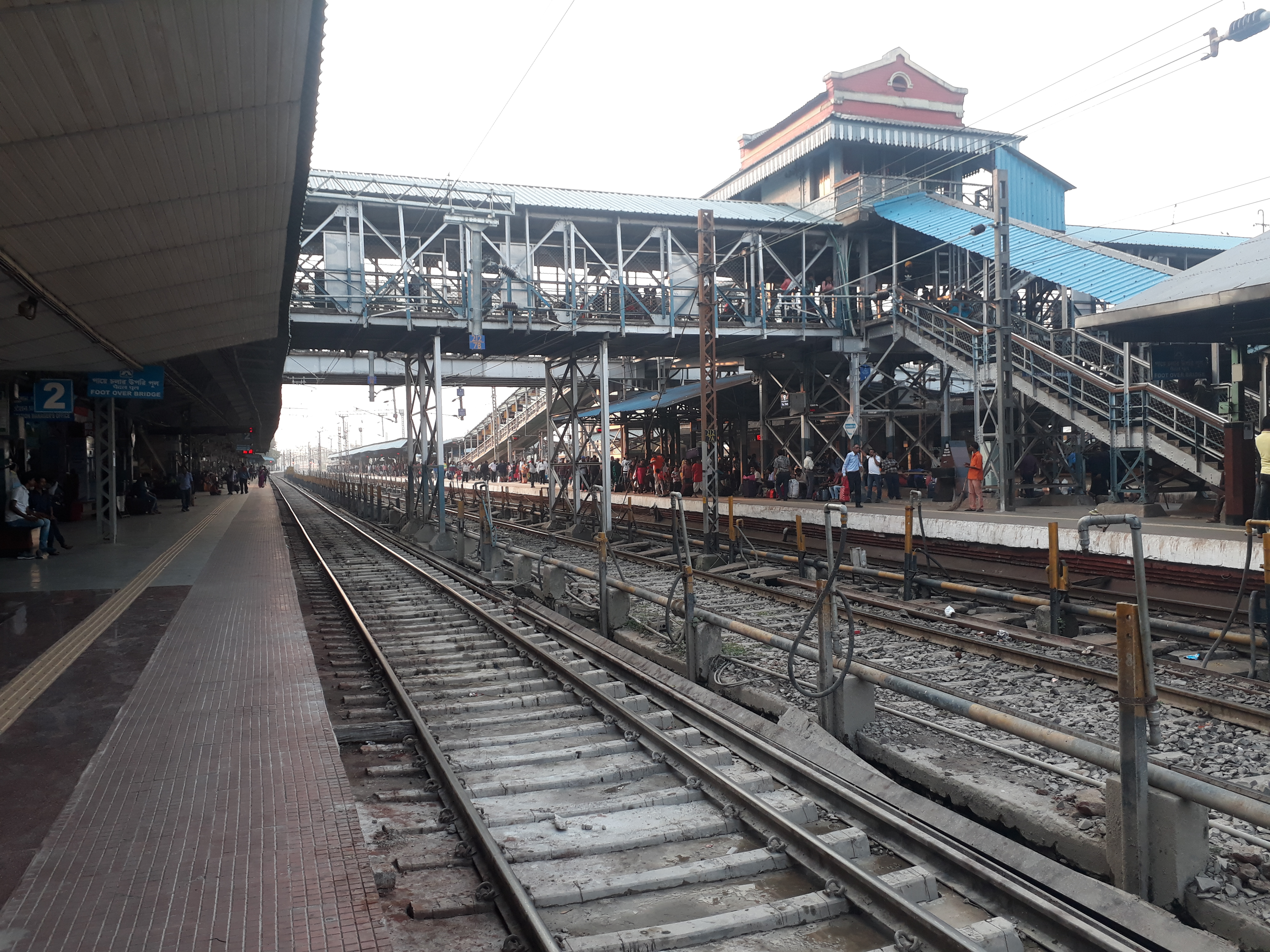
Asansol Junction railway station platform

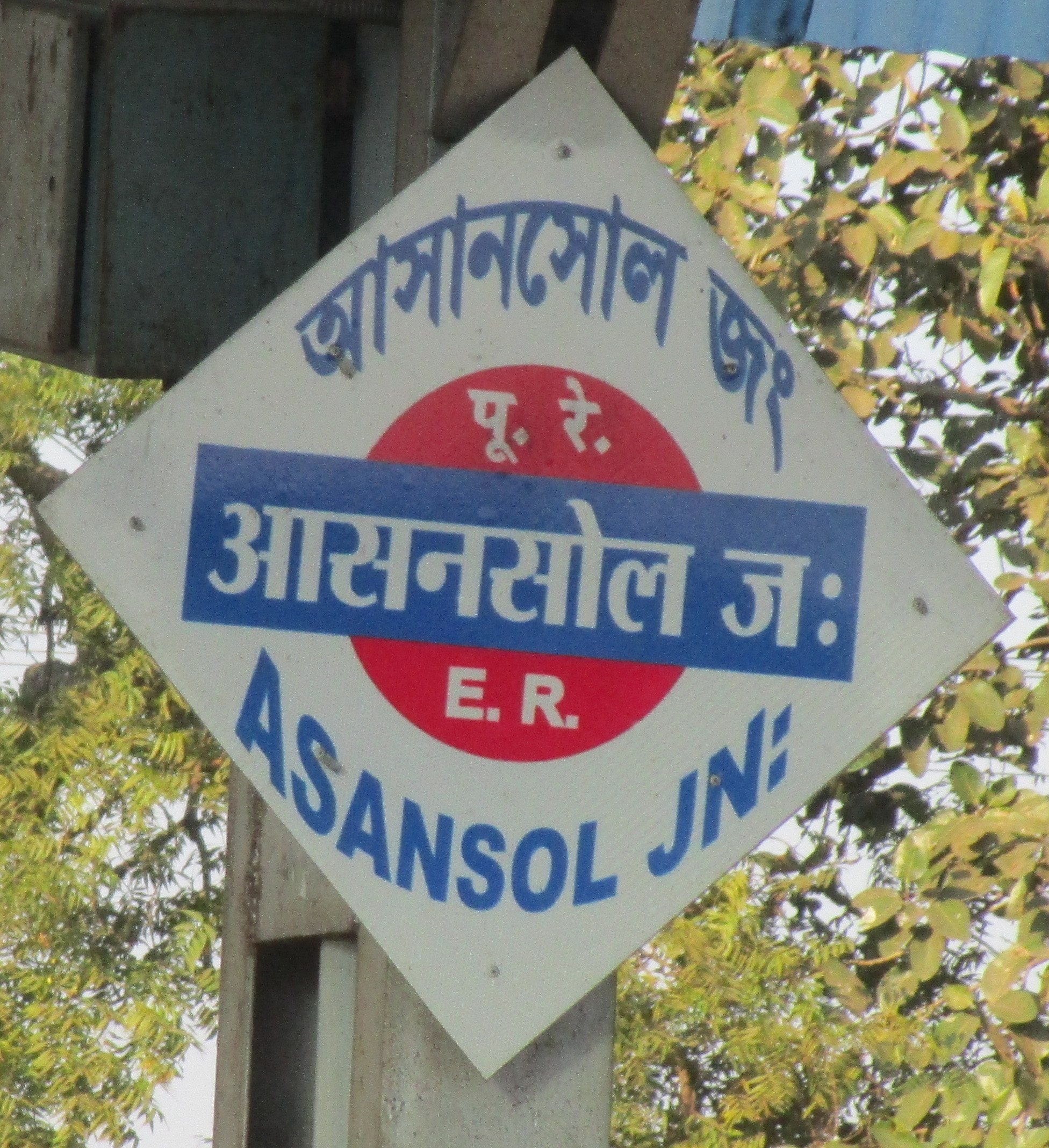
Station platform board

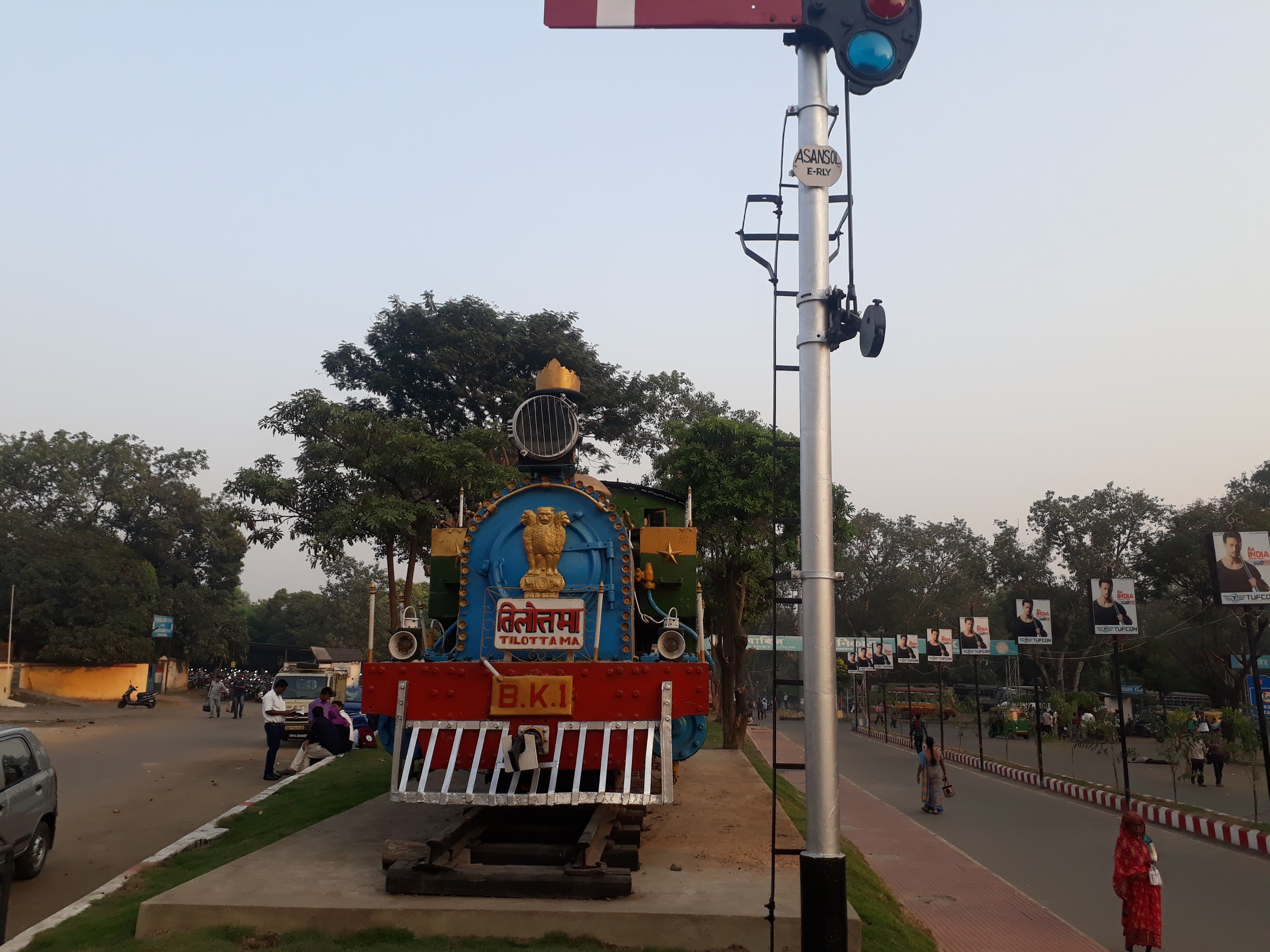
a model railway station in Asansol, Paschim Bardhaman district in the Indian state of West Bengal

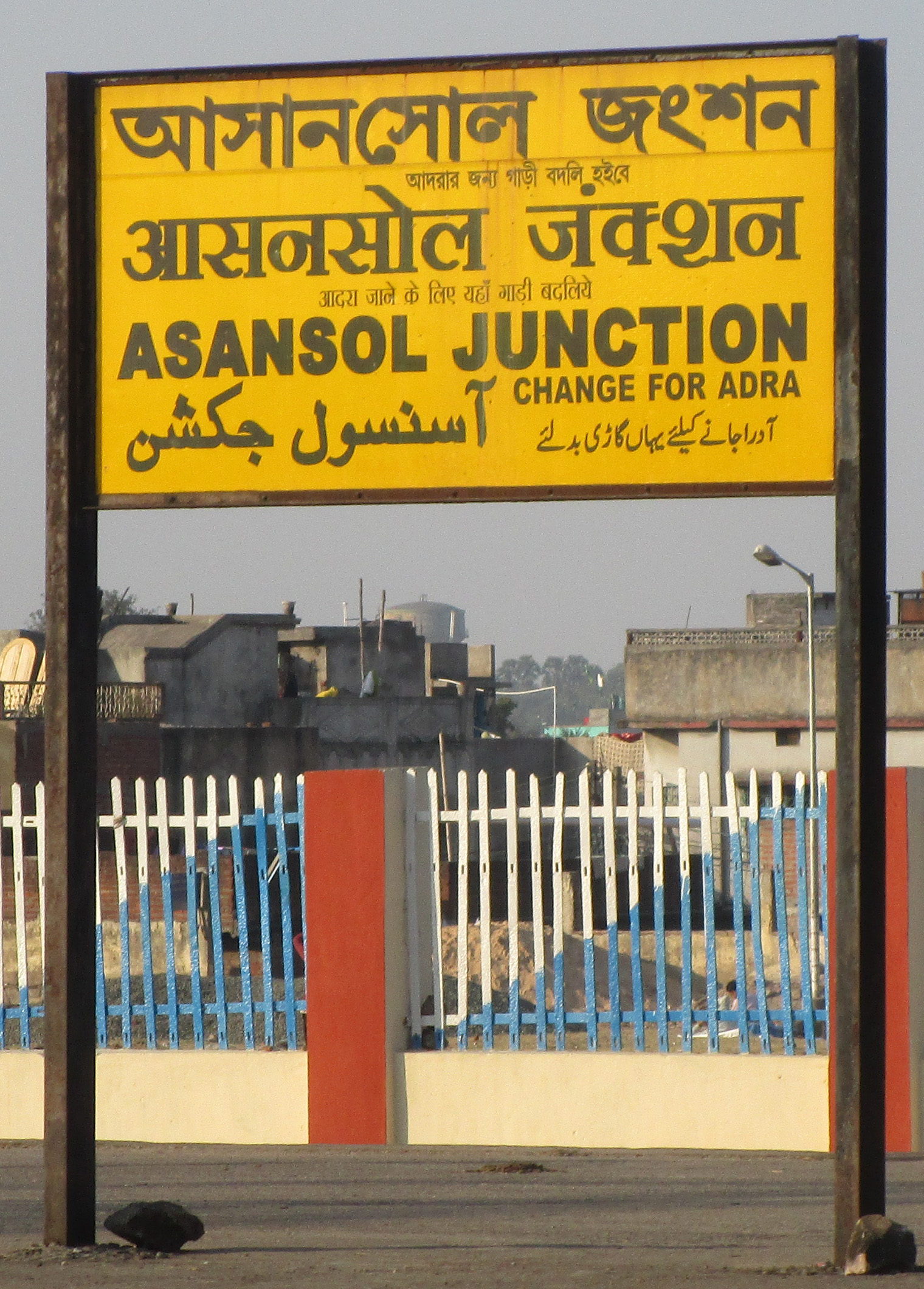
Asansol railway station nameplate

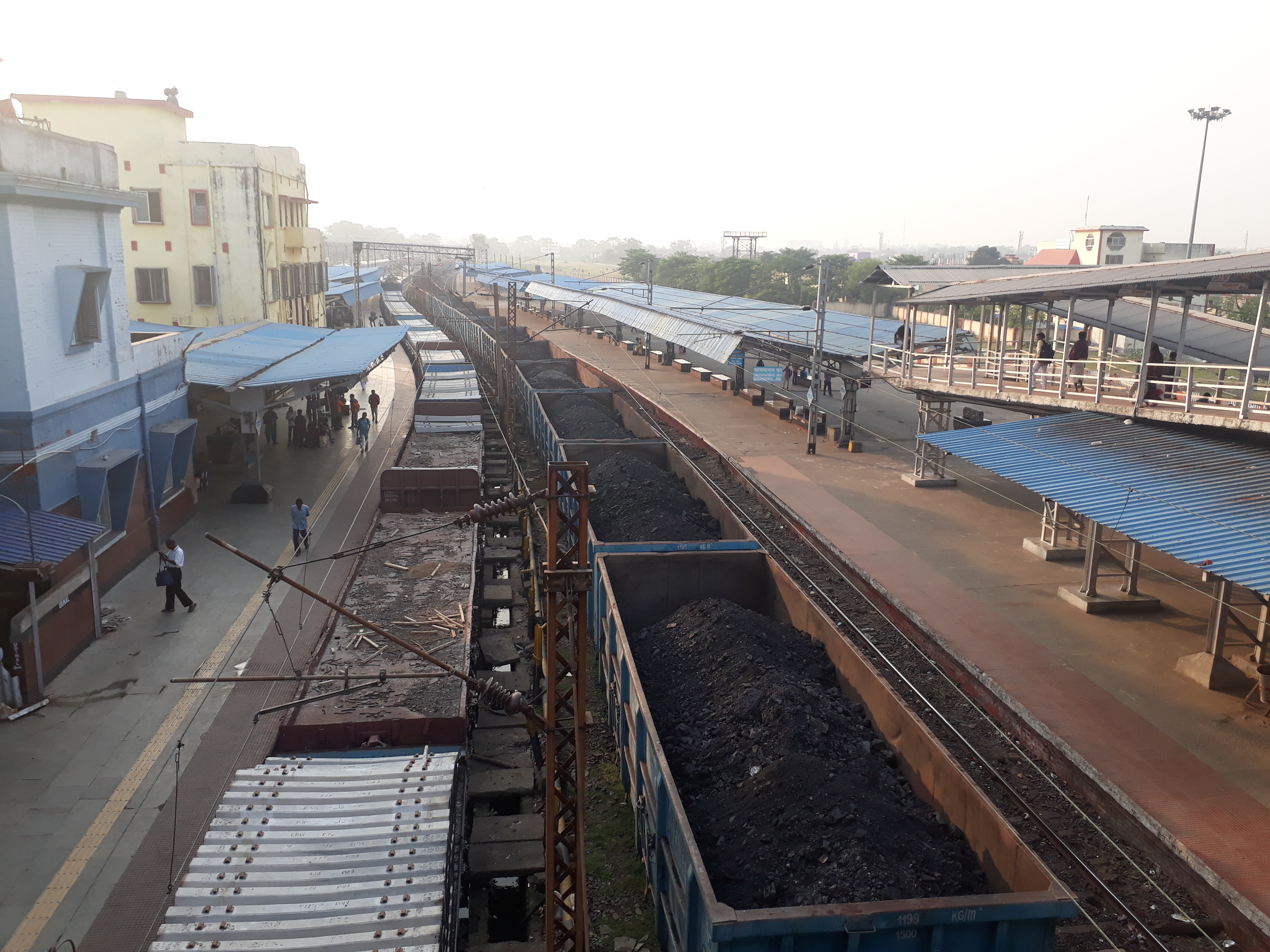
Asansol railway station, over-bridge view
