= Jasidih–Baidyanathdham branch line =

Railway route in India

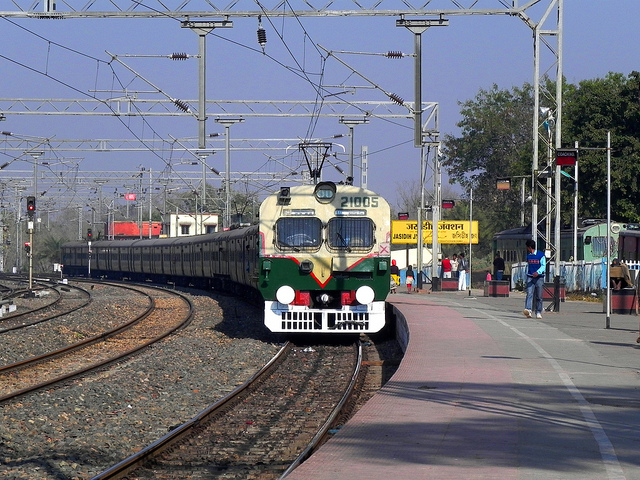
- Jasidih, an important railway station on Jasidih–Baidyanathdham branch line

Overview
- Status: Operational
- Owner: Indian Railways
- Locale: Jharkhand
- Termini: Jasidih Junction (JSME); Baidyanathdham (BDME)
- Stations: 3

Service
- Type: Electrified
- System: Broad gauge
- Services: Jasidih–Baidyanathdham branch line
- Operator: Eastern Railway

Technical
- Line length: 6.25 km (3.88 mi)
- Number of tracks: 1
- Track gauge: 5 ft 6 in (1,676 mm) Indian gauge
- Electrification: Yes
- Operating speed: 30–50 km/h (20–30 mph)

The Jasidih–Baidyanathdham branch line is a 6.25 km (3.88 mi) long single-track Indian gauge railway line connecting Jasidih Junction to Baidyanathdham railway station in Deoghar district of Jharkhand, India. The line primarily provides rail access to the pilgrimage centre of the Baidyanath Jyotirlinga Temple. It is administered by the Asansol railway division of the Eastern Railway zone of Indian Railways.
