= Sitarampur Junction railway station =

Railway station in West Bengal, India

SITARAMPUR JUNCTION

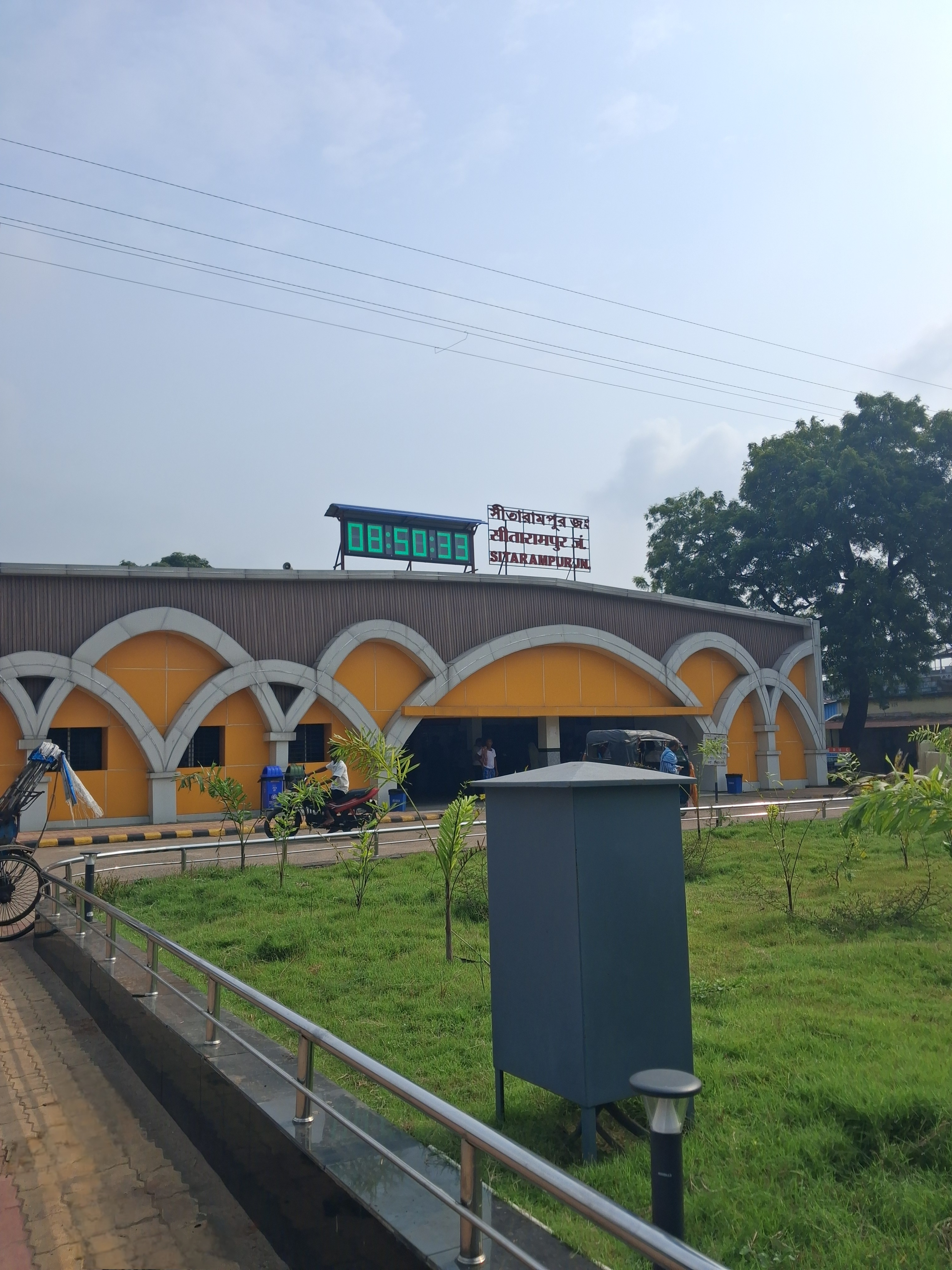
- Sitarampur railway station nameplate

General information
- Location: Sitarampur, Asansol, Paschim Bardhaman district, West Bengal; India
- Coordinates: 23°43′24″N 86°53′48″E
- Elevation: 99 metres (325 ft)
- System: Indian Railways junction station
- Lines: New Delhi–Howrah main line, Asansol–Patna section, New Delhi–Gaya–Howrah line, Howrah–Prayagraj–Mumbai line, Asansol–Gaya section
- Platforms: 5
- Tracks: Quadruple Electric-Line

Construction
- Parking: Available

Other information
- Status: Functional
- Station code: STN
- Zone(s): Eastern Railway
- Division(s): Asansol Division

History
- Electrified: 1960–1961
Location
- Location within West Bengal Location within India
- Interactive map

Sitarampur Junction (station code: STN) is the railway station serving the neighbourhood of Neamatpur and Sitarampur in Asansol, Paschim Bardhaman district in the Indian state of West Bengal. Sitarampur Junction is part of the Asansol Division of the Eastern Railway zone of the Indian Railways. Sitarampur Junction is connected to metropolitan areas of India, Delhi–Kolkata main line via the Mugalsarai–Patna route as well as the Grand Chord route. It has an average elevation of 99 metres (325 ft).

== Overview ==
=== Mining-industry zone ===
"The entire belt between Durgapur (158 km (98 mi) from Howrah), and all the way up to Dhanbad and beyond is industrialized. Apart from factories, there are many coal mines, some closed now, and some with fires burning deep in the mineshafts. The mining area extends for a large area, mostly to the south of the tracks. Quite a portion of the track passes through cuttings, where the surrounding area is higher than the track level, resulting in the profusion of characteristic small masonry bridges crossing the tracks." This description is from "Gomoh loco shed and CLW trip record" by Samit Roychoudhury.

== History ==
As the movement of coal by trains increased considerably a new railway line, the Grand Chord, was laid from Sitarampur to Mughalsarai. At that time, Sitarampur boasted the largest steam locomotive shed and the second largest coal moving yard in the country. Now the steam loco shed is gone as steam engines were phased out.

== Facilities ==
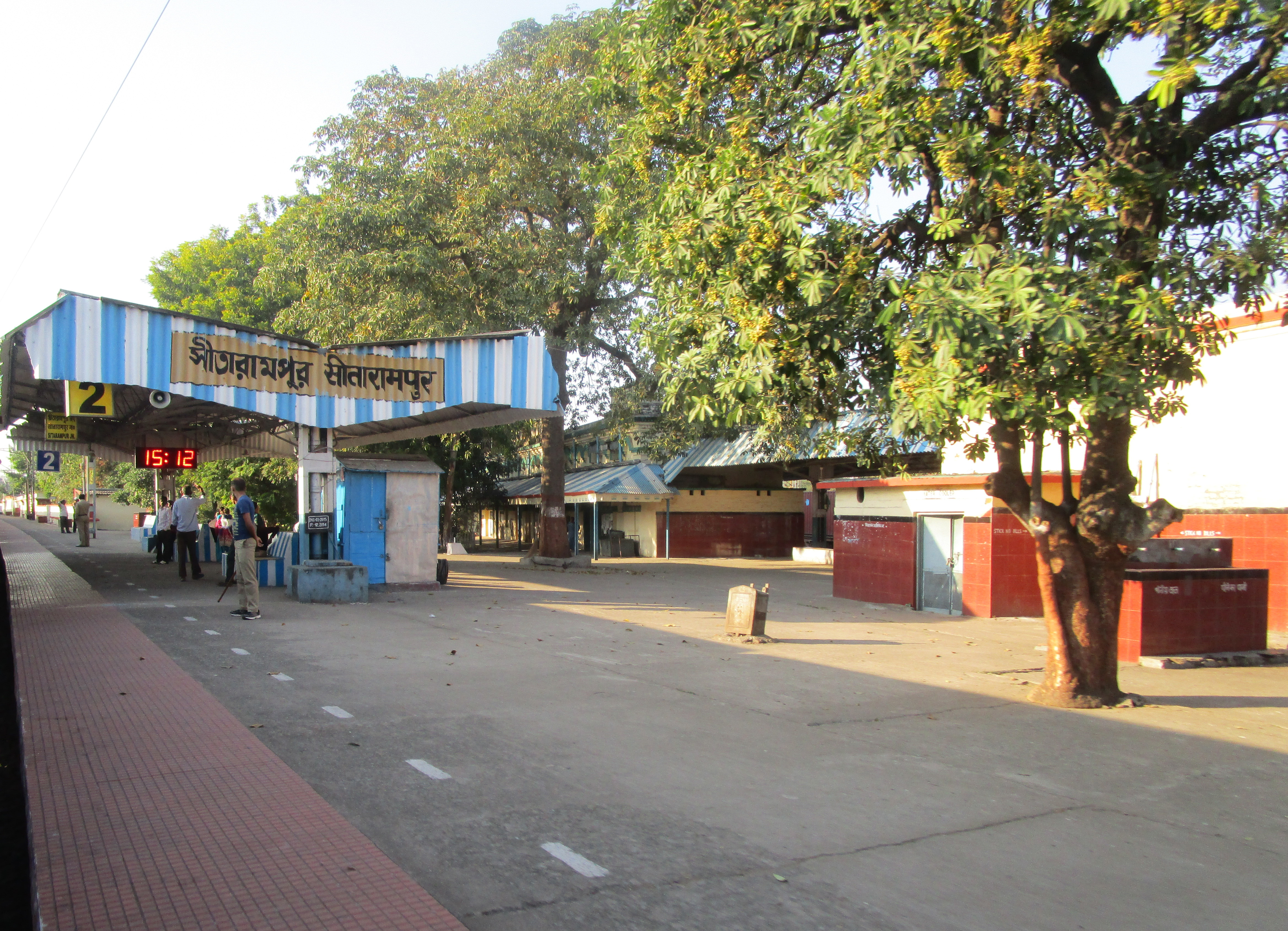
Sitarampur railway station platform

The major facilities available are waiting rooms, reservation counter,2 wheeler and 4 wheeler vehicle parking. The vehicles are allowed to enter the station premises. The station also has an STD/ISD/PCO telephone booth, ATM counter, toilets, tea stall and book stall.

=== Platforms ===
The platforms are connected by foot overbridge.
