= Ambajora Shikaripara railway station =

Railway station in Jharkhand

Ambajora Shikaripara
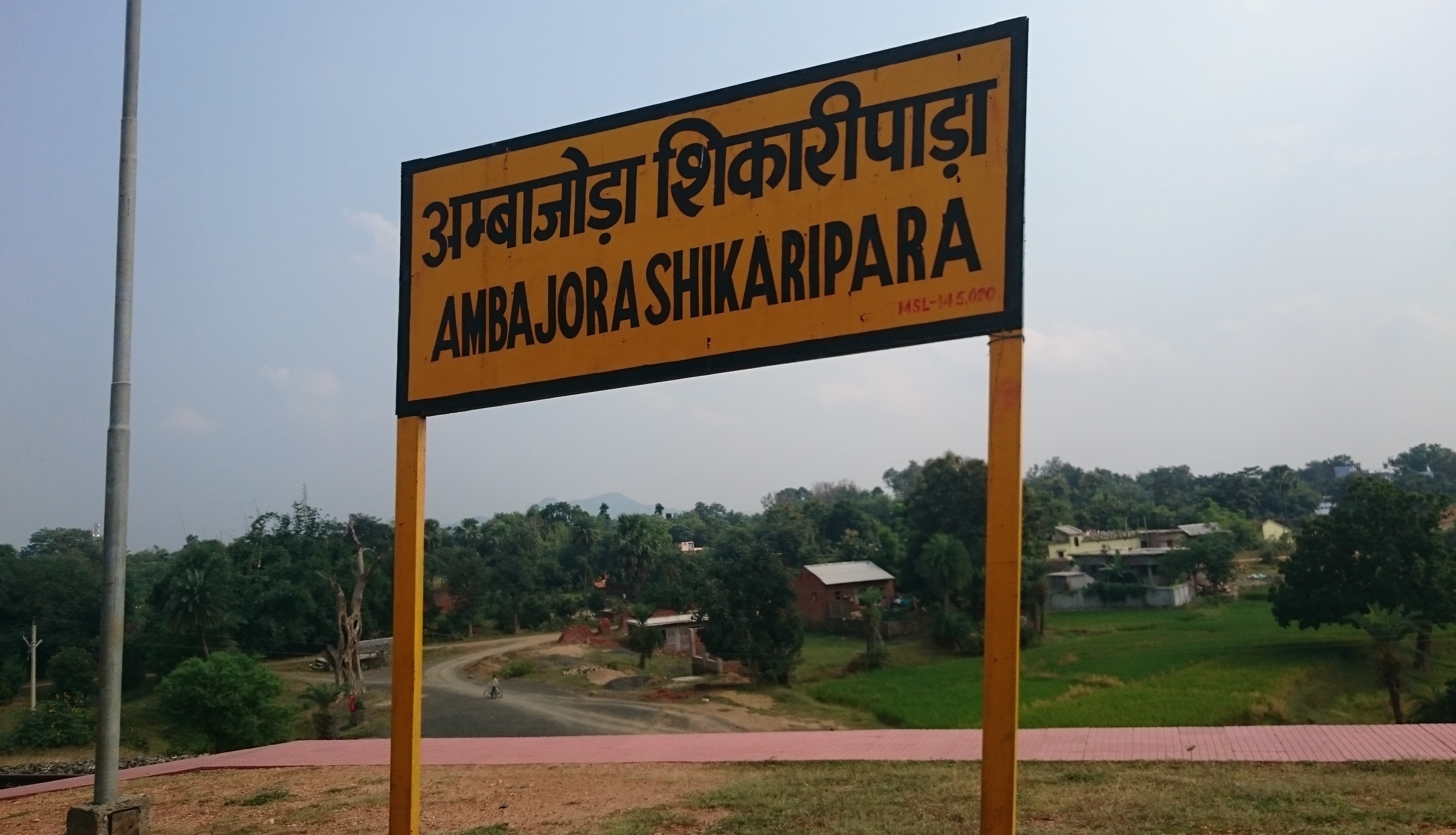
- Shikaripara railway station signboard

General information
- Location: NH114A, Shikaripara, Jharkhand 816118; India
- Coordinates: 24.2395371°N 87.4583414°E
- Elevation: 144 metres (472 ft)
- System: Indian Railways station
- Owner: Indian Railways
- Line: Jasidih–Dumka–Rampurhat line
- Platforms: 3
- Tracks: 3 (Single diesel line)
- Connections: Rampurhat Junction, Dumka

Construction
- Structure type: Standard (on ground station)
- Parking: Yes
- Cycle facilities: No

Other information
- Status: Functioning
- Station code: SKIP
- Zone(s): Eastern Railway
- Division(s): Howrah

History
- Opened: 2014
- Electrified: 2021

Services
Preceding station	Indian Railways	Following station
Barmasia towards Rampurhat Junction	Eastern Railway zone Jasidih–Dumka–Rampurhat line	Harinsing towards Jasidih Junction
Location
- Location within Jharkhand Location within India

Ambajora Shikaripara Railway Station is a main railway station on the Jasidih–Dumka–Rampurhat line , located in Shikaripara block of Dumka district, Jharkhand, India. Its code is SKIP. It serves Shikaripara town. The station consists of three platforms.

== Facilities ==
The major facilities available at Ambajora Shikaripara station are waiting rooms and vehicle parking.

=== Platforms ===
There are a total of three platforms and three tracks. The platforms are connected by foot overbridge. These platforms are built to accumulate 24 coaches express train.

=== Station layout ===
G	Street level	Exit/Entrance & ticket counter
P1	FOB, Side platform, No-1 doors will open on the left/right
P1	Track 1
P1	Track 2
P1	FOB, Island platform, No- 2 doors will open on the left/right
P1	Island platform, No- 3 doors will open on the left/right
P1	Track 3

== Major trains ==
Some of the important trains that serves Ambajora Shikaripara are :

- Howrah–Bhagalpur Kavi Guru Express
- Rampurhat–Jasidih Passenger

== See also ==
- Dumka
- Indian Railways
- Jasidih Junction
- Jasidih–Dumka–Rampurhat line
- Baidyanathdham Deoghar
- List of railway stations in India
