= Jasidih Junction railway station =

Railway station in Jharkhand, India

JASIDIH JUNCTION

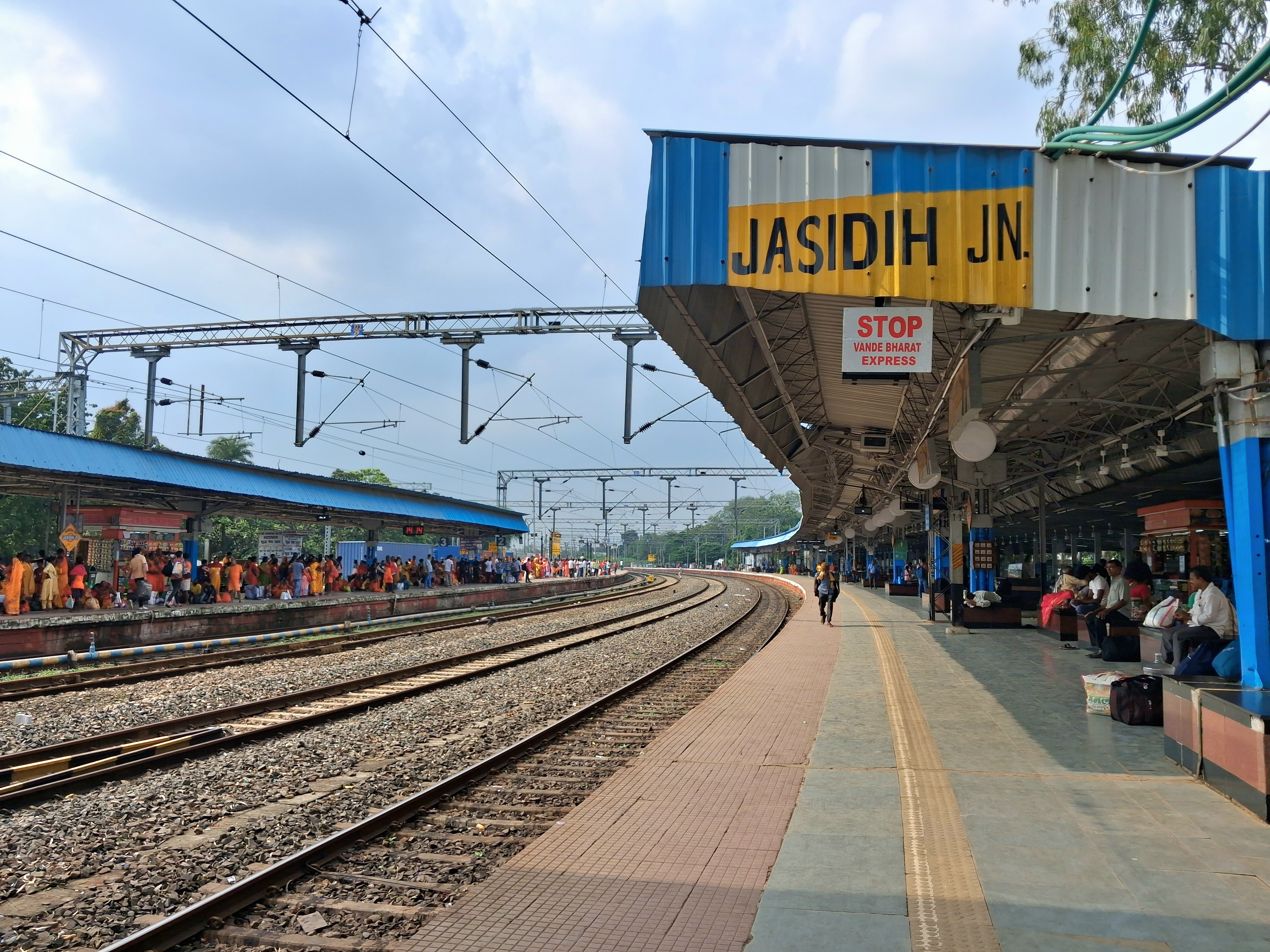
- Jasidih railway station platform

General information
- Location: Jasidih, Deoghar District, Jharkhand; India
- Coordinates: 24°30′54″N 86°38′40″E
- Elevation: 271 metres (889 ft)
- System: Express train and Passenger train station
- Owner: Indian Railways
- Operator: Eastern Railway
- Lines: Howrah–Delhi main line; Jasidih–Dumka–Rampurhat line; Jasidih–Banka–Bhagalpur line; Jasidih-Mohanpur-Hansdiha-Godda-Pirpainti line; Jasidih–Baidyanathdham branch line
- Platforms: 5
- Tracks: 9
- Connections: Auto stand, Bus stand

Construction
- Structure type: At grade
- Parking: Available
- Accessible: Available

Other information
- Status: Active
- Station code: JSME
- Zone(s): Eastern Railway
- Division(s): Asansol
- Classification: NSG-2

History
- Opened: 1871; 155 years ago
- Electrified: 1996–97
- Former names: East Indian Railway

Other services
Route map
- Source: Eastern Railway
Location
- Location within India Location within Jharkhand
- Interactive map of Jasidih Junction

Jasidih Junction (station code: JSME) is the busiest railway station of Jharkhand, in terms of train frequency and fourth in terms of footfalls after Dhanbad, Tatanagar and Ranchi and serving as the satellite station of Deoghar city in the Deoghar district in the Indian state of Jharkhand. It is often referred to as "Gateway to Santhal Paragana Division". Due to its strategic location and catering to millions of pilgrims visiting one of the twelve Jyotirlinga Baba Baidyanath Dham or Babadham,almost all the premium trains of country passing through Howrah - New Delhi Main Line stops here. It has also been included under the Amrit Bharat Station Scheme and is waiting to be upgraded with world-class services.

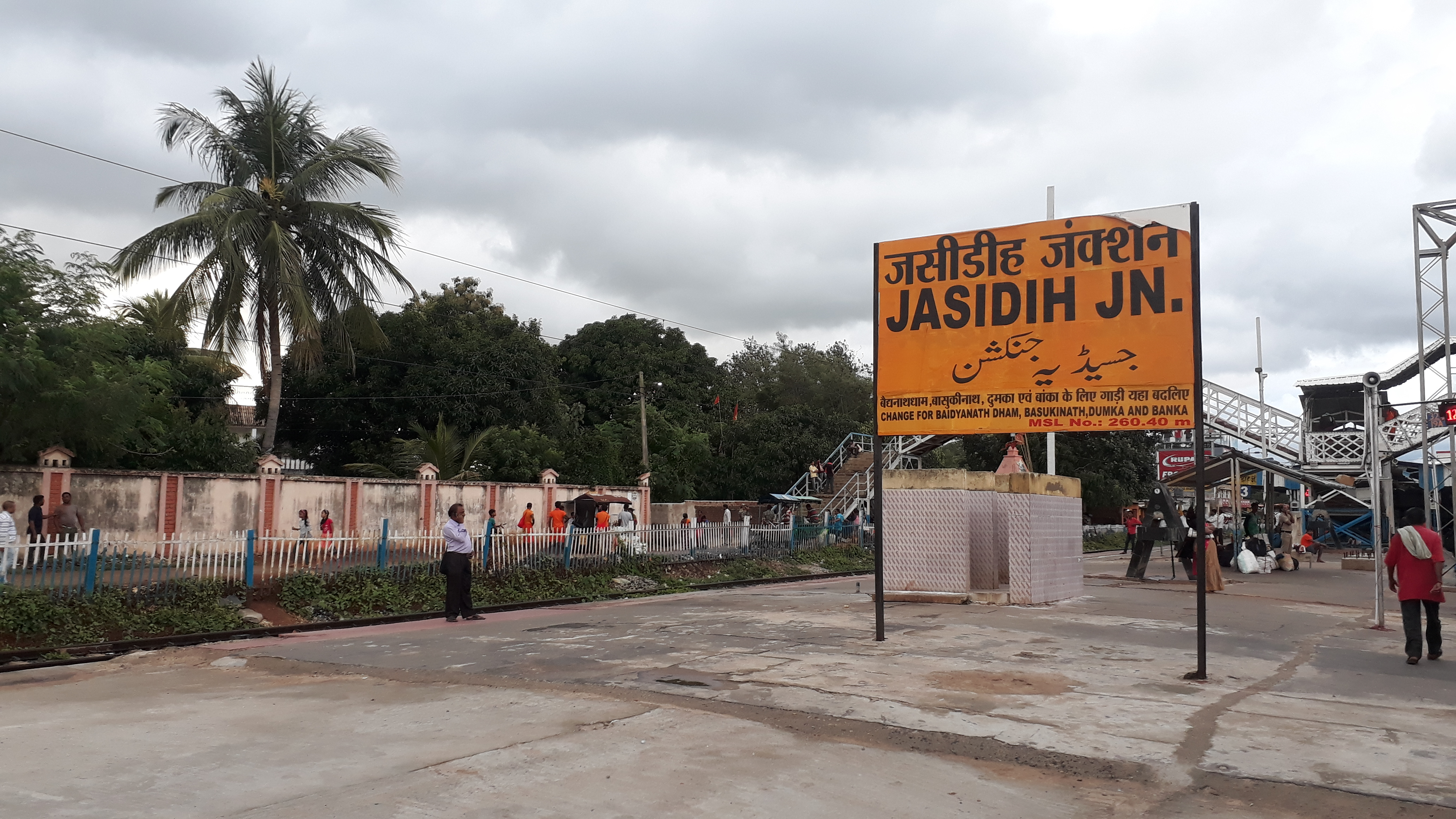

== Administration ==
Jasidih Junction is under the Asansol division of Eastern Railway zone of the Indian Railways.

== Further extension ==
The railways have proposed a Jasidih–bypass line after construction of which trains from Bhagalpur and Dumka can run up to Asansol and Dhanbad without loco reversal at Jasidih, also saving considerable time for the passengers. Deoghar Junction is being developed as a major halt station to decongest Jasidih and avoid a delay of more than 30 minutes for an engine change at Jasidih.

The 97-kilometre (60 mi)-long Jasidih–Hansdiha–Pirpainti line is under construction. As of April 2021, work is under progress on Mohanpur–Hansdiha and Godda–Pirpainti sections. The 32-kilometre (20 mi) Hansdiha–Godda section was inaugurated on 8 April 2021 and a Humsafar Express runs weekly from Godda to New Delhi. This line is considered important to connect the Godda district in the Santhal Pargana division of Jharkhand with the rest of India. The 80-kilometre (50 mi) Godda–Pakur line is also planned

== Facilities ==
The major facilities available are retiring room, waiting hall, computerized reservation facility, reservation counter, 2-wheeler and 4-wheeler vehicle parking. The vehicles are allowed to enter the station premises. The station also has STD/ISD/PCO telephone booth, ATM counter, toilets, refreshment room, tea stall and book stall.

== Trains ==
Jasidih station's location on the Howrah–New Delhi main line makes it served by several superfast, express and passenger trains from all over the country, Following are some of the premium train service are :

- Howrah–New Delhi Rajdhani Express (via Patna)
- Howrah–New Delhi Duronto Express
- Kolkata Shalimar–Patna AC Duronto Express
- Patna–Howrah Vande Bharat Express
- Varanasi–Deoghar Vande Bharat Express
- Kolkata–Patna Garib Rath Express
- Howrah–Patna Jan Shatabdi Express
- Madhupur–Anand Vihar Terminal Humsafar Express

== Originating trains ==
Long-distance trains which originate from Jasidih Junction railway station are as follows:

- Tambaram–Jasidih Ratna Express (Chennai) Weekly SF Express.
- Jasidih–Pune Weekly Express.
- Jasidih–Vasco-da-gama Weekly Express.
- Jasidih–SMVT Bengaluru Weekly SF Express.

== Nearest airports ==
The nearest airports to Jasidih Junction are:

- Deoghar Airport, Deoghar 15 kilometres (9.3 mi)
- Birsa Munda Airport, Ranchi 210 kilometres (130 mi)
- Gaya Airport 194 kilometres (121 mi)
- Lok Nayak Jayaprakash Airport, Patna 220 kilometres (140 mi)
- Netaji Subhas Chandra Bose International Airport, Kolkata 309 kilometres (192 mi)
- Kazi Nazrul Islam Airport, Andal, Durgapur 155 kilometres (96 mi)
- Varanasi Airport 457 kilometres (284 mi)

== Gallery ==
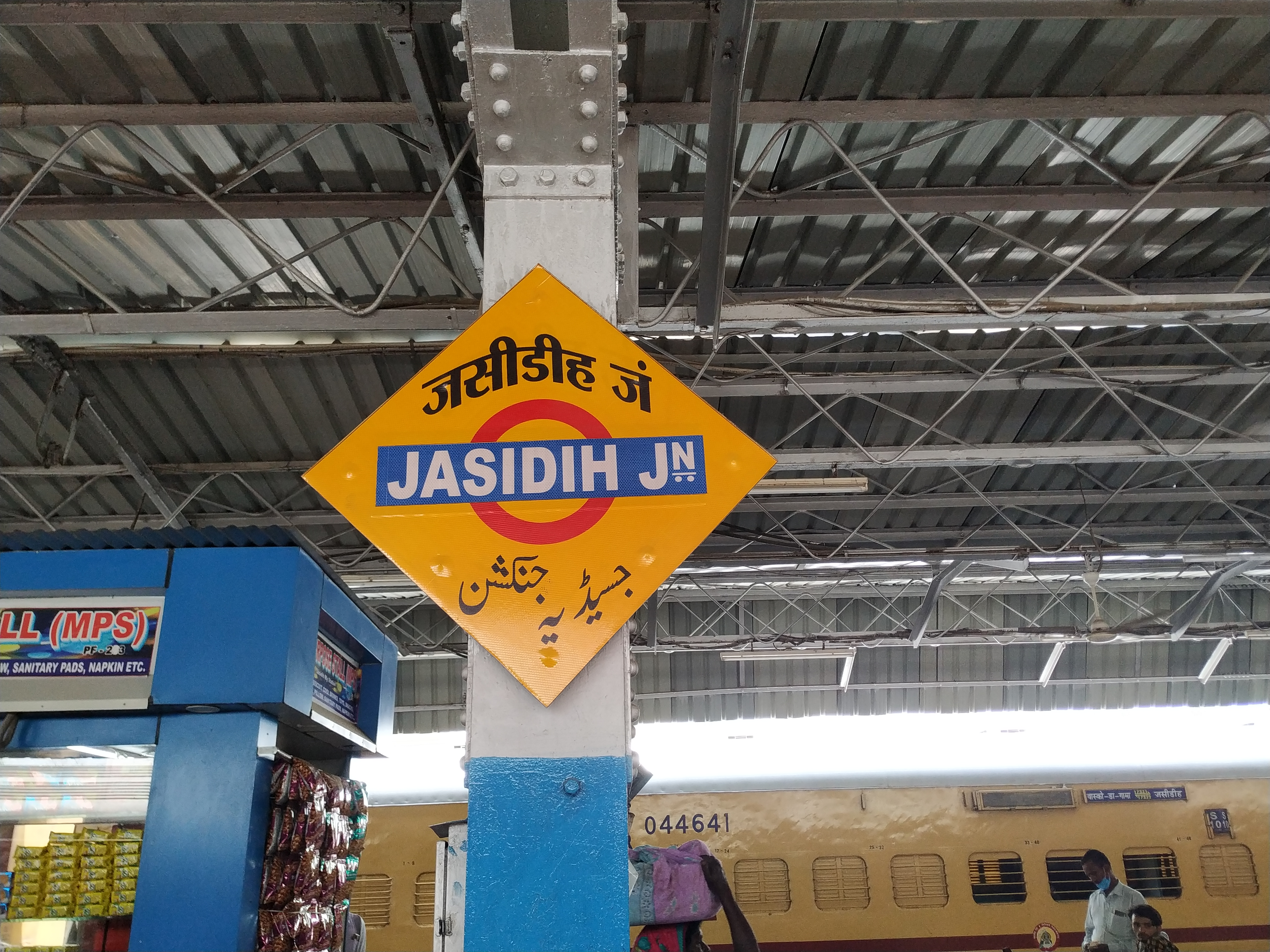
Jasidih Junction railway station board

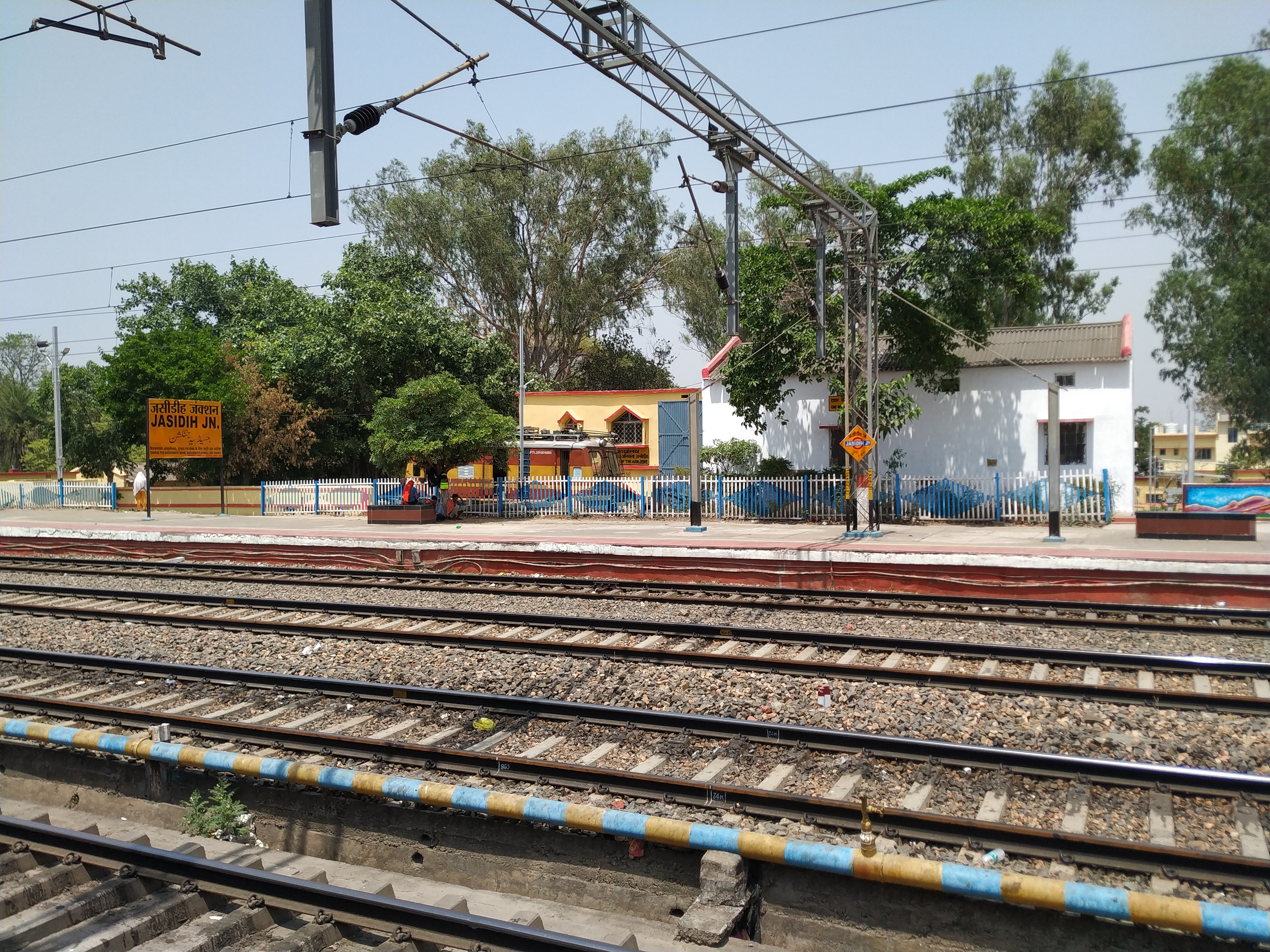
Jasidih Junction railway station

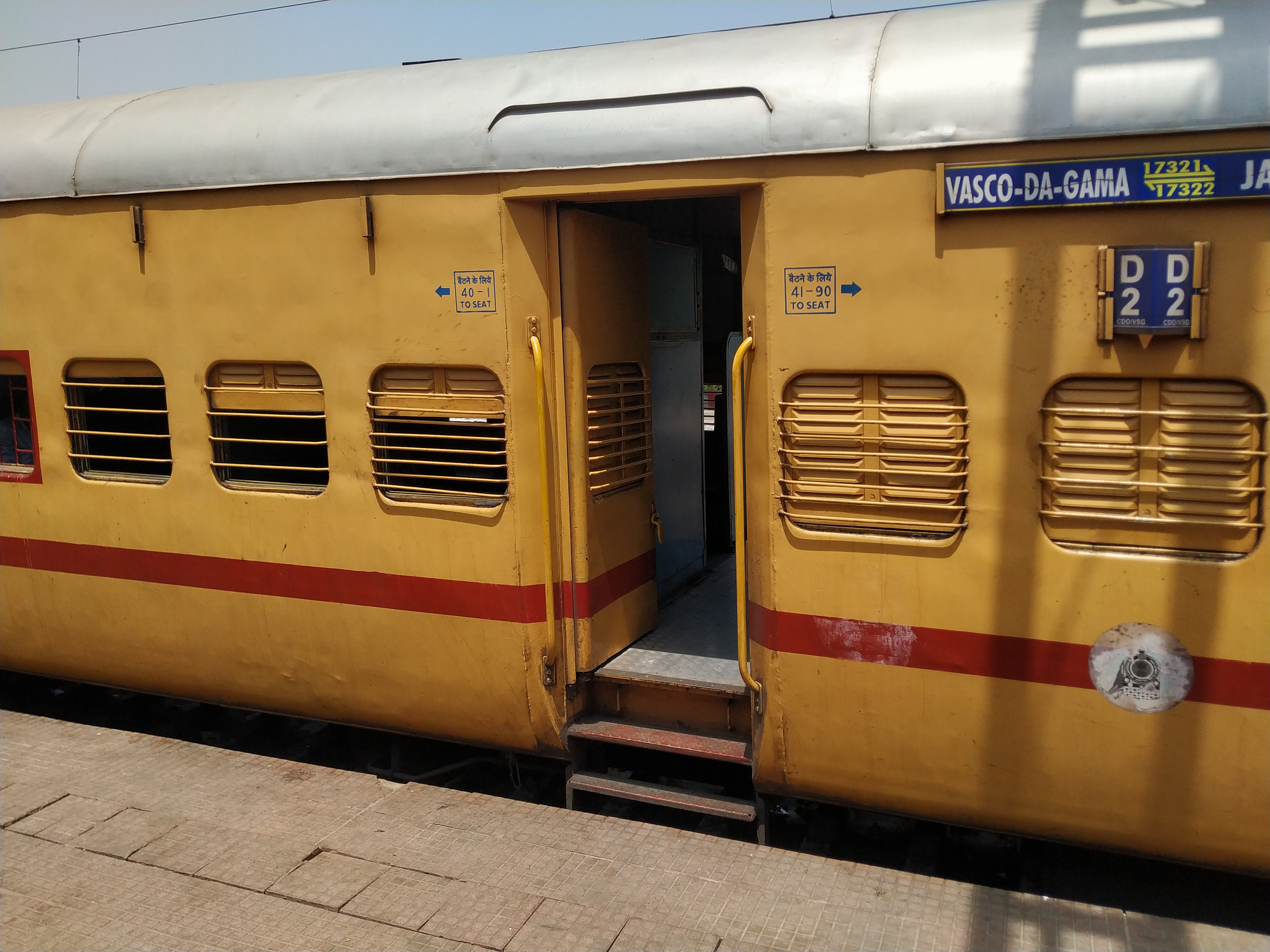
Jasidih - Vasco-Da-Gama Weekly Express is standing on Jasidih Junction

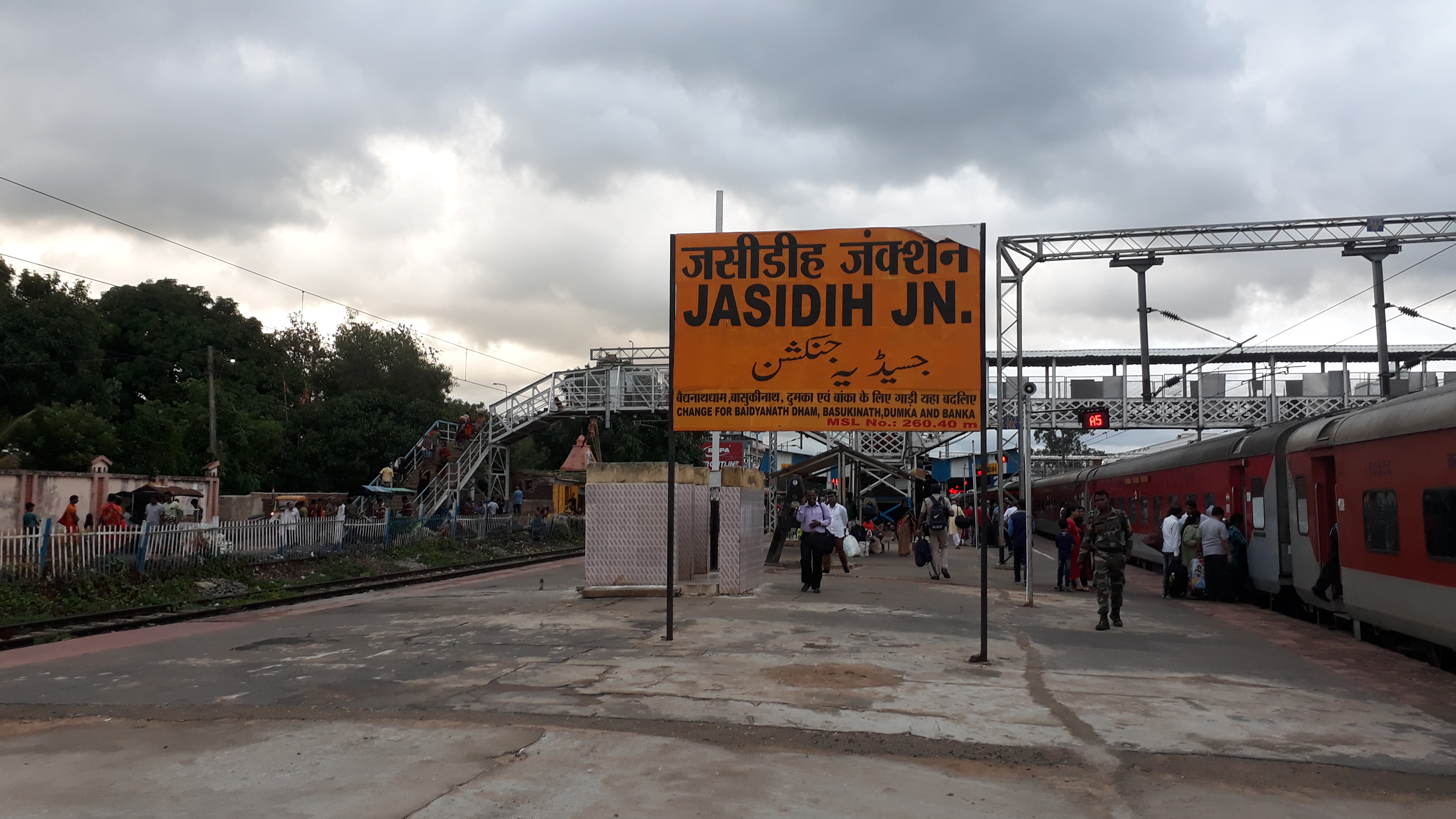
Jasidih Junction railway station board
