= Jagannath (disambiguation) =

Jagannath or Jagannatha is a deity worshipped in Hinduism and Buddhism.

Jagannath or Jagannatha may also refer to:

== People ==
- Jagannatha Samrat (1652–1744), Indian astronomer and mathematician
- Jagannatha Panditaraja, 17th-century poet and literary critic
- Jagannath Acharya, Nepalese politician
- Jagannath Azad (1918–2004), Indian poet
- Jagan Nath Kaul (1924–2008), Indian humanitarian
- Jagannath Mishra (21st century), Indian politician
- Jagannath Pahadia (1932–2021), Indian National Congress politician
- Jagannath Sami (21st century), Indo-Fijian soccer player
- Jagannath Shankar Shet (1800–1865), Indian activist
- Jagannath Shankarsett (1800–1865), Indian philanthropist and educationalist
- Manda Jagannath (1951–2025), Indian politician

== Other uses ==
- Jagannath University, a public university of Bangladesh
- Jagannath, Nepal (disambiguation), multiple locations
- Jagannath, a short-story collection by Karin Tidbeck
- Jagannath, Bheri, Nepal
- Jagannath, Seti, Nepal
- Sri Jagannath (film), a 1950 Indian Oriya film directed by Chitta Ranjan Mitra

== See also ==
- Jagannath Temple (disambiguation)
- Juggernaut (disambiguation)
- Jagannathpur (disambiguation)
- Jugnauth, an Indian surname, alternative spelling of Jagannath
- Jagernath Lachmon (1916–2001), Indo-Surinamese politician
