= Jagannadhapuram =

Jagannadhapuram is the name of several places in India:

- Jagannadhapuram, Kakinada, Andhra Pradesh
- Jagannadhapuram, Krishna district, Andhra Pradesh
- Jagannadhapuram, Tadepalligudem mandal, Andhra Pradesh
- Jagannadhapuram, Chittoor district, Andhra Pradesh

== See also ==
- Jagannathpur (disambiguation)
