= Triolet, Mauritius =

Coordinates: 20°03′S 57°33′E

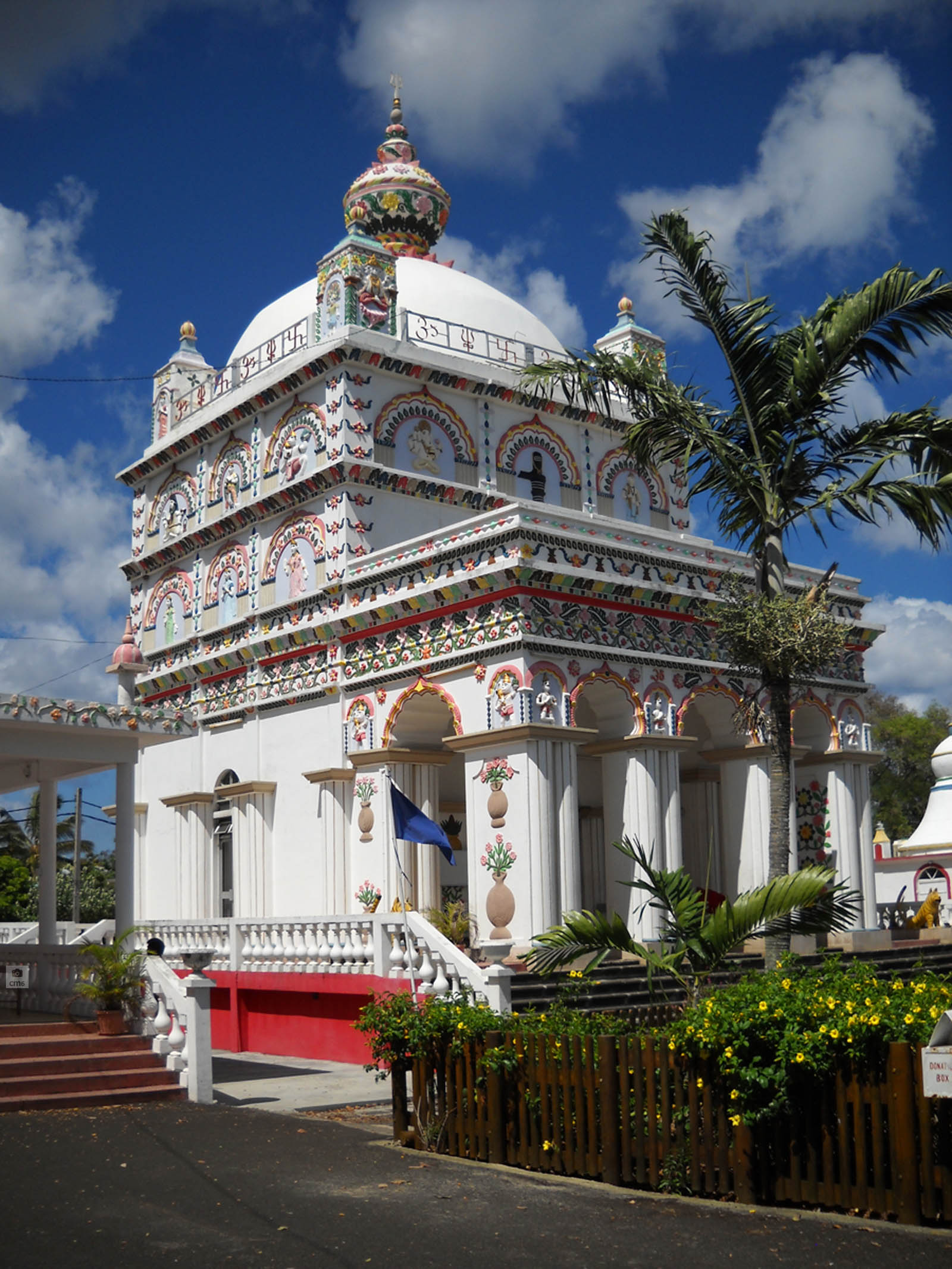
Maheswarnath Mandir, Triolet

Triolet is a medium-sized village in the north of the Mauritius district of Pamplemousses. It lies exactly 11 kilometres from Port Louis, the capital of the island. The town is nestled amidst green sugarcane fields, near the north-western coast of the island. As per the 2016 population census, Triolet had 24 073 inhabitants and a population density of 2764 inhabitants per km^{2}, over an area of 8.71 km^{2}. The population density is higher than that of the township of Vacoas-Phoenix which is at 1948 inhabitants per km^{2}.

To the north of Triolet lie Trou-aux-Biches, Mont Choisy and Grand Baie which are coastal villages, while to its west are Pointe-aux-Piments and Balaclava. On the south lies Arsenal and to the east are Morcellement St André and Plaine des Papayes.

== Economy ==
The economy of Triolet has historically mostly been agricultural. Like other agglomerations in Mauritius, it was largely set up from Indian origin Indentured workers and African slaves working on the sugar estates around, the latest of which to shut down was the Solitude estate. With time the population has evolved and many of the indentured workers evolved to small planters and land-owners. Following the diversification policies of the 70's, 80's and 90's sizeable parts of the population moved to manufacturing and tourism. Recently a significant portion of the population has also gone into the civil service and service sectors, especially IT and Finance.

== Infrastructure ==
Triolet has a main road that is almost perfectly straight, which goes all the way to the north-western coastal village and popular tourist resort Grand Baie. Along this main road most of the infrastructure has developed. It has mostly parallel secondary roads that cross at right-angles.

There is a village hall where political and administrative decisions are taken, a women's centre and a youth centre. Triolet has most government services operations represented, including Police, Fire Station, Post Office, National Pensions Office and Social Security Office. A government library can also be found, behind the Social Welfare centre. It is sometimes referred to as the CLAC (Centre de Lecture et d’Animation Culturelle). Although the library is stocked with classical authors, the collection is not thorough and well-arranged. However, the library has a poor collection of modern fiction, which is often a cause of complaint. The library is frequented by students of the nearby schools.

It also has three government primary schools and various private primary schools. It has two state secondary schools, Lady Sushil Ramgoolam State Secondary School, Triolet State Secondary School for Boys, and one private secondary school, the International College.

Lately, various banks have opened in Triolet, with nearly every bank on the island having a branch there. There are various major department stores such as Courts Ltd, J Kalachand Ltd, Galaxy Ltd.

Infrastructural developments include a children's playground and market situated in the Bon-Air road which leads to Morcellement St. Andre.

Triolet has one football field, the Rabindranath Ghurburrun Stadium, that is used for local football tournaments. This is not really a stadium as it is not regularly maintained and has little or no seating arrangements.

A sports complex is believed to be planned to cater for the lack of sports facilities in the village.

== Etymology ==
The word "Triolet" has its origins in a very specific type of French poem, before the French renaissance. Un "Triolet", a "triplet" in English, denotes a very specific type of poem. Triolet is the oldest and simplest form of poetry that was used during the golden age of lyric poetry.

The Triolet is also a method for timekeeping in western classical music, where the time-scale of a note is divided into 3 distinctive divisions (rather than into 2), which may or may not be of equal length. Their being three, gives rise to the word Triolet, the French equivalent of triplet. This is demonstrated in the article on the western music.

== Localities ==
1. Solitude

This locality is the region at the southernmost of the town, named thus as it used to be a very isolated location, hence the name "solitude", French for "loneliness". It is also where the Solitude Lake is located, a place where many of the town's children and sometimes older people like to go fishing, the locally called "Tilapia" being the most common fish in the lake.

2. 7th Mile This is the region near the south of the town, where the milestone marking the exact distance of 11 km (7 mi) from the capital Port Louis is found.

3. Montagne Chatte This locality lies slightly further north of 7th mile.

4.Brahmasthan This region is marked by a Mandir (Temple) where the remains of an indentured labourer were cremated. It was believed that an indentured labourer who had wanted to return home to India was murdered by the landowners so that he would not need to be paid a huge sum. After his demise a number of unfathomable incidents occurred after which a cremation ceremony had to be organised to pacify his soul. He was of the Brahmin caste, hence the name Brahmsthan, from Brahmin-sthaan, or death place of a Brahmin.

5. Cinema Cassé North from 7th mile, there used to be a cinema here. Upon the destruction of the cinema this region due to an incident inside the cinema it was named cinéma cassé, literally, "broken cinema".

6. Derningham This locality was originally named Darlingham. This proved quite difficult to pronounce for the town people who mainly speaks creole and, in the distant past used to speak their respective countries of origin's languages. They used to pronounce Daarling, which became Daarning. From there, the name became Derningham, as it is still used today.

7. Margaret Hall/JSS Square On the cross-roads leading to the Lady Sushil Ramgoolam SSS lies an empty plot of land where there once was a hall known as Margaret Hall. While the hall is gone, elders remember the place as Margaret Hall. This area is currently called JSS square after the state secondary school which used to be called Junior Secondary School (JSS).

8. T.B.S. Lane The Triolet Bus Service has its headquarters here, and hence the lane and the region around is known as T.B.S lane.

9. Chemin Japonais/Chemin Pointe-aux-Piments The road leading to the village of Pointe-aux-Piments used to be called hemin Japonais. It has been renamed Shrimati Indira Gandhi Road but it is popularly known as Chemin Pointe-aux-Piments, thus the road to Pointe-aux-Piments.

10. 8th mile This region is named after the milestone that marks exactly 13 km (8 mi) from Port Louis, the capital.

11. Anand Square At this location is a disused cinema hall known as Anand Cinema. Currently in renovation since 2007, it has given its name to the area around it.

12. Camp Lila Located along the road to pointe-aux-piments, this is a densely populated area.

13. Camp Sada

14. Camp Moti

15. Trois-Boutiques At this point there used to be three different shops at each side of a cross-road, hence the name Trois-Boutiques, three shops.

16. 9th Mile This is the point of the milestone marking exactly 14 km (9 mi) Miles from Port Louis. The milestone can be seen right beside the wall of Dhaneswock Sewraz Govt school, adjacent to the pedestrian crossing.

17. Terminus This place is where the historical Maheswarnath Mandir is located as well as where the T.B.S. has its bus terminal. In French, Terminus.

18. Trou-aux-Biches Road This is the region around the road that leads to Trou-aux-Biches.

19. Chemin 20 pieds Further north from the Terminus region lies a large road that leads straight to Grand Baie. This road it is believed was constructed by the English and was used in 1810 during the battle against the French who were occupying the country before 1810.This road was used by the English to reach Port Louis easily through Cap Malheureux, where they landed by ships. While most main roads are 5.5 m (18 ft) wide, this road was made 6 m (20 ft), hence the name "chemin 20 pieds" the "20 ft (6 m) wide road"

=== Landmarks ===
Triolet is recognizable by four main landmarks:

1. The Solitude Lake, a freshwater lake formed from a natural water source at its south, in the region known as Solitude.

2. The chimney tower of the old Solitude Sugar Mill.

3. The sugarcane mill chimney at Bon Air

4. The Maheshwarnath Mandir (Hindu Temple) located near its northernmost tip.

=== The Maheshwarnath Temple legend ===
According to legend during the town's main Hindu temple's construction a huge pot of gold and silver coins were found buried on the very spot where the temple was being made. It is believed by many that this gold must have belonged to Indian Ocean pirates from the previous century, who used to attack east Indian company ships for their gold and other precious goods. The money found was then used for the construction of the temple.

=== The first Maha Shivratree Pilgrimage ===
The presence the Maheshwarnath Temple, the largest of its kind on the island, contributes to the religious significance of the village. The village is believed to be the starting point for the first-ever Mahashivaratree pilgrimage. The pilgrimage began when a resident of Triolet had a vision of a sacred lake surrounded by dense forestry.

A group of sages, set out on a journey inland in search for this lake. They discovered the Ganga Talao, also known as the Grand-Bassin (literally: the big lake). With time, this has given a major significance to the Mahashivratri festival on the island and people from several Hindu Traditions on the island annually converge to this sacred river, the local equivalent of the Ganges River.

=== Lore ===
Triolet is largest village in Mauritius by population as well as area. Triolet is the longest village in Mauritius, stretching nearly three miles, from Solitude to Trou-aux-Biches.

== Politics ==
Triolet is part of the main axis of the Electoral Constituency Number 5 (Triolet-Pamplemousses). It was traditionally a fortress of the Ramgoolam political dynasty, and a pro-Mauritius Labour Party constituency. However, a significant portion of its population also support the Jugnauth dynasty. The various groups that confront each other in village elections bear more or less allegiance to one of these two main parties. In the 2014 general elections, the Prime Minister at that time, Dr. Ramgoolam, lost his seat at the assembly as he lost the elections in constituency number five.
