= Jagdishpur (disambiguation) =

Jagdishpur may refer to:

- Jagdishpur, a city and subdivision of Bhojpur district, Bihar, India
  - Jagdishpur estate, a princely estate in British India
  - Jagdishpur, Bihar Assembly constituency, a constituency of the Bihar Legislative Assembly
  - Jagdishpur Halt railway station
- Jagdishpur (Industrial Area) near Amethi, Uttar Pradesh, India
  - Jagdishpur, Uttar Pradesh Assembly constituency, a constituency of the Uttar Pradesh Legislative Assembly
- Jagdishpur Reservoir, a reservoir in Kapilvastu district, Nepal
- Jagdishpur, Dih, Raebareli, a village in Uttar Pradesh, India
- Jagdishpur, Sultanpur, a town in Uttar Pradesh, India
- Jagdishpur, Bhopal, a village in Madhya Pradesh, India; also known as Islamnagar
- Puri, a city in Odisha, India; as the home of the Jagannath Temple, Puri also known as Jagdishpur and Jagannath Puri

== See also ==
- Jagdishpur Assembly constituency (disambiguation)
- Jagannathpur (disambiguation)
- Jagadishpur, town in West Bengal, India
- Jagdish, an Indian male given name
- Pur (disambiguation)
