= Jagannath, Nepal =

Jagannath, Nepal may refer to:

- Jagannath, Bheri
- Jagannath, Seti
