= Jammavaram =

Coordinates: 16.73596°N 80.36656°E

Jammavaram is a village near Kanchikacherla, Andhra Pradesh, India, located in Veerullapadu Mandal.

It has a population of about 1400, and literacy rate is above 70%.

Supreme Court Chief Justice N V Ramana who sworn in on 24 April 2021 has studied from 6th to 8th class in ZPH school in Jammavaram.
