= Jagannadhapuram, Chittoor district =

Jagannadhapuram
- Village
- Interactive map of Jagannadhapuram
- Location in Andhra Pradesh, India
- Coordinates: 13°18′29″N 79°43′06″E
- Country: India
- State: Andhra Pradesh
- District: Chittoor
- Talukas: Vijayapuram

Area
  - Total: 7.83 km^{2} (3.02 sq mi)

Population (2011)
  - Total: 1,126
  - Density: 144/km^{2} (372/sq mi)

Languages
  - Official: Telugu
- Time zone: UTC+5:30 (IST)
- PIN: AP-517586
- Telephone code: 91-8577

Jagannadhapuram is a village in Chittoor district of the Indian state of Andhra Pradesh. It is located in Vijayapuram mandal of Chittoor revenue division.
