= Trou-aux-Biches =

Town in Pamplemousses, Mauritius

Coordinates: 20°03′S 57°33′E

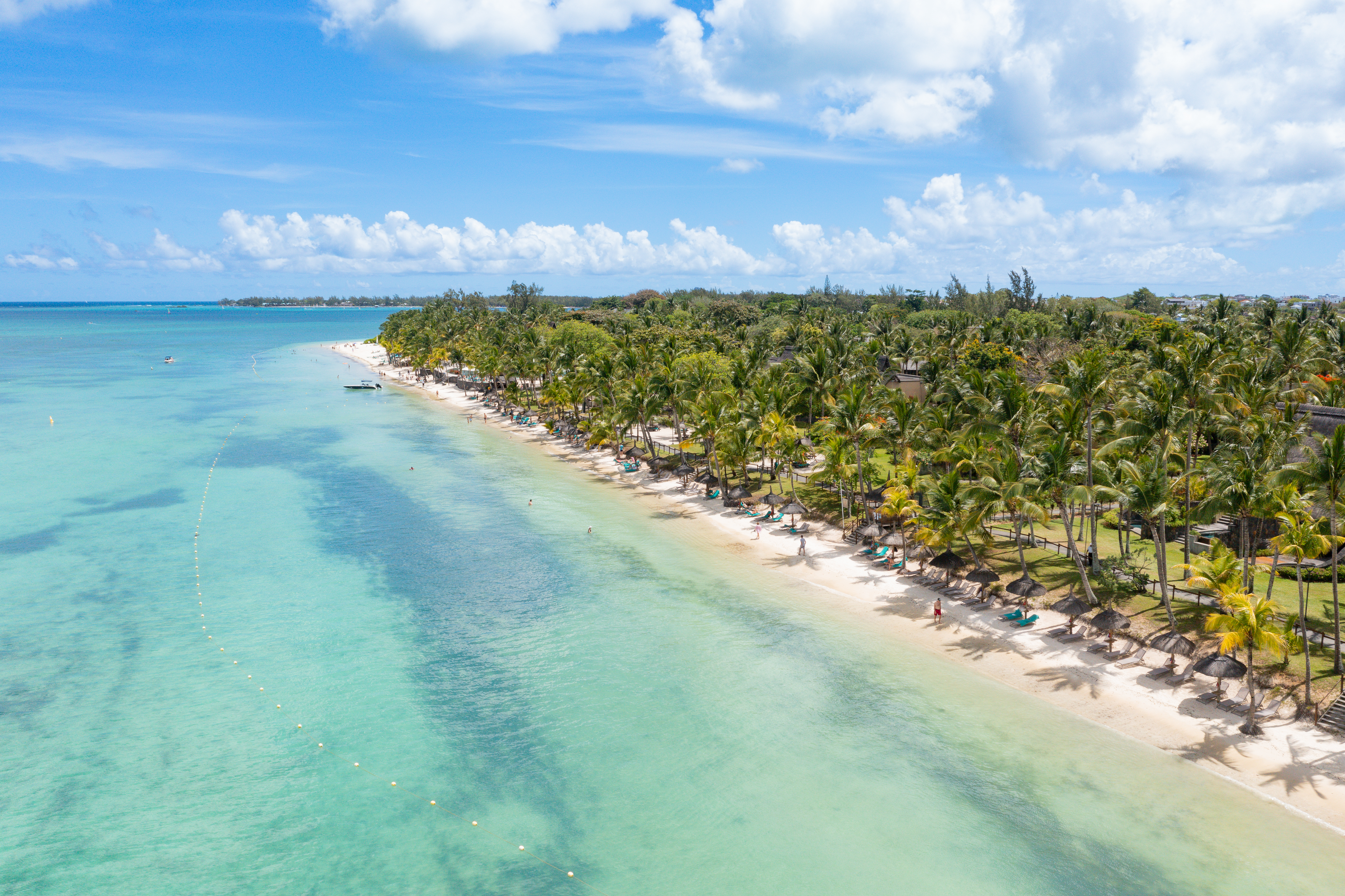
Trou-aux-Biches beach

Trou-aux-Biches is a small town with a public beach on the northern coast of Mauritius, in the district of Pamplemousses. According to the World Travel group, the beach is one of the most beautiful on the island. They awarded it the World's Leading Beach Destination at the World Travel Award for 2011. Many tourist resorts and boutique hotels are situated near the beach, such as the Trou aux Biches Resort & Spa. From Port Louis, the M2 highway heads towards it, with Trou-aux-Biches about a mile west from the end of M2. The airport and the town are connected by a public bus.

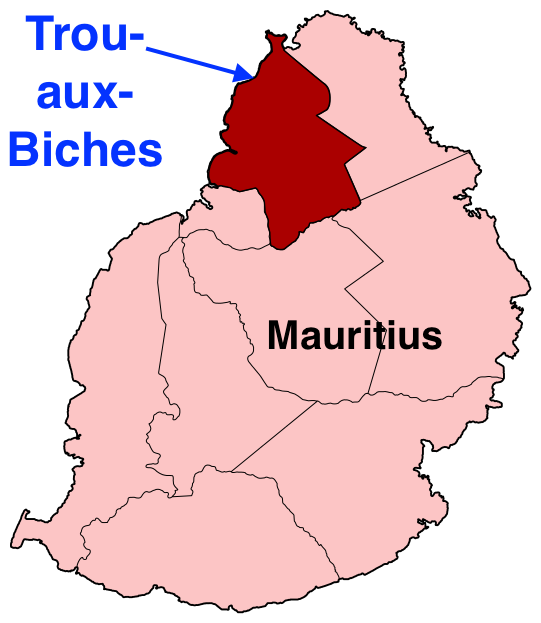
Trou-aux-Biches, Mauritius

Trou-aux-Biches started off as a fishing village in the 19th century, and its name appears on the Lislet-Geoffroy map drawn in 1807 during the French colonial rule of the island. In recent time, it has evolved into a small town with a two kilometer long white sand beach shaded by casuarina trees, snorkeling reefs, boutique shops, a supermarket and other facilities along the B38 road catering to family tourism.

While tourism began in Mauritius in 1952 with the construction of a small hotel in Curepipe for air crews arriving in colonial Mauritius, the first major hotel was built in Trou-aux-Biches in 1971 after Mauritius gained independence in 1968. The town retains its village style and is less commercialized than nearby Grand Baie. Inland from the town is Maheswarnath Mandir, the island's largest Hindu temple, founded in 1888.

The beach at Trou-aux-Biches is popular for sunset watching.

== Gallery ==
Scenes from Trou-aux-Biches
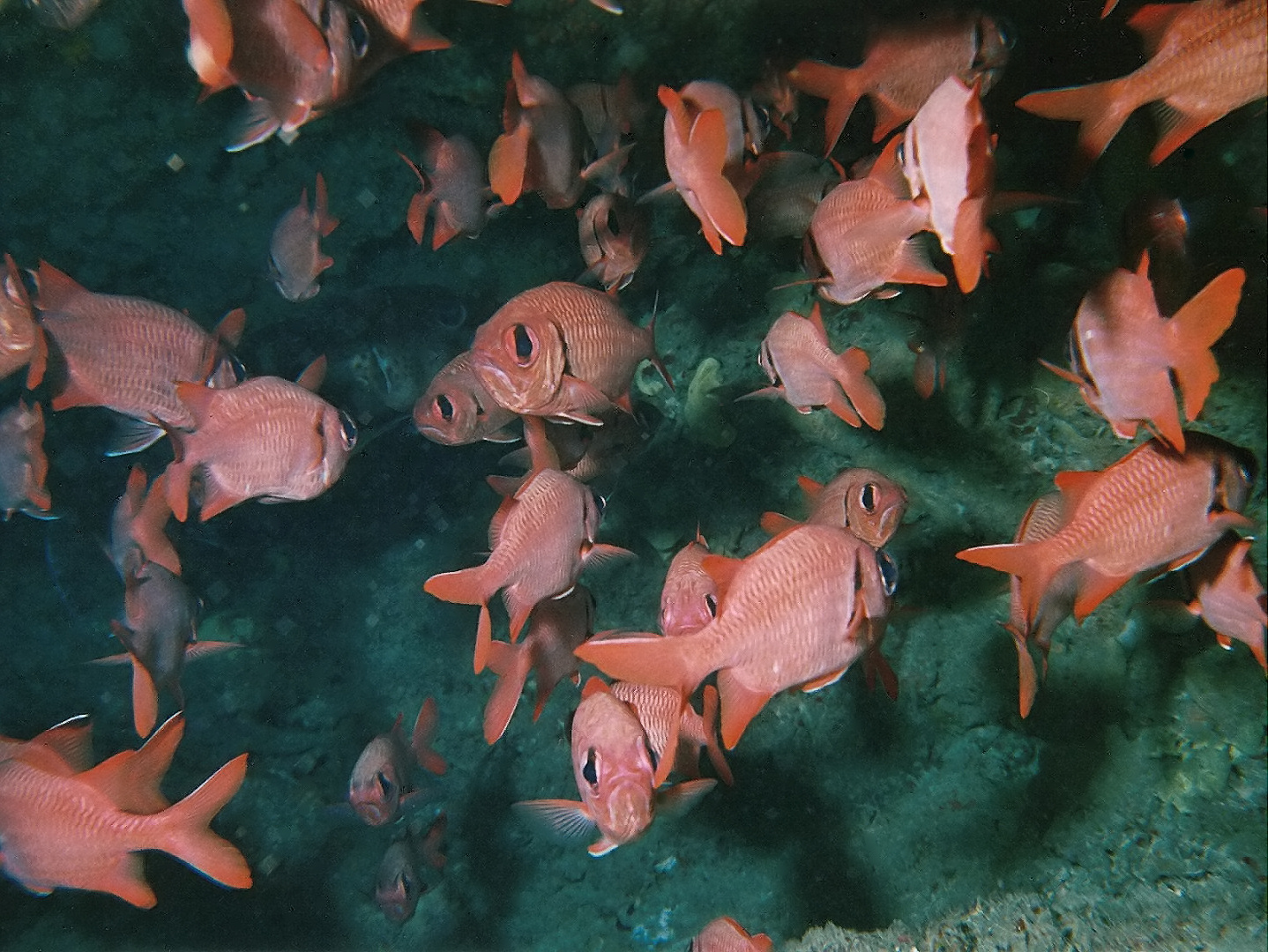
Snorkeling

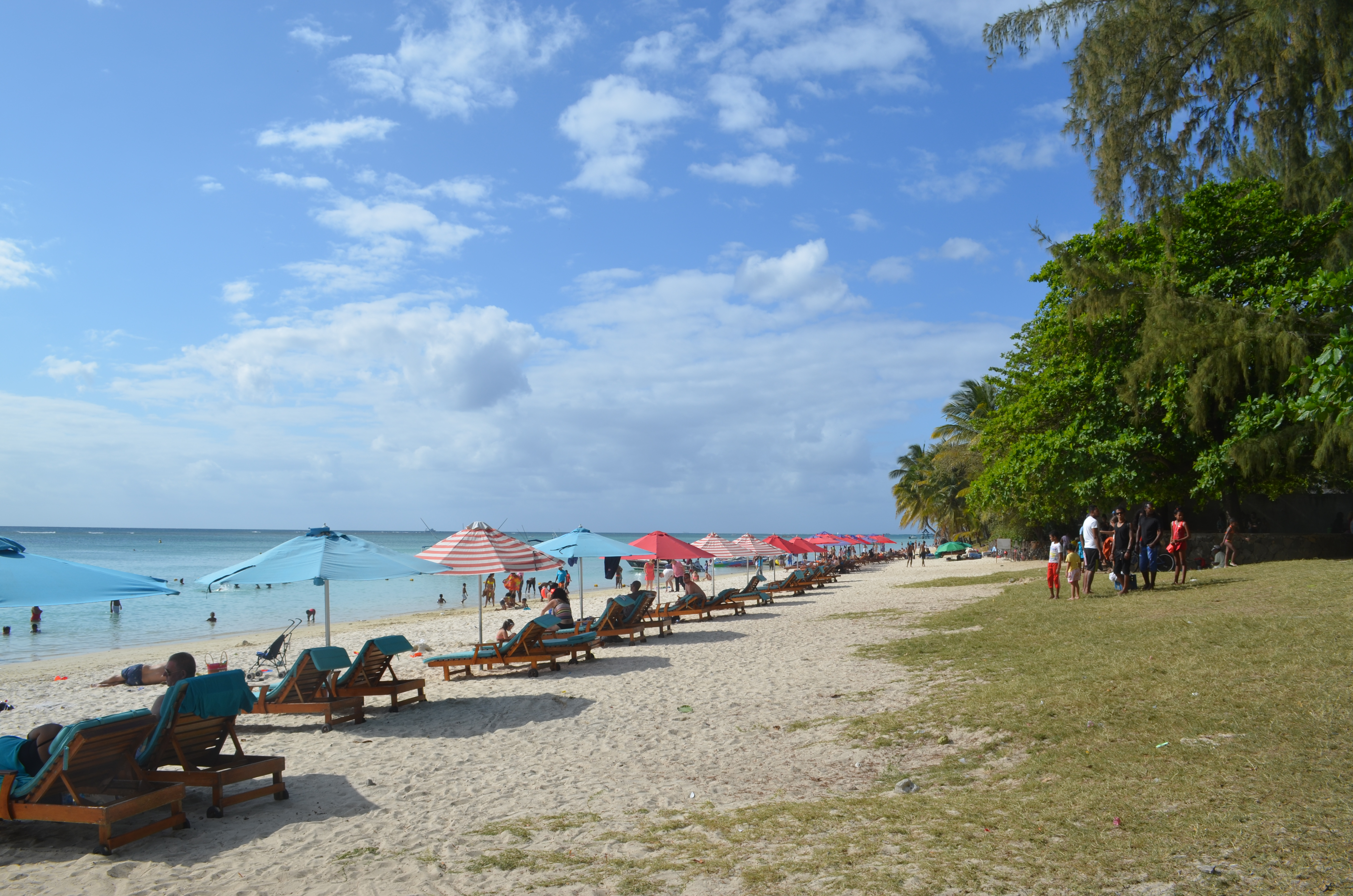
The beach

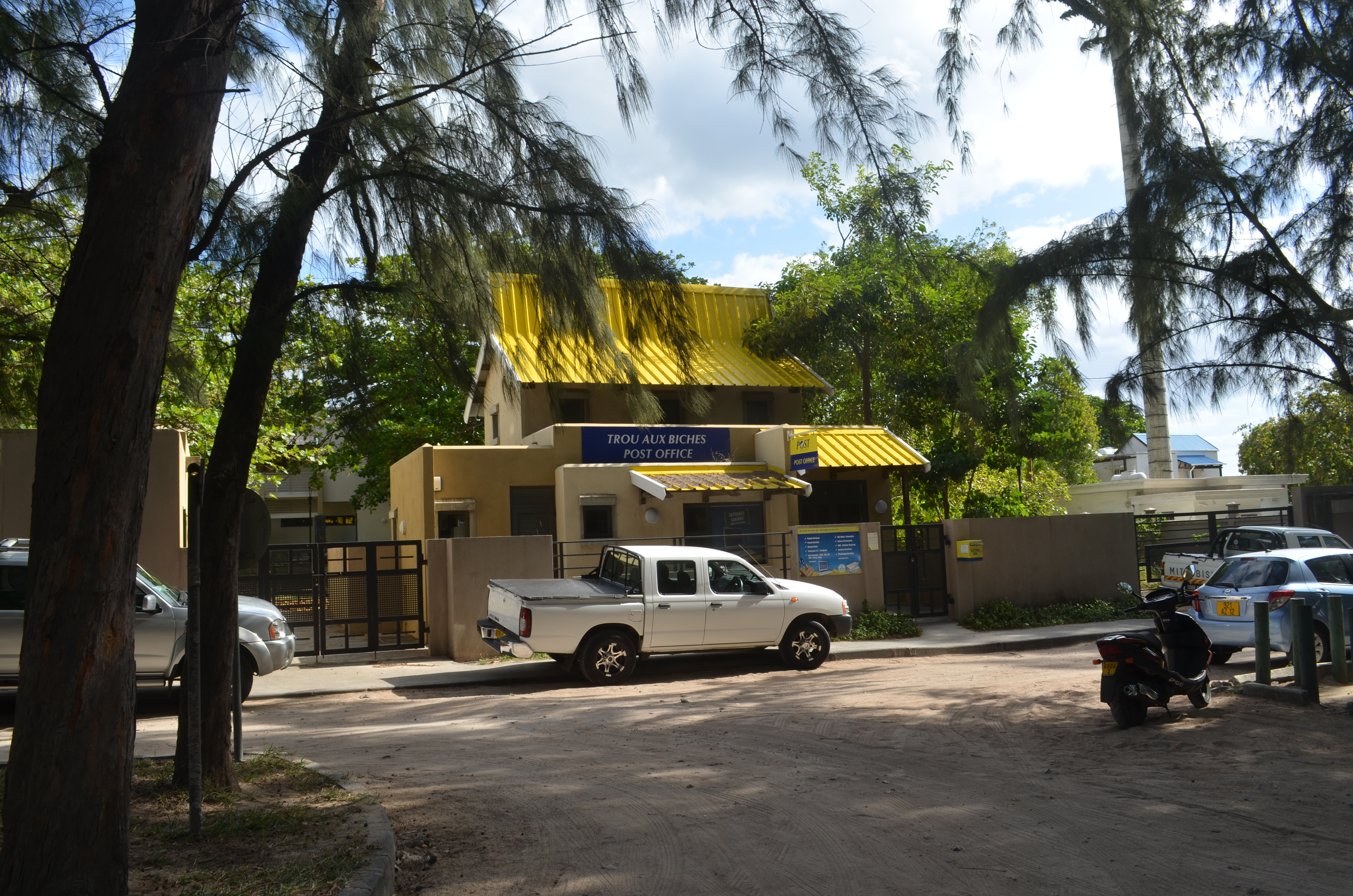
The Post Office at Trou-aux-Biches
