= Jagannathpur =

Jagannathpur refers to:

- Jagannathpur Upazila, an upazila in Sunamganj District, Sylhet Division, Bangladesh
- Jagannathpur, Bankura, a village in Bankura district, West Bengal, India
- Jagannathpur, Malda, a census town in Malda district, West Bengal, India
- Jagannathpur-Parulia, a village in East Singhbhum district, Jharkhand, India
- Jagannathapur railway station, a railway station in Ganjam district, Odisha, India
- Puri (city), a city in Odisha, India; as the home of the Jagannath Temple, Puri also known as Jagdishpur and Jagannath Puri

== See also ==
- Jagannath (disambiguation)
- Jagannadhapuram (disambiguation)
- Jagdishpur (disambiguation)
