= Jagannadhapuram, NTR district =

Jagannadhapuram
- Village
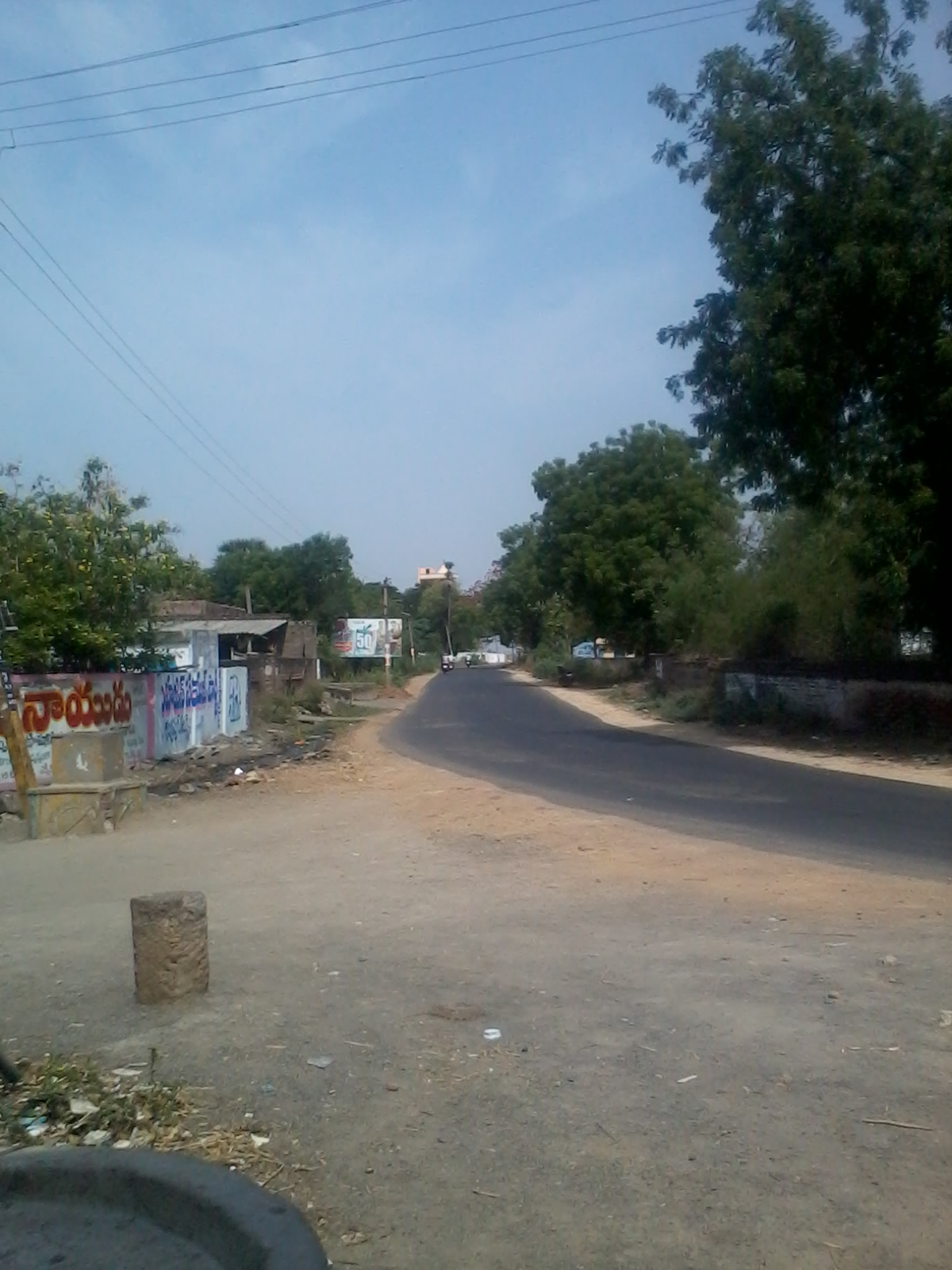
- Main Road
- Interactive map of Jagannadhapuram
- Location in Andhra Pradesh, India
- Coordinates: 16.728669°N 80.409776°E
- Country: India
- State: Andhra Pradesh
- District: NTR
- Mandal: Veerullapadu

Government
  - Type: Gram panchayat
  - Body: Jagannadhapuram Grama panchayat

Area
  - Total: 2.82 km^{2} (1.09 sq mi)

Population (2011)
  - Total: 784
  - Density: 278/km^{2} (720/sq mi)
- Demonym: Jagannadhite

Languages
  - Official: Telugu
- Time zone: UTC+5:30 (IST)
- Pincode(s): 521181
- Vehicle registration: AP 39

Jagannadhapuram is a village in NTR District of the Indian state of Andhra Pradesh. It is located in veerullapadu mandal of Nandigama revenue division.

== Structures ==
The village has a church, temple, and elementary school. Its main road comes from Kanchikacherla on one end, and Jujuru from the other.

== History ==
It is believed that a man named "Jagannathan" first settled in this village along with his family. It is from him that the village acquired its name. Initially, Hindus from ponnavaram settled in jagannadhapuram. After them families of Bonthu, Thanam, Thumma, Syamala, Bandi, Udumula, Thirumalareddy, Yeruva came from Paatibandla in Guntur district and settled here. Merugumala, Pappula, Vemula, Singu families also live here.

Christianity and Hinduism are major religions that are followed.

== Politics ==
The Gram panchayat seat was won by YSR Congress Party.

Jagannadhapuram, NTR district under Veerullapadu mandal is represented by Nandigama (SC) (Assembly constituency), which in turn represents Vijayawada (Lok Sabha constituency) of Andhra Pradesh. The present MLA representing Nandigama (SC) (Assembly constituency) is Tangirala Sowmya of the Telugu Desam Party, serving since the induction of the 16th Andhra Pradesh Legislative Assembly.
