= Jagdishpur Assembly constituency =

Jagdishpur Assembly constituency may refer to these state electoral constituencies in India:

- Jagdishpur, Bihar Assembly constituency
- Jagdishpur, Uttar Pradesh Assembly constituency

== See also ==
- Jagdishpur (disambiguation)
