= Vijayapuram, Chittoor district =

Vijayapuram
- Village
- Interactive map of Vijayapuram
- Location in Andhra Pradesh, India Vijayapuram (India)
- Coordinates: 13°19′05″N 79°43′45″E
- Country: India
- State: Andhra Pradesh
- District: Chittoor
- Mandal: Vijayapuram

Area
  - Total: 15.61 km^{2} (6.03 sq mi)

Population (2011)
  - Total: 3,750
  - Density: 240/km^{2} (622/sq mi)

Languages
  - Official: Telugu
- Time zone: UTC+5:30 (IST)
- Vehicle registration: AP

Vijayapuram is a village in Chittoor district of the Indian state of Andhra Pradesh. It is located in Vijayapuram mandal of Nagari revenue division.
