= Maheswarnath Mandir =

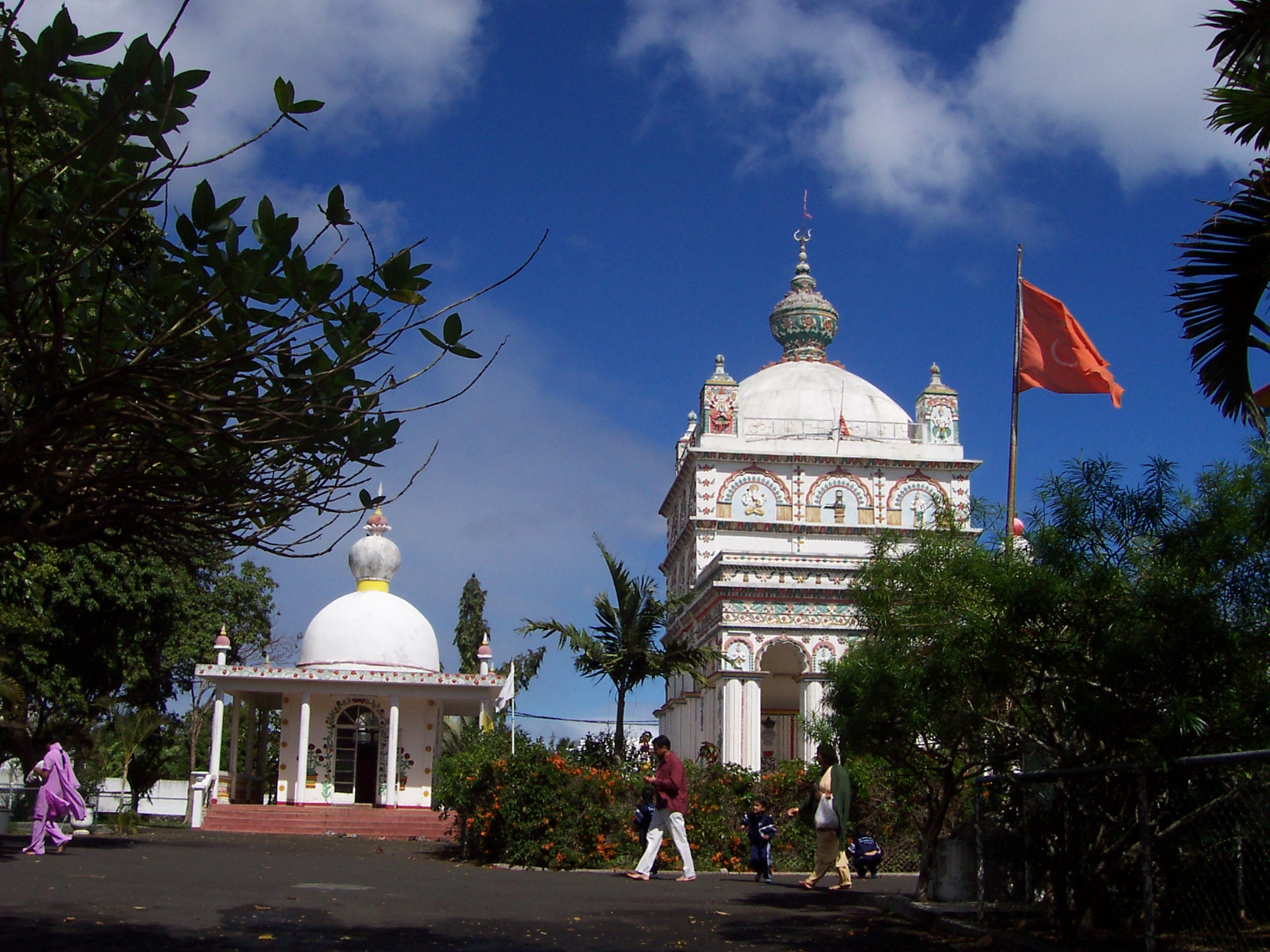
- On the left-the Nataraja temple, on the right-the main temple

Religion
- Affiliation: Hinduism
- District: Pamplemousses
- Deity: Lord Shiva, Goddess Durga & Lord Krishna/Jagannath
- Festivals: Maha Shivratree, Durga Puja & Krishna Janmashthami

Location
- Location: Triolet, Pamplemousses District, Mauritius
- Country: Mauritius
- Interactive map of Maheswarnath Mandir
- Coordinates: 20°02′32.8″S 57°33′08.6″E

Architecture
- Type: Bengal architecture
- Founder: Pandit Shri Sanjibonlall Ramsoondur
- Creator: Pandit Shri Sanjibonlall Ramsoondur
- Established: 1888
- Temple: 7

Maheswarnath Mandir (locally known as "Grand Shivala Triolet") is a Hindu temple located in the town of Triolet, Mauritius. The presiding deity of the temple is Lord Shiva (one of his epithets is Maheshwarnath, meaning the great Lord). The temple was founded in 1888 by Pandit Shri Sajeebunlall Ramsoondur, who came from Calcutta. The temple is famous for its association with the first pilgrimage to Ganga Talao, the sacred lake found in the center of Mauritius. The temple is the biggest and one of the oldest Hindu temples on the island along with the Kovil at Bon Espoir Piton (1830), Sinatambou Kovil at Terre Rouge (1850), Murugan Kovil at Clemencia (1856), the Shivala at Gokoolah (1867), Rameshwarnath Shivala at Terre Rouge (1867) and Jharnath Shivala at l'Aventure (1881). There also old Mandaps and Kalimayes dedicated to Durga and Kali, like the one at Antoinette Phooliyar (around 1840s) and a Durga Mandap at Cinema Casse in Triolet itself (1882).

== History ==
The temple is more than 130 years old. Its founder; Pandit Shri Sanjibonlall Ramsoondur, better known as Pandit Sanjibon, came to Mauritius on April 4, 1866, travelling from Calcutta. Sanjibon was originally from the Indian state Odisha. He came as a peddler but acquired land and wealth during the grand morcellement, which began in 1878. During the 1880s to the 1920s, sugar estates were selling parts of their lands and a great number of Indian immigrants had purchased land around that time. Pandit Sajibon had purchased lands almost equivalent to one third of current Triolet. He became a major landowner – he had 21.73 hectares (53.70 acres) at Terminus, Triolet, of which he donated 4.10 hectares (10.13 acres) to a Hindu society in 1895. Due to his economic independence, intelligence and stature, Pandit Sajibon was respected by all. He was married to Hamrith Boodhoo.

He had acquired the land of Jules Langlois, due to the failure of the sugar factory of Triolet. He then demolished the 90 feet tall chimney of the factory, without knowing he was bypassing the laws concerning the historic monuments of Mauritius. Thereafter, he decided to build Hindu temples at its own expenses and the principal temple would be of the same height as the destroyed chimney.

At that time, the ruins of the sugar factories were often used to make places of worship. The Church of Notre Dame de La Salette is a case in Grand Baie. The other one is the temple of Triolet which was built on the ruins. The building was the work of Tamil artisans under the supervision of Mr Goinsamy Maestry. Those artisans had even built the Jummah Masjid in Port Louis and the Sockalingum Meenatchee Ammen kovil at Nicolay road, Port Louis (commonly known as "Kaylasson temple").

Sajibon Pandit, who was very energetic, himself helped in constructing the temple; which lasted from 1888 to 1891.

Images of the deities and priests arrived from India and Sajibon went there to pick them up. When he brought the second "lingam" from Kashi, he organized a "Shobha Yatra"(a religious procession) from Port Louis to Triolet.

After the inauguration of the temple, Pandit Sajibon donated money to the Hindu society for the management of the temple. He gave 4.10 hectares (10.13 acres) of land along with, according to the deed of Mr Baissac, notary. He died on 25 February 1907 and he was cremated in the temple compound. His samadhi is on the right of the temple entrance, under the shade of banyan and frangipani trees, along with the samadhi of his wife, Hamrith Boodhoo.

== The Maheswarnath Temple legend ==
According to a legend, during the temple's construction, a huge pot of gold and silver coins were found buried on the very spot where the temple was being made. It is believed by many that this gold must have belonged to Indian Ocean pirates from the previous century, who used to attack East India Company ships for their gold and other precious goods. The money found was then used for the construction of the temple.

== The first Maha Shivratree Pilgrimage ==
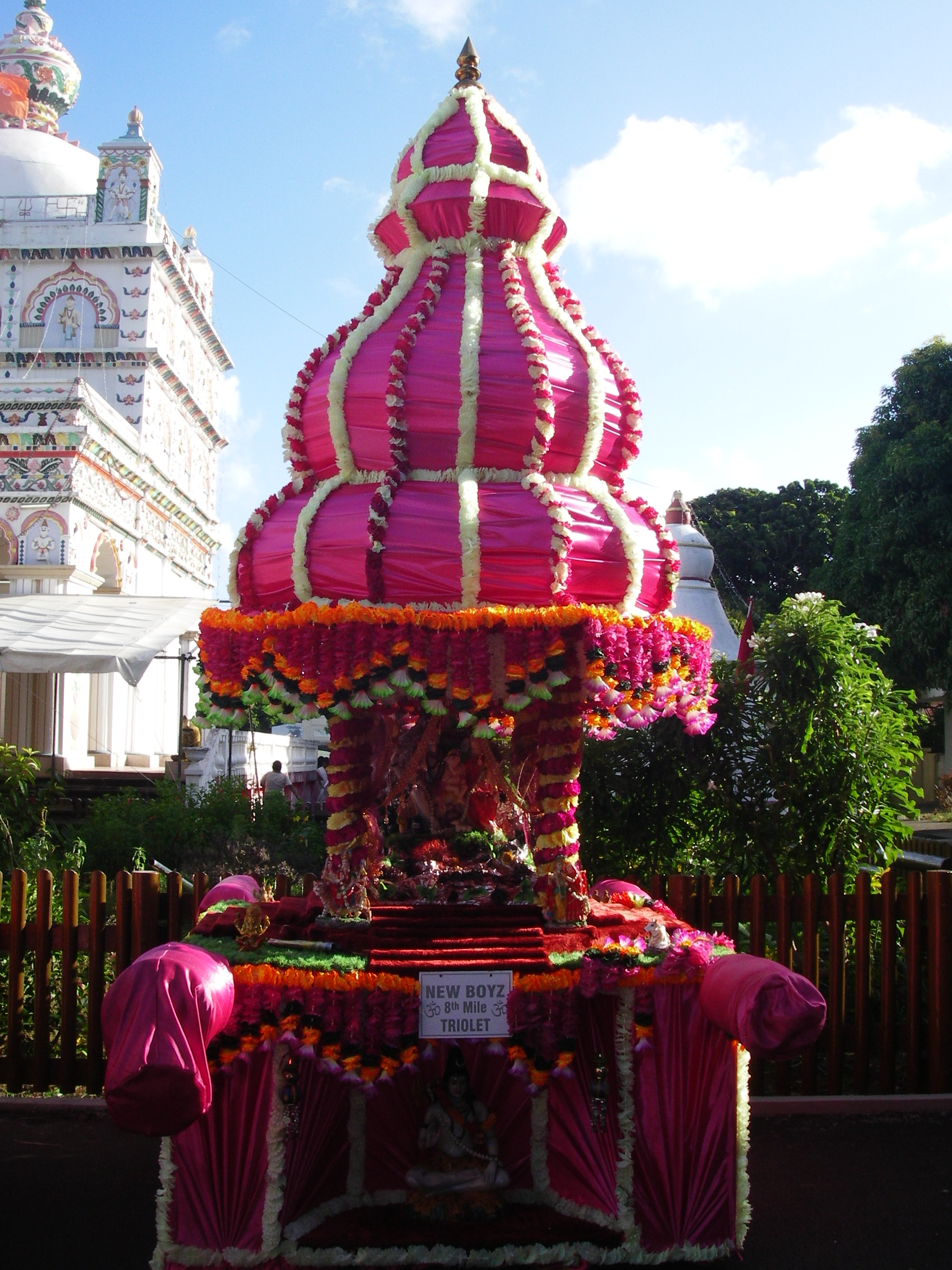
A kanwar in the temple compound on the eve of the Maha shivratree festival

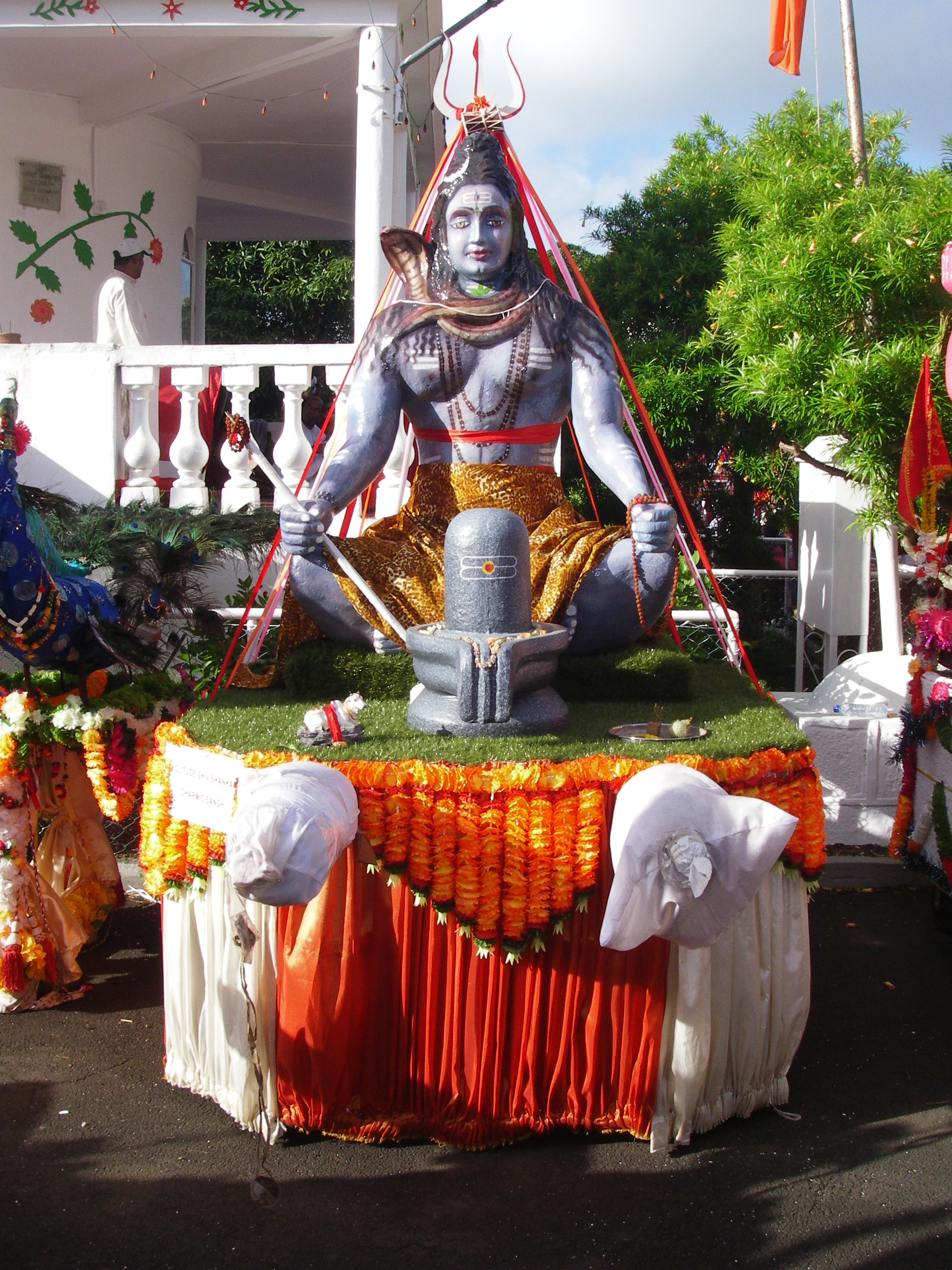
A kanwar in the temple compound on the eve of the Maha shivratree festival

A major event associated with Pandit Shri Sajeebunlall Ramsoondur and the Maheswarnath temple is the beginning of the annual pilgrimage to Grand Bassin. In fact, in 1897 Pandit Shri Jhummon Giri Gossagne Napal, a priest of Bois Pignolet together with Pandit Shri Mohan Prasad Pandey, a priest of Goodlands saw in a dream the water of the lake of Grand Bassin springing from the ‘Jahnvi’, thus forming part of Ganga. The news of the dream spread rapidly and created quite a stir in the Hindu community and also reassured the Hindus about the sacred nature of the island and the futility of being in India at the time of death for Moksha. The following year, Pandit Giri Gossagne and Pandit Sajeebunlall along with nine people from Triolet trekked to Grand Bassin to collect its water to offer to Lord Shiva on the occasion of Maha Shivaratri. The lake was then known as Pari Talao and became the equivalent of the holy Ganges in India. Thereafter, people from all around the island started to follow this tradition of going for a tirthyatra (pilgrimage) with a kanwar (a bamboo structure covered with fabrics and decorated with ornaments; it also enshrines images of Hindu deities) to Ganga Talao to collect its holy water. The holy water is then offered to Lord Shiva in the local temples of their respective villages. This pilgrimage remains an integral part of the Maha Shivratree festival and this tradition is unique to Mauritius.

== Architecture ==
The temples shows influences from Bengal architecture which at that time had absorbed British influences in colonial India. The temples also seem to be influenced by the Deulas of Orissa, later assimilated into Bengali architecture. The temple dome shows Buddhist influences in its profile, as originally North Indian Hindu temples had a Shikhara shaped like a mountain peak to signify the divine Meru. Domes like this one were also used on Buddhist Stupa prevalent in India since the time of emperor Ashoka, or around the third century BCE. However they were inaccessible mounds and it is with the arrival of Persian architecture through the Khalji dynasty that true free standing domes at major scales developed in India. They were later further developed by the Mughals. As such, the dome of the temple has Persian influences as at the time it was built the architecture had already been well syncretised and had become common in Indian architecture. The main temple, the Vishnu temple, the Devi temple and the Nataraja temple all have domes. As well, domes are a common feature in the old Hindu temples of Mauritius. The main temple is a variation of the panchayatna temple whereby a central shrine is dedicated to the main deity with 4 subsidiary deities in each corner. The early panchayatna temples had 5 separate entities with the central shrine being most prominent. Here the style happens on a single building, the principal deity is towered by the main dome and an ornate amalaka stylised with floral designs topped with the kalash and trishul. The four subsidiary spires rise from the four corners and have images of deities like Brahma and Kartikeya. This style of temple is also known as the Pancharatna style temple in West Bengal whereby the style is named by the number of pinnacles or ratnas the temples have. If it has one ratna, it's called Ekratna and it can go up till nine in which case it's called Navratna as the Dakshineshwar Kali temple is known. The veranda attached to the main temple resembles the thakur-dalan, which is common in the old houses of Calcutta, probably an influence from the British as it's a common feature in the zamindar mansions. The thakur-dalan is a veranda where the deity of Durga is invoked during the Durga Puja in West Bengal, Orissa and parts of Bihar. This also seems to be the case for the Vishnu temple on the right. The main temple is decorated with images of various Hindu deities and floral designs. Since its construction, the temple is always painted white while the sculptures and the floral designs are colorful, in contrast to the white background. The central part of the main temple is dedicated to lord Shiva in the form of the shiv ling and the four corners his wife, goddess Parvati, their sons; lord Ganesha and lord Kartikeya and another form of Shiva; lord Bhairava. Facing the shiv ling is Nandi, the gate-keeper. Next to the principal temple are two smaller ones dedicated to goddess Lakshmi and lord Nataraja. Another temple is dedicated to Lakshmi Narayan and their various incarnations. There is also a Hanuman temple in addition to a temple enshrining lord Jagannath with his siblings, goddess Kali in Dakshineshwar stance, goddess Saraswati, goddess Durga and her nine forms. The temple dedicated to Lord Jagannath also suggest the Odia origin of Pandit Sajibon, as the cult of Jagannath has a prominent place in Orissa. In the center of the temple complex is a smaller temple enshrining the smaller lingam that Pandit Sajibon brought from Kashi and hence the temple is named Kashi Vishwanath.

== Photo gallery ==
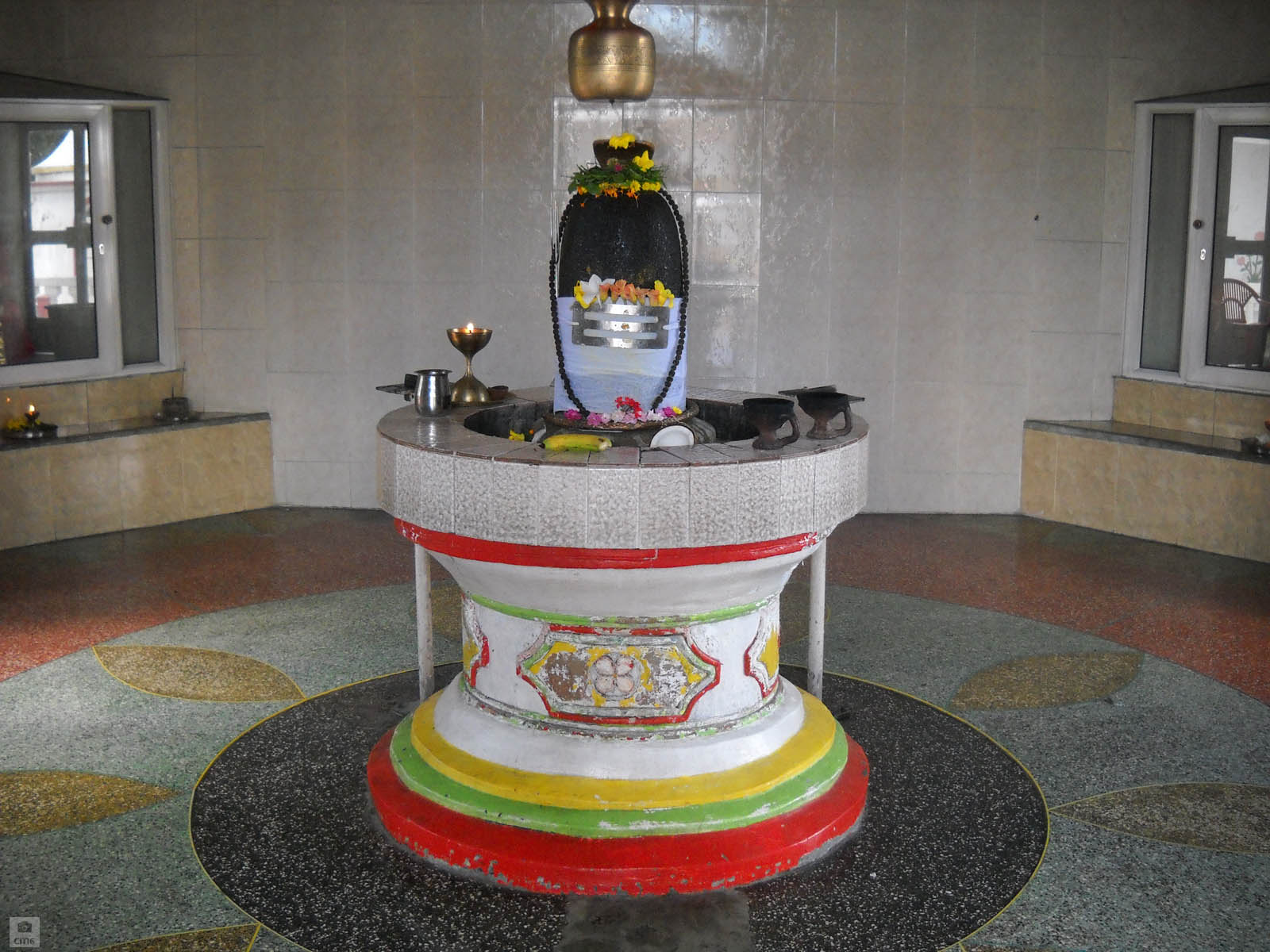
The Shiv Ling in the main temple.

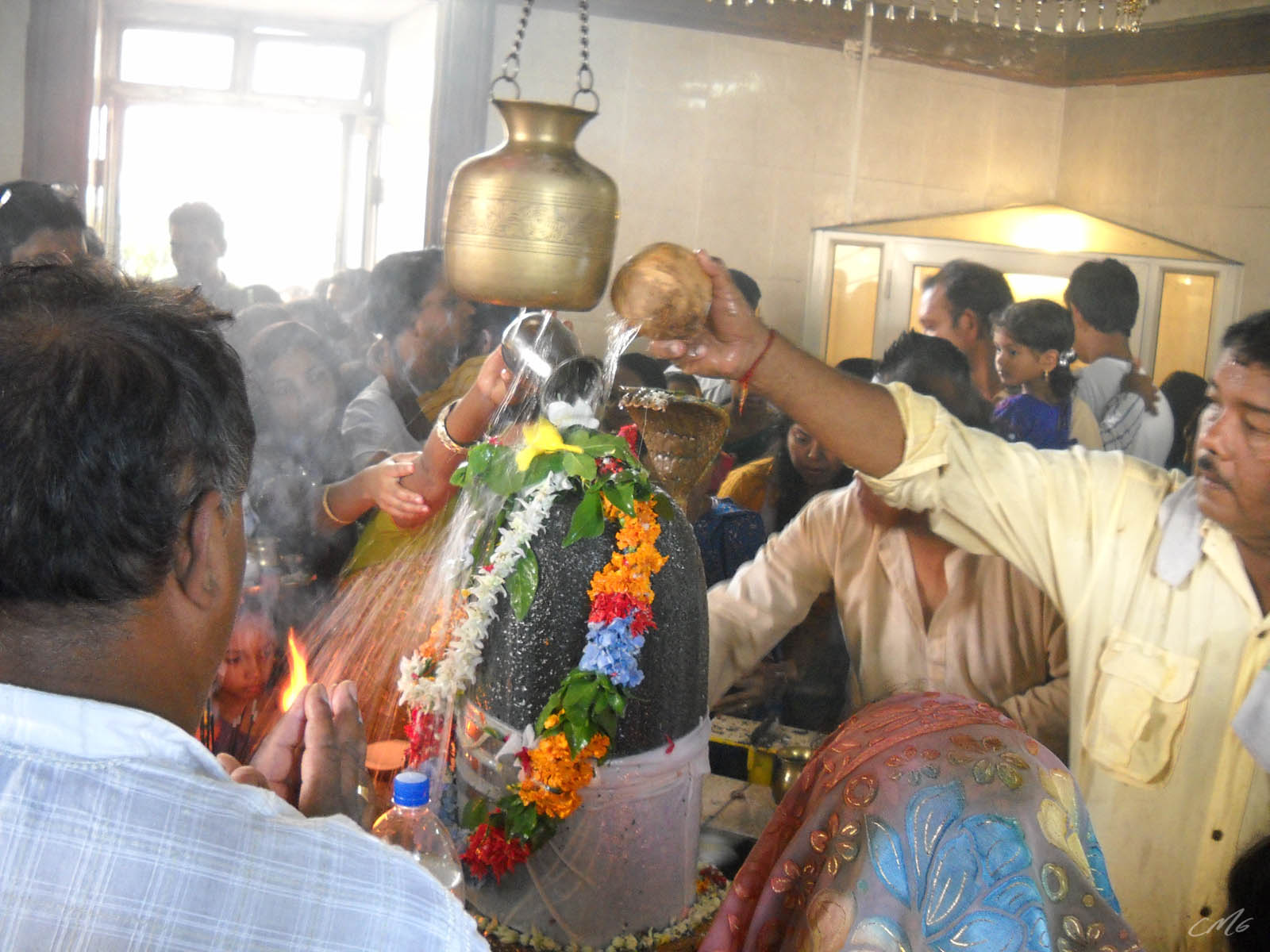
Devotees offering prayers on the Mahashivratree festival.

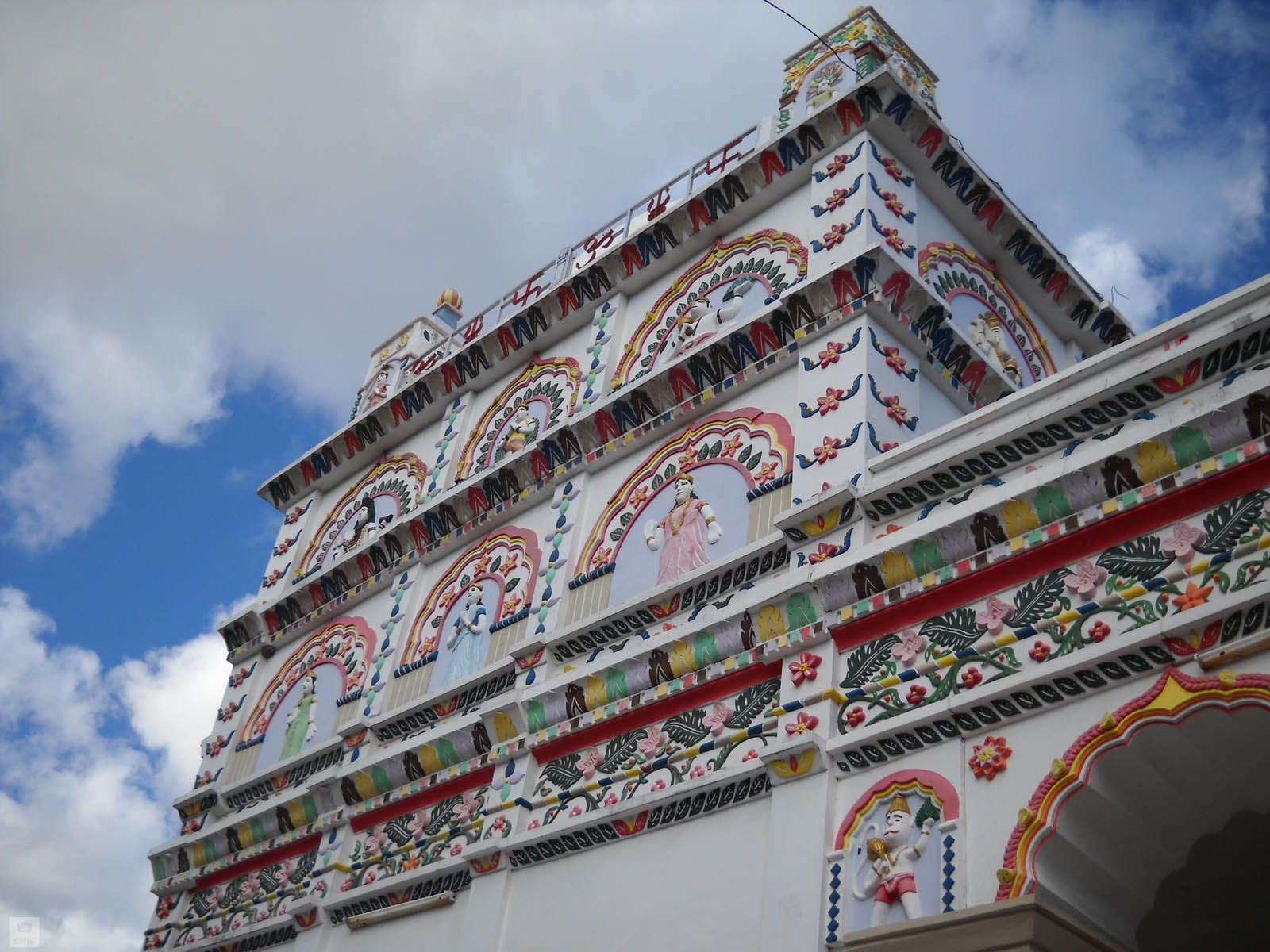
Details on the outer walls of the main temple.

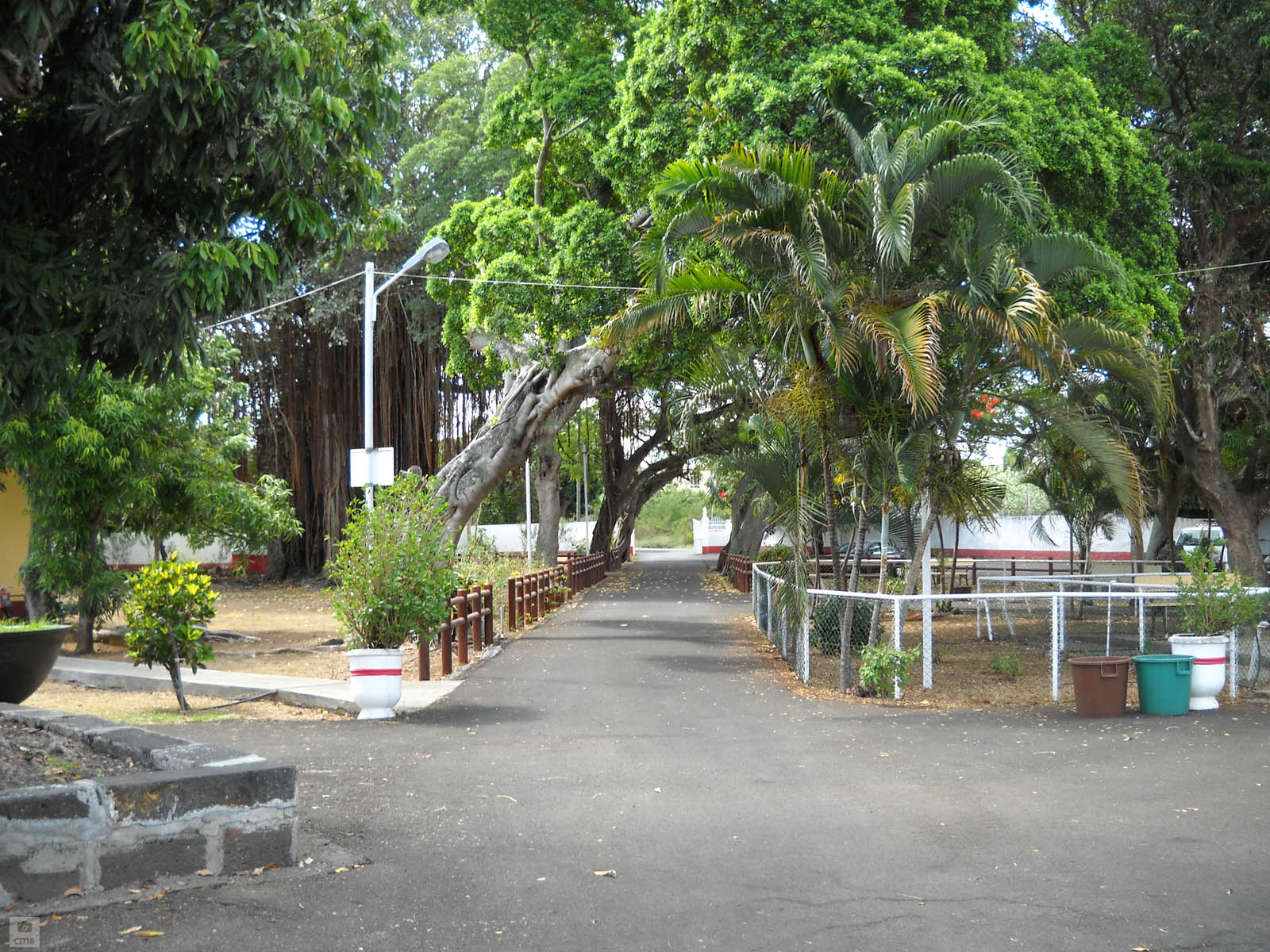
Entrance to the temple.

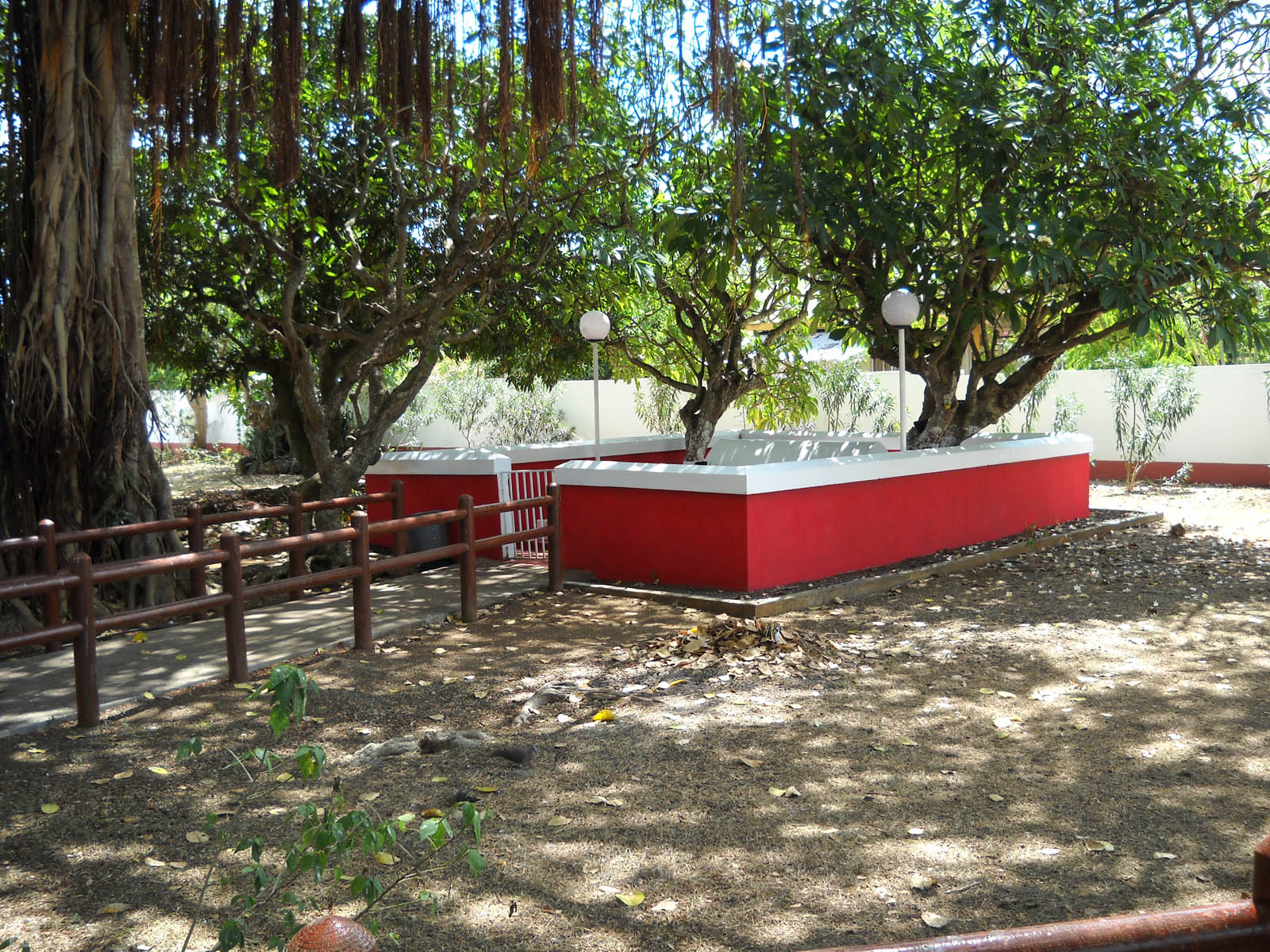
The samadhi of the temple founder, Pandit Sanjibonlall and that of his wife Hamrith Boodhoo, near the entrance.

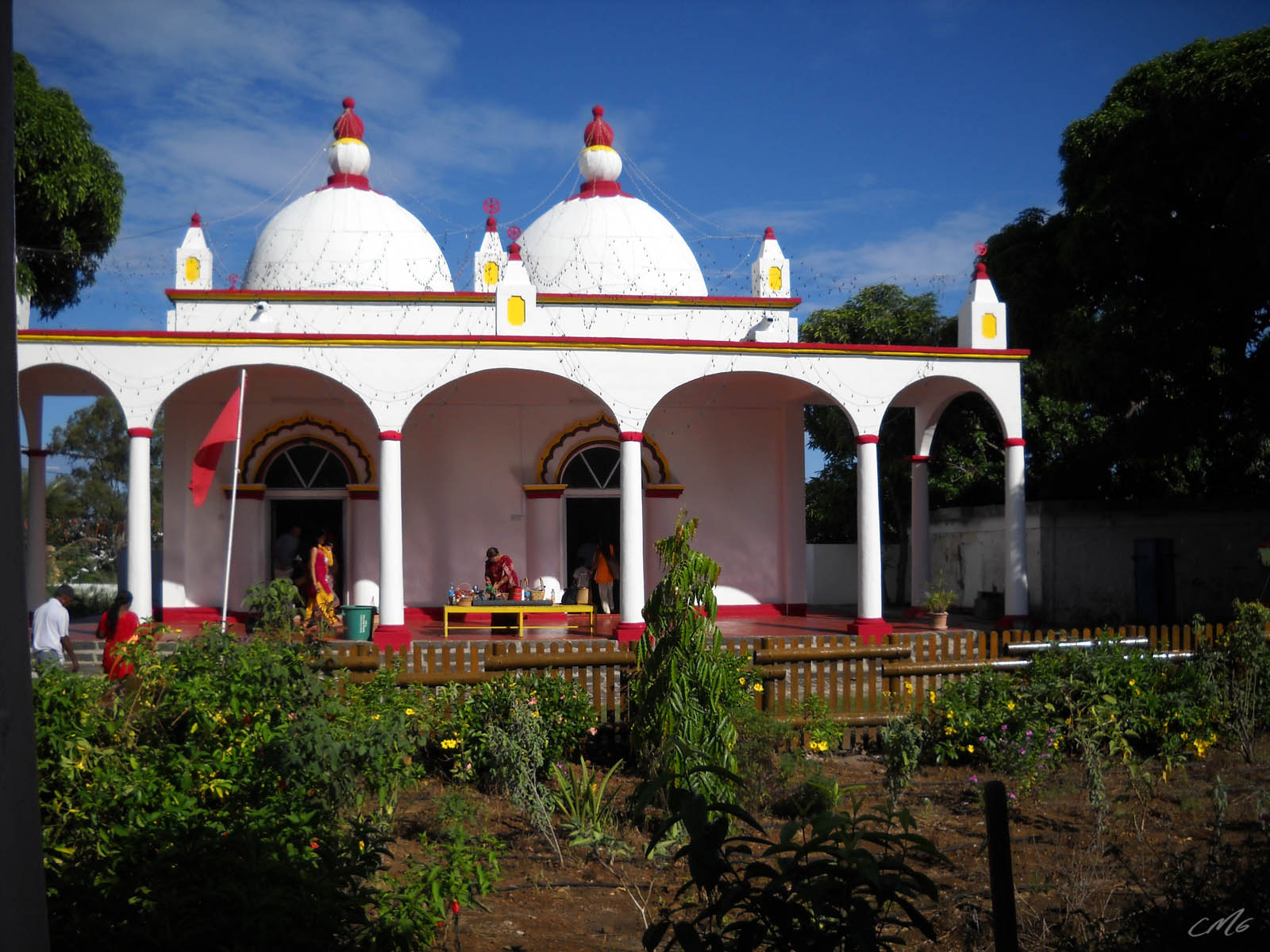
The Vishnu temple.

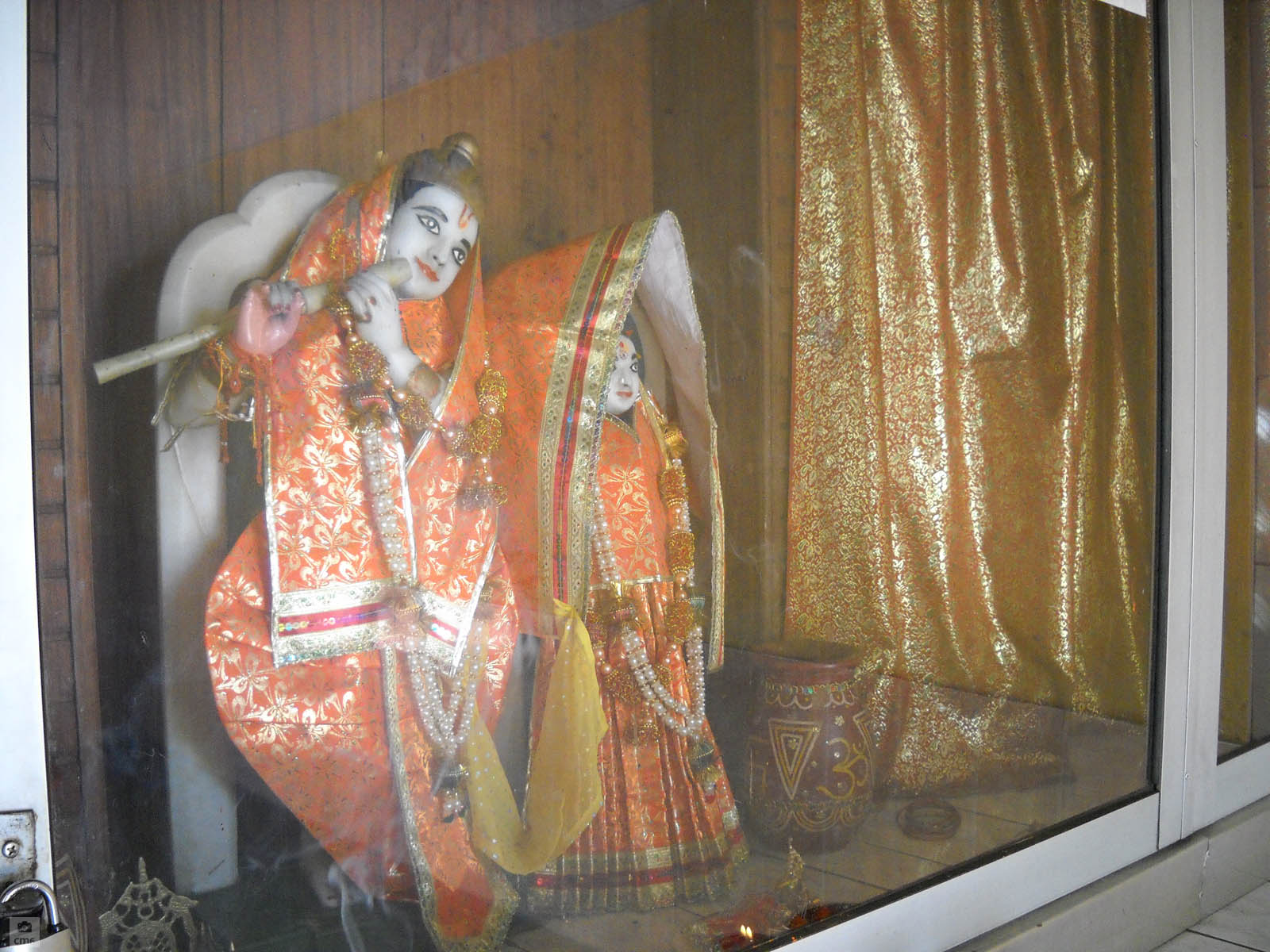
Radha Krishna deity.

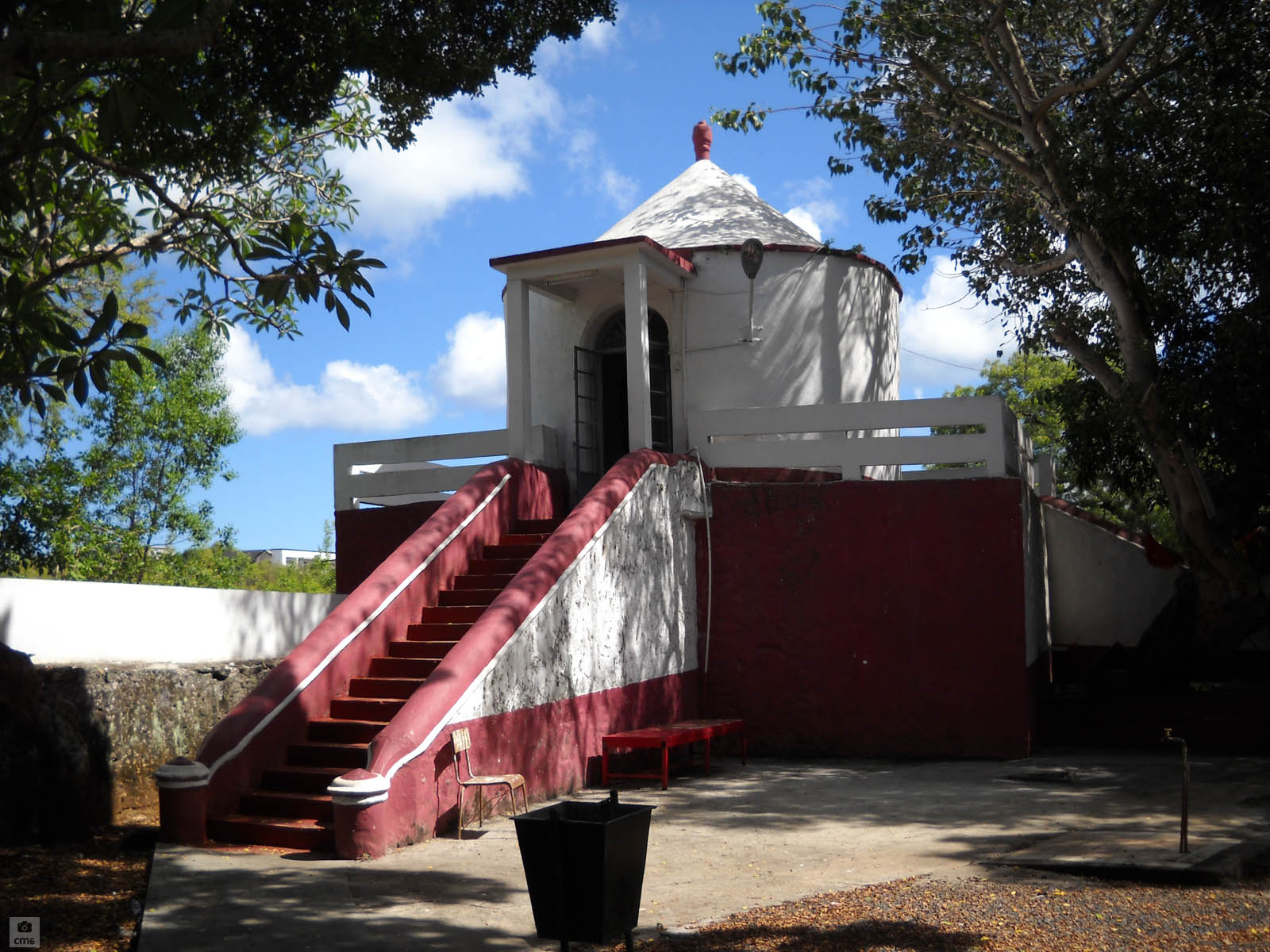
The old Hanuman temple on an elevated platform.

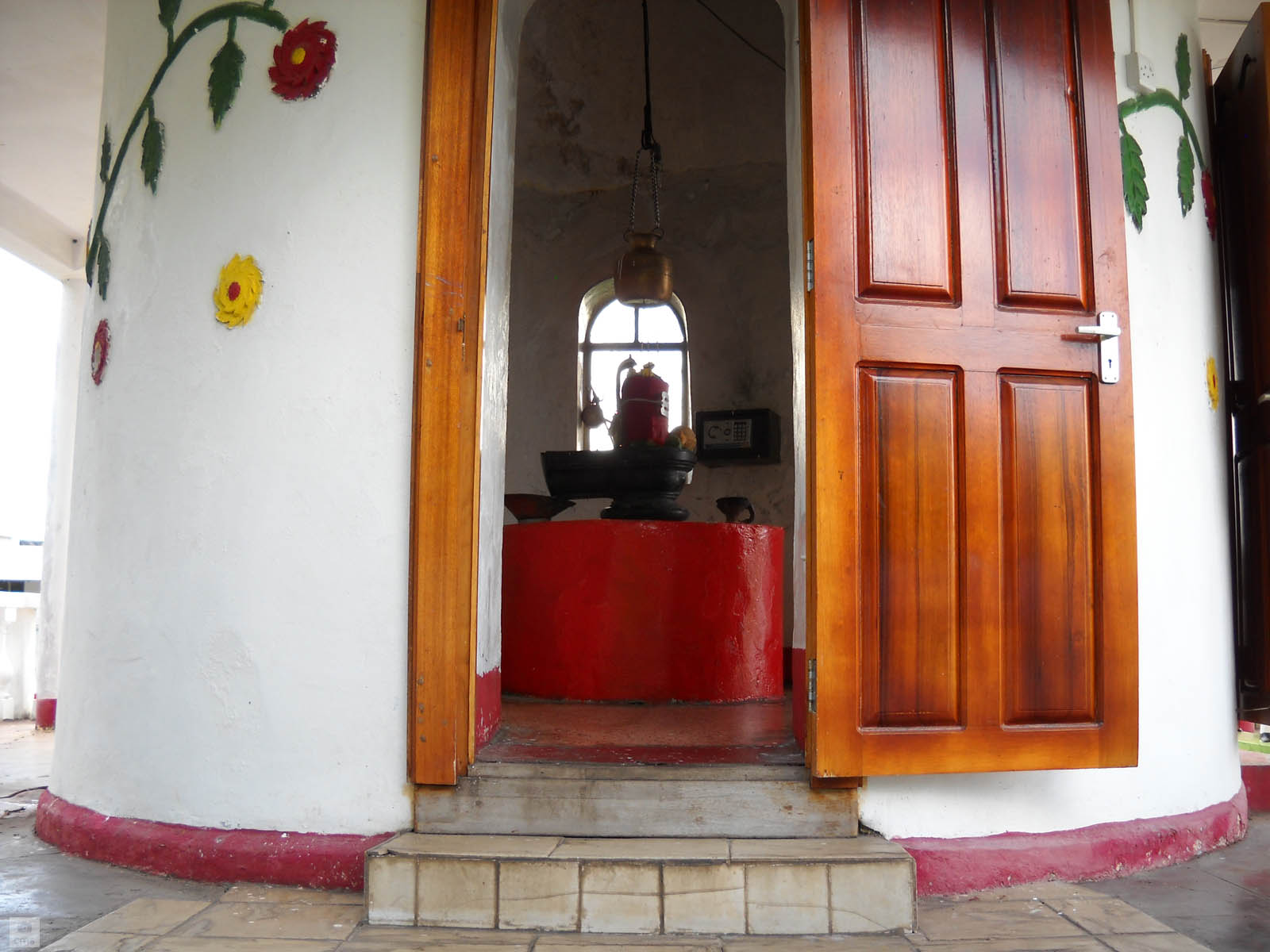
The Kashi Vishwanath temple enshrining a smaller Shiv Ling.

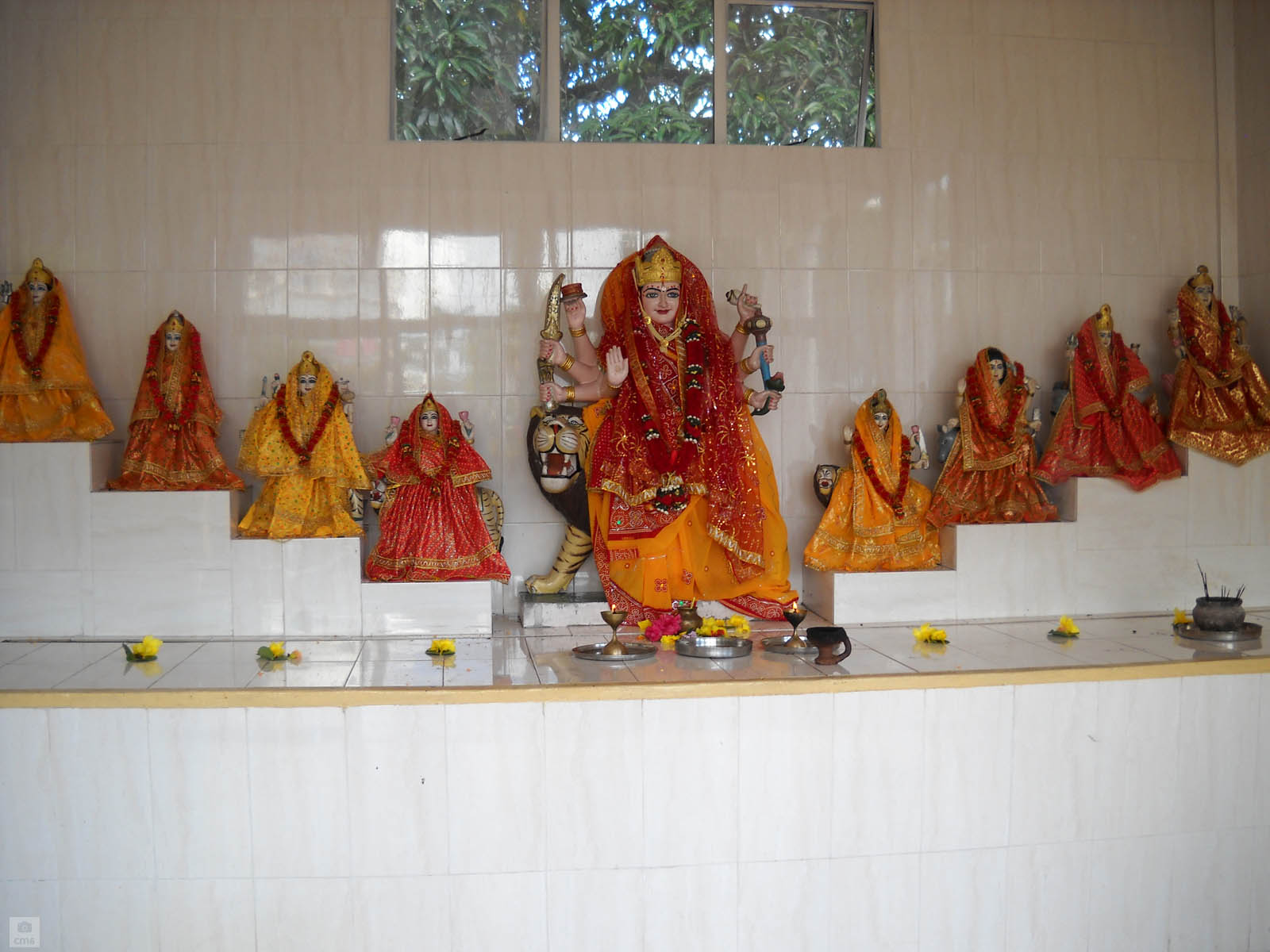
Goddess Durga and her incarnations.
