= Veerullapadu =

- Village
- Interactive map of Veerullapadu
- Location in Andhra Pradesh, India Veerullapadu (India)
- Coordinates: 16°49′11″N 80°23′53″E
- Country: India
- State: Andhra Pradesh
- District: NTR
- Mandal: Veerullapadu mandal
- Elevation: 49 m (161 ft)

Population (2011)
  - Total: 2,723

Languages
  - Official: Telugu
- Time zone: UTC+5:30 (IST)
- Vehicle registration: AP 16

Veerullapadu is a village in Veerullapadu mandal of NTR district in the Indian state of Andhra Pradesh.
