= Jagannath, Bajura =

Coordinates: 29.45°N 81.67°E

Jagannath, Nepal जगन्नाथ
- City
- Interactive map of Jagannath, Nepal
- Country: Nepal
- Zone: Seti Zone
- District: Bajura District

Population (1991)
  - Total: 2,612
  - Religions: Hindu
- Time zone: UTC+5:45 (Nepal Time)

Jagannath, Nepal is a village in Bajura District in the Seti Zone of north-western Nepal. At the time of the 1991 Nepal census it had a population of 2,612 and had 538 houses in the village.
