= Jugnauth =

Jugnauth is a surname. Notable people with the surname include:

- Anerood Jugnauth (1930–2021), Mauritian politician and longest-serving Prime Minister of Mauritius
- Ashock Jugnauth (born 1953), Mauritian politician and half-brother of Anerood Jugnauth
- Kobita Jugnauth, wife of Pravind Jugnauth
- Lall Jugnauth (1920–1970), Mauritian politician and cousin of Anerood Jugnauth
- Pravind Jugnauth (born 1961), Mauritian politician, Prime Minister of Mauritius from 2017 to 2024 and son of Anerood Jugnauth
- Sarojini Jugnauth, wife of Anerood Jugnauth
