= Jagannath, Dailekh =

Jagannath, Bheri जगन्नाथ
- Village development committee
- Location in Nepal
- Coordinates: 28.78°N 81.88°E
- Country: Nepal
- Zone: Bheri Zone
- District: Dailekh District

Population (1991)
  - Total: 2,165
- Time zone: UTC+5:45 (Nepal Time)

Jagannath is a village development committee in Dailekh District in the Bheri Zone of western-central Nepal. At the time of the 1991 Nepal census, it had a population of 2,165 people living in 413 individual households.
