= Trikut Hill =

Hilly plateau in Jharkhand, India

Trikut Hills
- त्रिकुट पहाड़
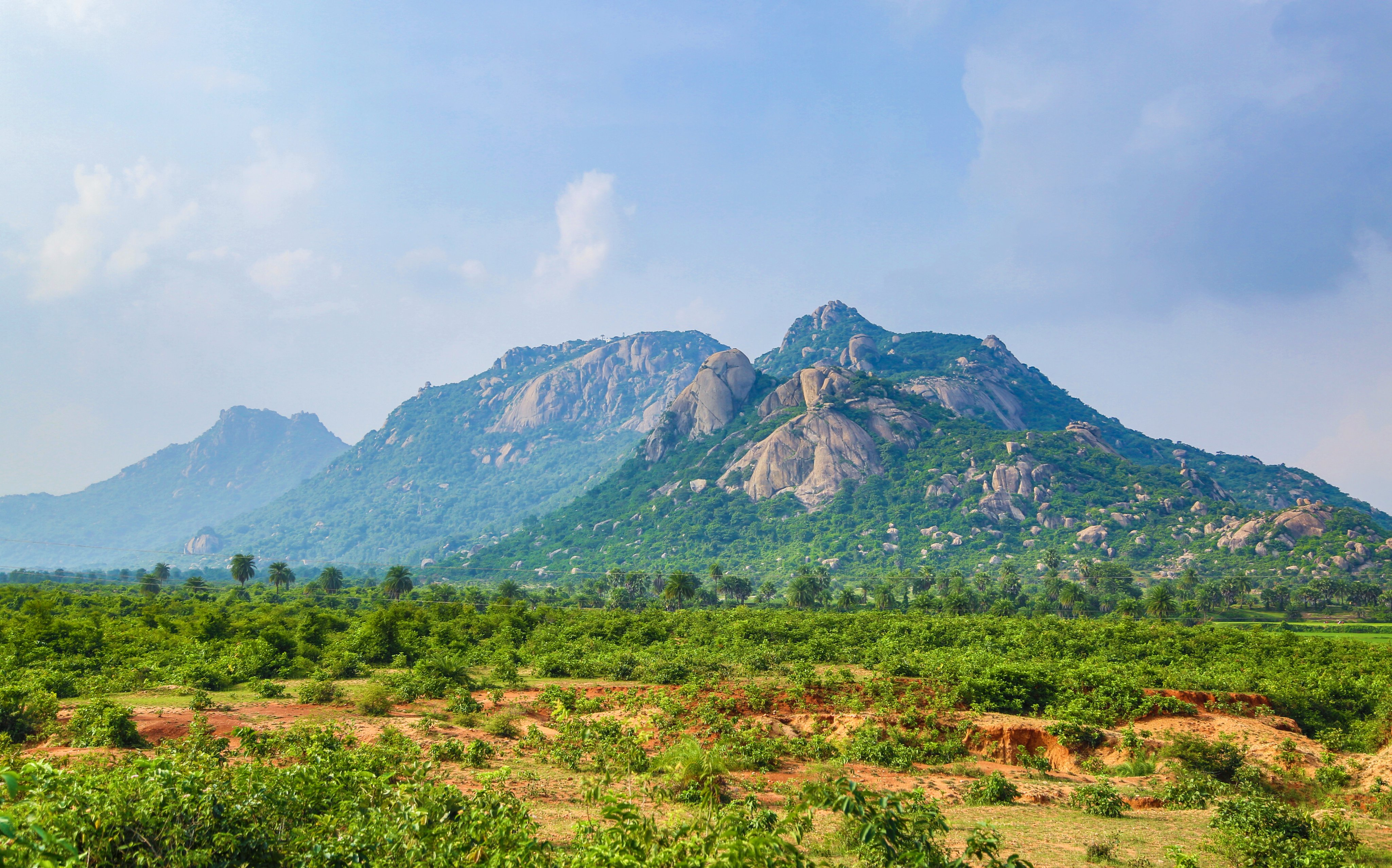
- Trikut Hills seen from the surrounding plains

Highest point
- Elevation: 753 m (2,470 ft)

Geography
- Location within Jharkhand
- Location: Deoghar
- Country: India
- State: Jharkhand
- Rivers: Mayurakshi river
- Range coordinates: 24.499°N 86.837°E

Trikut Pahar, Trikut Hills or Trikutachal, is a Hindu pilgrimage site located approximately 15 km from Deoghar, in the Mohanpur Block of Deoghar District, Jharkhand, India, en route to Dumka. Named for its three prominent peaks ("tri-" meaning three), the hill rises to an elevation of 2,470 feet. Revered for its spiritual significance, Trikut Hill attracts devotees and visitors seeking its serene landscapes and panoramic views, making it a cherished natural and cultural landmark in Jharkhand.

A ropeway previously facilitated access to the summit to the top of the hill, but operations were halted following a cable car accident in April 2022 that resulted in three fatalities. Plans to repair and restart the ropeway are underway, although no reopening date has been confirmed. Visitors can currently reach the peak using stairs.

During the monsoon season (July-September), Trikut Pahar is often shrouded in clouds, with seasonal waterfalls and streams accentuating its natural surroundings. From the summit, visitors can enjoy expansive views, including the solar energy installations at Tapovan, (First solar energy hub in Jharkhand) The hill remains an important destination for Hindu pilgrims and tourists, valued for its spiritual heritage and scenic landscape.

Tapovan, which is known for the temple of Taponath Mahadev and Hanuman, is at a distance of 10km from Trikut Hill. River Mayurakshi, which flows through several districts of the state of West Bengal and finally joins River Hooghly, originates from Trikut Hill.

== Religious importance ==
Trikut Hill (त्रिकुट पर्वत) is one of the many Hindu pilgrimages located 15 km away from Deoghar.

As per the Hindu script Ramayana, Ravana, the king of Lanka (now Sri Lanka) was the most revered devotee of Shiva. In order to impress the Lord of Destruction, the king performed intense penance for several thousand years and sung songs in praise of him. Pleased with his utter devotion and the melody of his hymns, Shiva asked him for a wish. Ravana, however, wished for the Lord to accompany him to Lanka, stunning all the other Hindu gods and goddesses. Shiva though was calm and agreed to go with him but in the form of Shiva linga and on one condition. If ever Ravana, for any reason during the journey, keeps the Shivlinga at any other place, then the lingam will be established there itself for eternity can never be uprooted ever again. The Lankeshwar giddily accepted it and began with the journey. However, in the middle of his voyage, Ravana had this sudden urge to relieve himself. His eyes fell on the Trikut Hill where he landed at the top, hence one of the points on the Trikut Hill is named as Ravana's Helipad. The perplexed King, recalling Shiva's condition, tries to search for any signs of life which could for the time being hold the lingam but failed. Lastly, he turned into a giant to have a wider view of the area and saw a young boy in the fields of Deoghar with his cattle and requested for help. The boy, who was in fact a carnation of Lord Vishnu, agreed but only on the condition of Ravana coming back to take the possession of the Linga after 3 calls. The helpless King agreed again and proceeded with his business. But since the Ganges was flowing inside him, it took longer than expected. Several hours later when Ravana came back to take back the Shivlinga, he became furious as the boy had left already with the Lingam kept on the ground. Ravana tried everything to uplift ut again but true to Shiva's words, the establishment had already been done. Exhausted and frustrated, Ravana punches on the Linga, rooting it further into the ground and leaves. That is the reason why the Deoghar Shivlinga is called as Ravaneshwar Shivlinga.

There are three peaks of the Trikut Hill named after the three Hindu Gods, Bramha, Vishnu and Shiva. Out of the three, only one peak is open for tourists.

== Cable car accident ==
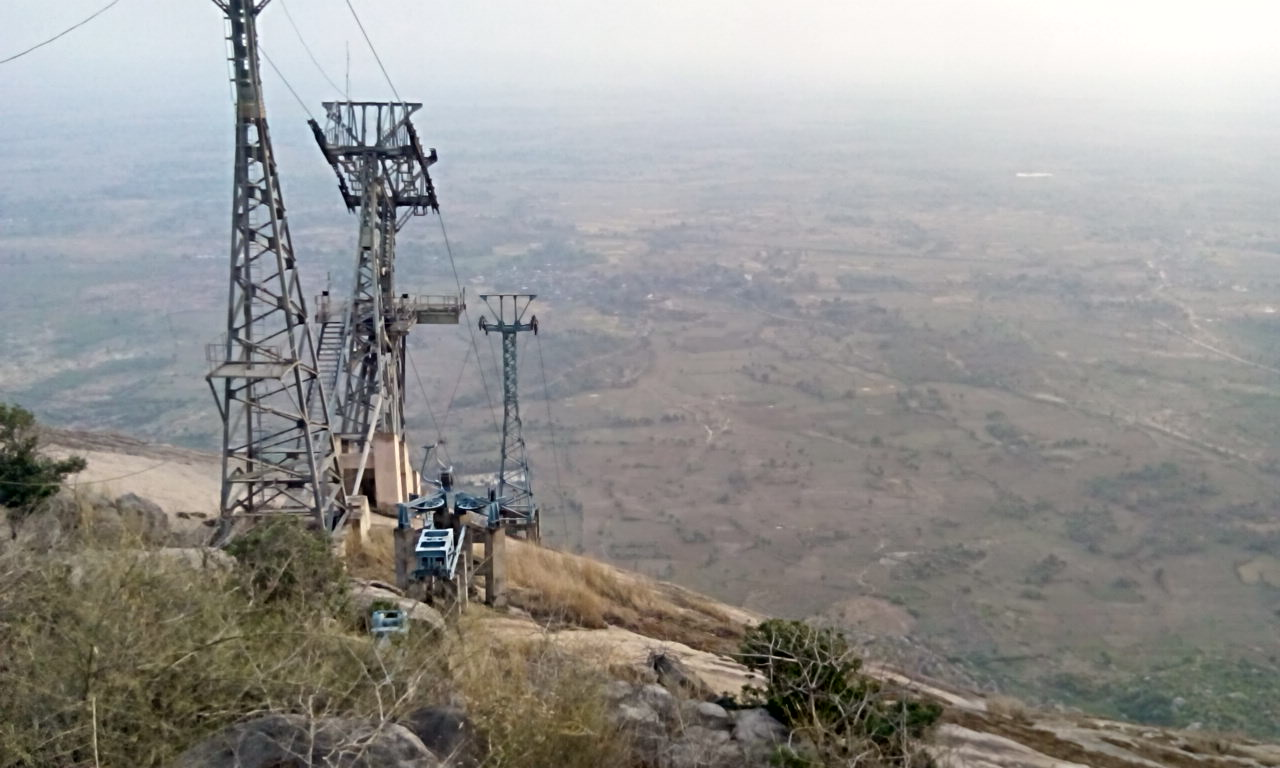
The ropeway in 2015

On 10 April 2022, a cable-car collision was reported at Trikut Hill. At least three people were killed and others were injured. Army helicopters were called for rescue. 78 people were trapped, with 28 rescued the same day and the remainder after up to 45 hours.

In April 2023, a report into the accident identified the cause as a "bubble of hydrogen" causing an engine shaft to break, which in turn meant the rope came off the reel. One car fell and the other 23 were trapped in mid air. The report also identified 24 defects that had been ignored by the operator. The operator, which was made to pay ₹25 lakh (US$26,000 or £20,000) ex-gratia to the kin of those deceased shortly after the accident, was later fined ₹9 crore (US$930,000 or £710,000).

In August 2023, the Jharkhand Tourism Development Corporation opened applications for bids to repair the system and return it to operation, which it estimated would cost around ₹5 crore (US$520,000 or £390,000), which was included in the fine levied on the operator.
