= Dumka =

- City
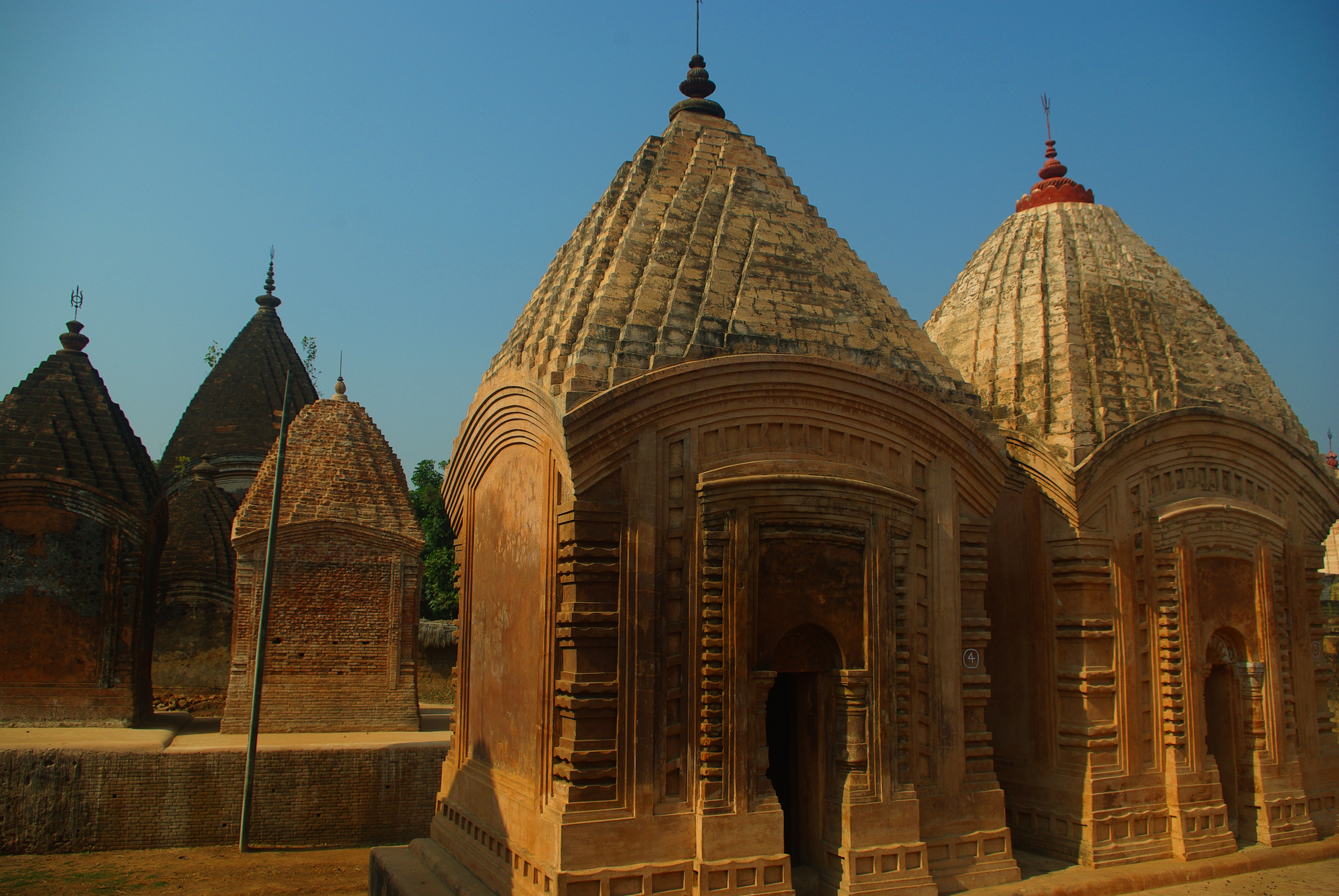
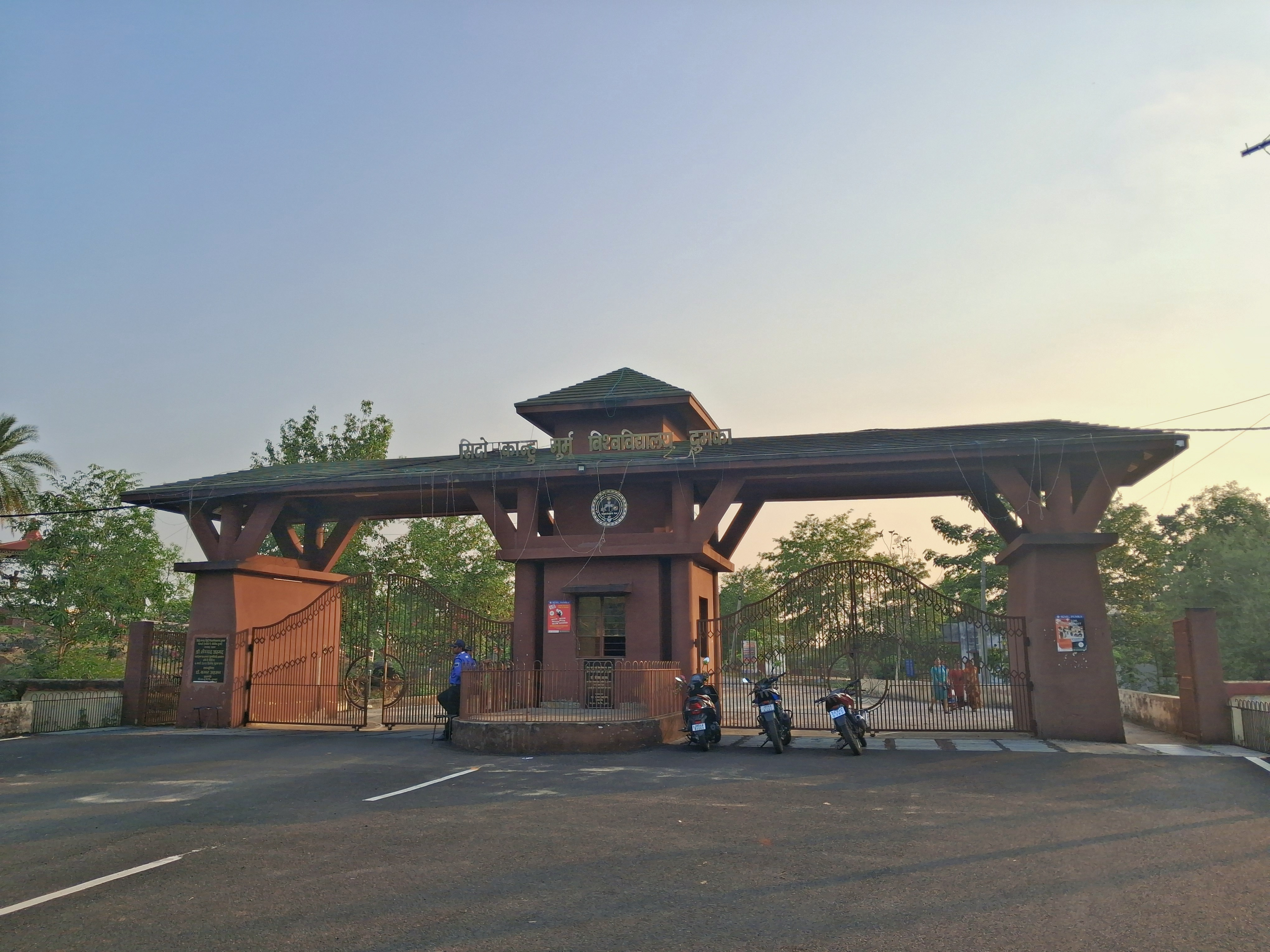
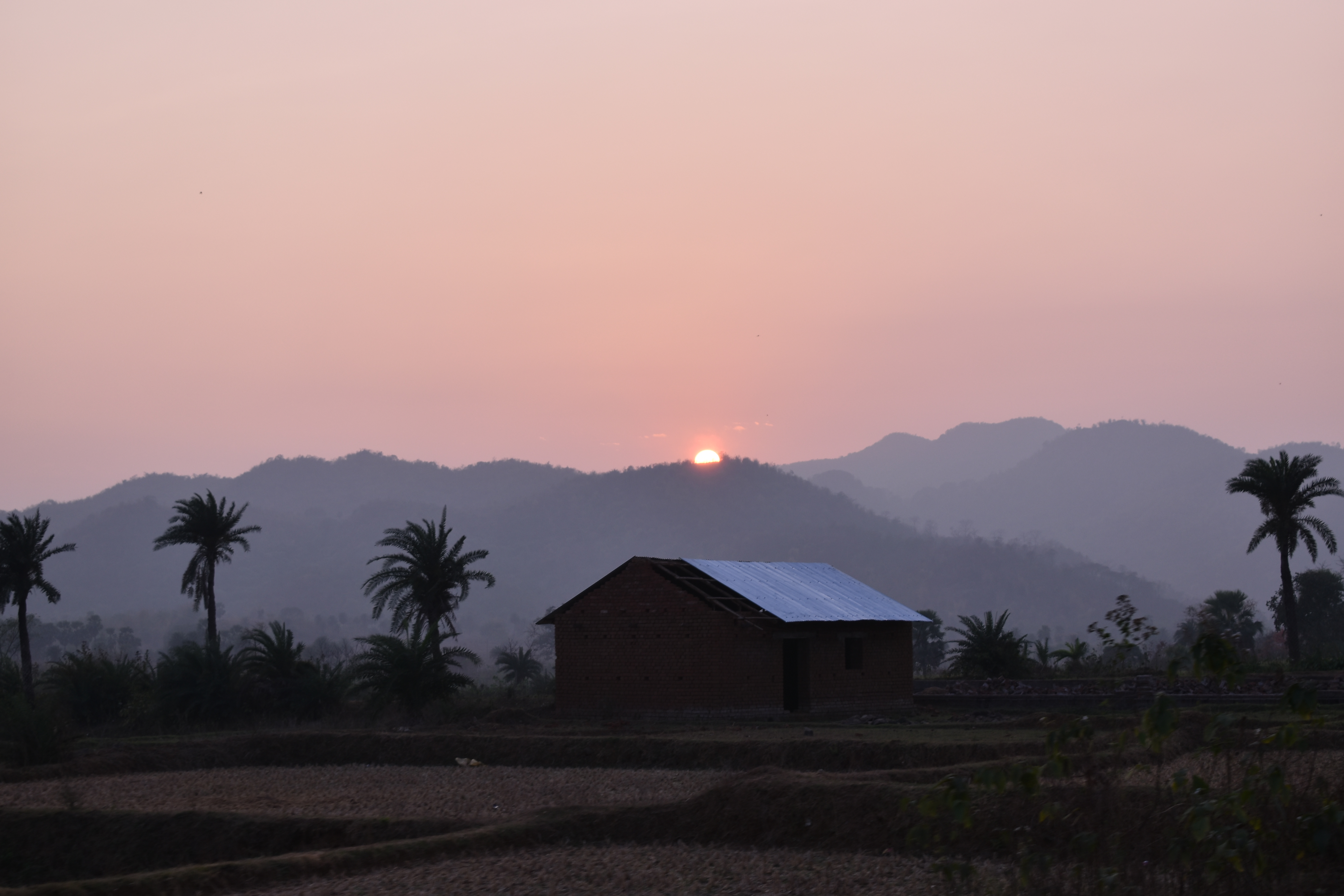
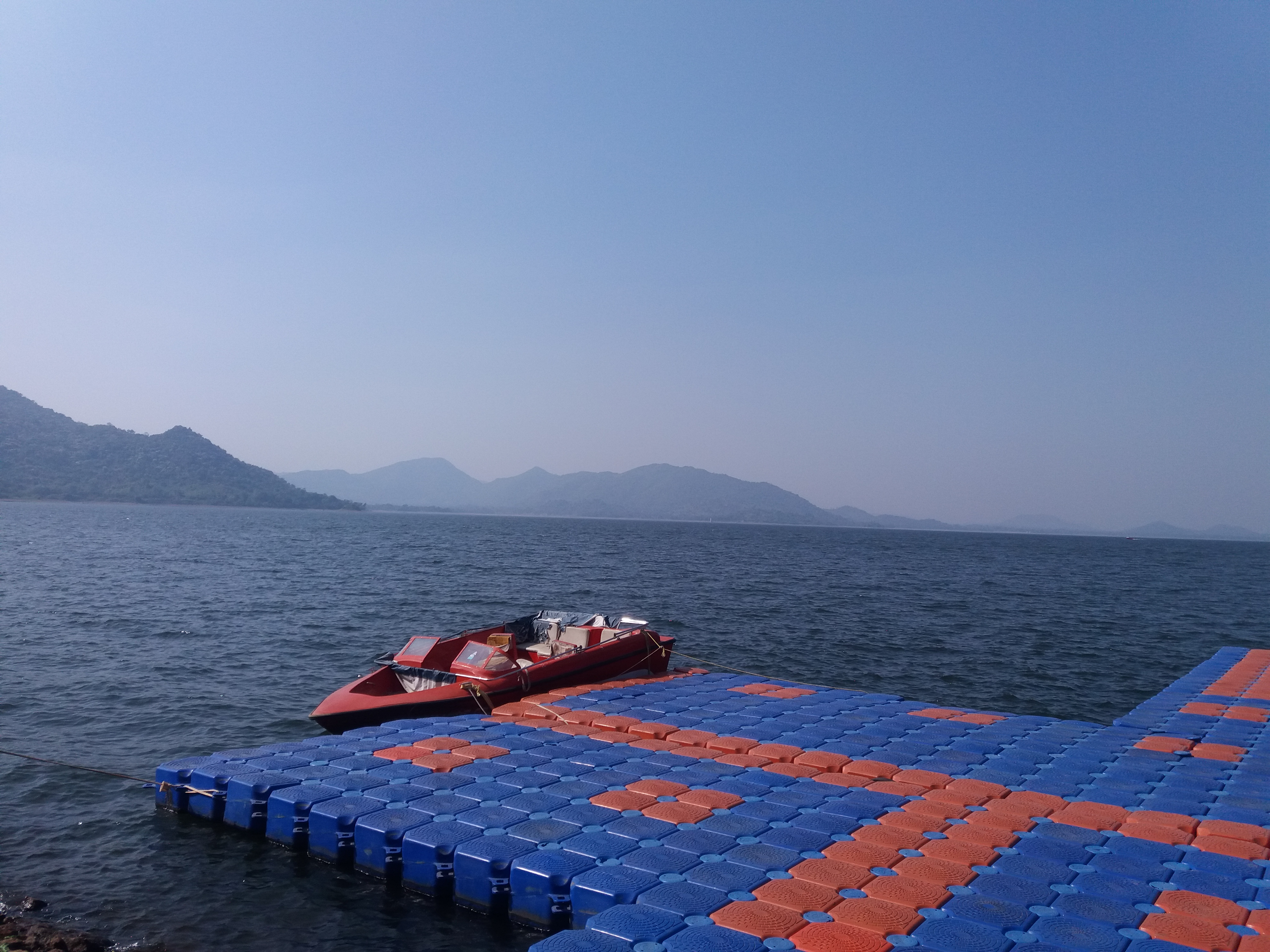
- Terracotta Temples of Maluti, Entrance gate of Sido Kanhu Murmu University, Dumka rural area, Massanjore Dam

- Location in Jharkhand, India Dumka (India)
- Coordinates: 24.42°N 87.34°E
- Country: India
- State: Jharkhand
- District: Dumka
- Division: Santhal Pargana

Government
  - Type: Municipal governance in India
  - Body: Dumka Nagar Parishad
  - Member of Parliament, Lok Sabha: Nalin Soren (JMM)
  - Member of Legislative Assembly, Jharkhand: Basant Soren (JMM)

Area
  - Total: 6.42 km^{2} (2.48 sq mi)
- Elevation: 137 m (449 ft)

Population (2011)
  - Total: 47,584
  - Density: 7,410/km^{2} (19,200/sq mi)

Languages (Note: For language details, see Dumka (community development block)#Language and religion)
  - Official: Hindi, Bengali, Urdu, Santali
  - Regional: Deogharia-Maithili
- Time zone: UTC+5:30 (IST)
- PIN: 814101
- Telephone code: 06434
- Vehicle registration: JH-04
- Sex ratio: 974 ♂/♀
- Website: dumka.nic.in

Dumka, the headquarters of the Dumka district and Santhal Pargana region, is a city in the state of Jharkhand, India. It was made the headquarters of the Santhal Pargana region, which was carved out of the Bhagalpur and Birbhum district after the Santal Hool of 1855. Dumka was carved out of the southern part of Bihar along with 18 other districts on 15 November 2000 to form Jharkhand as the 28th state of India. Dumka is a peaceful and green city and also the sub-capital of Jharkhand. The nearest important cities are Suri and Deoghar.

== Etymology ==
There are two theories on how Dumka got its name. The first one suggests that Dumka's name derives from the Santali word sumk for "shunted" or "small," because during the British Raj, it was a small town compared to Rampurhat and Bhagalpur.

The other is that Dumka derives its name from the Persian word damin-i-koh, which means 'skirts (an edge, border or extreme part) of the hills'.

== History ==
=== Early history ===
The earlier inhabitants of the present-day district of whom there is some record, it appears, were the Paharias (for example, the Maler and Sauria Paharias). The Greek traveler Megasthenes identified these people as Mallis. He referred to the Sauria Paharias as savars of Odisha. Medieval History: Due to inaccessibility of the area caused by the cliffs of the Rajmahal Hills, it was a place of strategic economic importance, with a fort at Teliagarhi. After the 1539 victory of Sher Shah Suri at Chousa, the area fell into the hands of the Afghans, but it was soon lost to the Mughals under Akbar when Hussain Quli Khan was made viceroy of Bengal.

=== British Raj ===
The English representative, Dr. Gabriel Bokgliton, procured a firman from Shah Jahan. Between 1742 and 1751 the area of Dumka close to Rajmahal witnessed frequent inroads by the Marathas under Raghoji Bhosle and Peshwa Balaji Rao. In 1745 Raghoji Bhosle entered Rajmahal via the hills and jungles of Santhal Pargana Division. The early stay of the English was spent in subduing the Paharias. In 1769 Dumka remained a Ghatwali police post under Birbhum District of Bengal. In 1775 Dumka was transferred to Bhagalpur Division. In 1865 Dumka was made an independent district after being carved out of Bhagalpur. In 1872 Dumka was made headquarters of the whole district of Santal Pargana. In 1889 Paul Olaf Bodding started his service in India (Dumka/Benagaria) after Lars Olsen Skrefsrud, and Bodding created the first alphabet for the Santhals. The NELC-church was created as a Lutheran Church in this area - before the Catholics had established a mission in this area at all. In 1902 the first municipality was established. Finally in 1920 Motor cars and buses were introduced.

=== Post Independence ===
Firstly in 1952 The Apostolic Prefecture of Malda was erected. In 1962, it was promoted to the Roman Catholic Diocese of Dumka. Then in 1983 Dumka was made the divisional headquarters of Santhal Pargana. On 15 November 2000 Dumka became the sub-capital of Jharkhand. In 2011 Dumka is connected with the newly built Jasidih-Dumka railway line. In 2012 Intercity express to Ranchi started via Jasidih. Later in 2017 Jharkhand opens pilot training center in Dumka. Finally in 2018 Four-lane road from Dudhani to Tata Showroom constructed.

== Geography ==
Cities, towns and locations in the Deoghar, Dumka and Jamtara districts in Santhal Pargana Division
M: Municipality, CT: census town, R: Rural/ Urban centre, D: Dam,
Owing to space constraints in the small map, the actual locations in a larger map may vary slightly

Dumka is located at 24.27°N 87.25°E. It has an average elevation of 137 metres (449 feet).

== Demographics ==
Historical population
Year	Pop.	±%
1911	5,629	—
1921	7,396	+31.4%
1931	9,471	+28.1%
1941	10,811	+14.1%
1951	13,582	+25.6%
1961	18,720	+37.8%
1971	23,338	+24.7%
1981	31,068	+33.1%
1991	38,096	+22.6%
2001	44,989	+18.1%
2011	47,584	+5.8%
Source: Census of India

As of 2011 India census, Dumka is a Nagar Parishad city in district of Dumka, Jharkhand. The Dumka city is divided into 23 wards for which elections are held every five years. The Dumka Nagar Parishad has population of 47,584 of which 25,364 are males while 22,220 are females as per report released by Census India 2011.

The population of children aged 0-6 is 5371 which is 11.29% of total population of Dumka (Nagar Parishad). In Dumka Nagar Parishad, the female sex ratio is 876 against state average of 948. Moreover, the child sex ratio in Dumka is around 891 compared to Jharkhand state average of 948. The literacy rate of Dumka city is 89.92% higher than the state average of 66.41%. In Dumka, male literacy is around 93.46% while the female literacy rate is 85.87%. As per official census 2011, Hinduism constitutes 79.06% of Dumka's population, followed by Islam at 8.09% and Christianity with 6.54%.

=== Religion and Languages ===
Religion in Dumka (2011)
Religion	Percent
Hinduism	88.25%
Islam	8.46%
Christianity	2.70%
Jainism	0.04%
Others†	0.14%
Distribution of religions †Includes Sikhism (0.06%), Buddhism (0.08%). †† Follwers of Sari Dharam and Sarna are also covered under Hinduism owing to devoid of centrally recognized regious code.

Besides the national official language Hindi, Santali, Urdu and Bengali are mostly spoken followed by regional dialect Khorta.

Here the major religions are:

- Hinduism
- Sari Dharam
- Sarnaism
- Islam
- Christianity
- Jainism

The Catholic minority is served by its own Roman Catholic Diocese of Dumka.

=== Languages ===
Languages spoken in Dumka Town (2011)
1. Hindi (49.6%)
2. Khortha (13.7%)
3. Bengali (12.1%)
4. Bhojpuri (6.42%)
5. Urdu (5.34%)
6. Santali (4.60%)
7. Others (8.55%)

== Climate ==
Dumka has a humid subtropical climate (Köppen climate classification Cwa), with warm, wet summers and mild winters.

Climate data for Dumka
Month	Jan	Feb	Mar	Apr	May	Jun	Jul	Aug	Sep	Oct	Nov	Dec	Year
Record high °C (°F)	33.3 (91.9)	35.6 (96.1)	42.8 (109.0)	46.3 (115.3)	48.3 (118.9)	45.2 (113.4)	41.5 (106.7)	38.6 (101.5)	38.1 (100.6)	37.6 (99.7)	35.8 (96.4)	31.2 (88.2)	48.3 (118.9)
Mean daily maximum °C (°F)	25.9 (78.6)	28.9 (84.0)	34.3 (93.7)	38.4 (101.1)	37.5 (99.5)	35.5 (95.9)	32.7 (90.9)	32.5 (90.5)	32.9 (91.2)	33.0 (91.4)	30.5 (86.9)	27.0 (80.6)	32.4 (90.4)
Mean daily minimum °C (°F)	10.2 (50.4)	13.2 (55.8)	17.4 (63.3)	22.3 (72.1)	23.9 (75.0)	24.7 (76.5)	24.1 (75.4)	23.7 (74.7)	23.6 (74.5)	21.0 (69.8)	16.0 (60.8)	11.1 (52.0)	19.3 (66.7)
Record low °C (°F)	1.7 (35.1)	1.8 (35.2)	5.8 (42.4)	13.8 (56.8)	14.5 (58.1)	17.8 (64.0)	13.4 (56.1)	16.8 (62.2)	13.8 (56.8)	11.8 (53.2)	4.8 (40.6)	2.8 (37.0)	1.7 (35.1)
Average precipitation mm (inches)	9.0 (0.35)	15.0 (0.59)	21.0 (0.83)	35.0 (1.38)	72.0 (2.83)	198.0 (7.80)	343.0 (13.50)	293.0 (11.54)	273.0 (10.75)	116.0 (4.57)	9.0 (0.35)	7.0 (0.28)	1,391 (54.77)
Average rainy days	1.5	2.3	2.2	2.8	6.3	11.3	18.9	16.9	14.1	5.7	1.1	0.8	83.9
Average relative humidity (%)	60	53	47	50	60	73	83	83	81	74	65	62	66
Source: NOAA (1971-1990)

== Economy ==
Industrial areas
Sl. No.	Name of Industrial Area	Land acquired (in hectares)	Land developed (in hectares)	Prevailing Rate Per sq. ft. (in Rs)	No. of plots	No. of allotted plots	No. of vacant plots	No.of units in production
1.	Industrial Area Dumka	6.088	6.088	19.00	13	13	03	10

Industry at a Glance
Sl. No.	Head	Unit	Particulars
1	Registered Industrial Unit	No.	2241
2	Total Industrial Unit	No.	2241
3	Registered Medium &Large Unit	No.	NIL
4	Estimated Avg. No. of daily Worker Employed in small scale industries	No.	38
5	Employment in large and medium Industries	No.	NIL
6	No of Industrial Area	No.	1

== Culture ==
Dumka District contains many Hindu temples, such as Basukinath, Sirshanath, Maluti Mandir, Shiv Pahar and Dharamsthana. Crowds visit these places during the month of Sawan. Hizla Mela (Fair) is organized every year in Hizla and continues for a week. It is a fair of great cultural importance, thousands of people visit during the fair.

== Politics ==
The first Chief Minister of Jharkhand, Babulal Marandi, hailed from Dumka constituency. In 2000, when Jharkhand was carved out of Bihar, NDA came to power in Jharkhand with Marandi as the Chief Minister.

Shibu Soren is another politician who is considered to be one of the founders of Jharkhand Mukti Morcha (JMM) and has a temporary residence in Dumka. Hemant Soren, the current Chief Minister of Jharkhand is the son of Shibu Soren.

== Education ==
There are various Higher Secondary schools in Dumka:

- St. Teresa Girls School
- Sido Kanhu High School
- +2 Zila School
- National School
- Govt. Girls School
- Dumka Central School

Some reputed schools which provide secondary level education are:

- Decent children school, Dumka (Phasiadangal, Dumka)
- North Valley International School,
- St. Joseph's High School
- Bal Bharti School

Other schools include Ananda Marg School (Kurwa), Modern Sainik School, Green Mount Academy and New Life Academy at Kathikund.

To improve academic performance in government schools District administration of Dumka launched Sampurna Shiksha Kavach for students of grade 9 to grade 12 in following schools:

- +2 HS KATHIKUND
- +2 HS MASALIYA
- +2 HS JAMA
- RANI SONAWATI HS
- EKALAVYA MODEL RES. SCH KATIJORIA
- +2 OBC RES. GIRLS HS
- CM School of Excellence Girls, Dumka
- +2 UHS BUNIYADI GANDO
- PLUS 2 ST HS INDERWANI
- +2 RK HS SARAIYHAT
- +2 HS RAGHUNATHPUR
- +2 UHS TALJHARI
- +2 HS BENAGARIA
- +2 HS THARIHAT KUSIAM
- +2 UHS CHAPAKANDAR
- KGBV KATHIKUND
- +2 UHS MOHANPUR
- KGBV SARAIYAHAT
- KGBV JAMA
- +2 RK HS SHIKARIPARA
- NATIONAL SCHOOL DUMKA
- MODEL SCHOOL MASALIYA
- MODEL SCHOOL SARAIYAHAT
- +2 HS SAHARA
- +2 RK HS JARMUNDI
- MODEL SCHOOL SHIKARIPARA
- +2 UHS PINDARI
- DISTRICT CM SCHOOL OF EXCELLENCE, DUMKA

This program focuses on improving performance of students across above 28 government schools in the district. Teachers need to ensure that entire curriculum is covered in classroom via online teaching during the academic year. Students also have additional online learning support after school. High performing students are enrolled in additional classes to prepare for competitive exams such as IIT JEE and NEET.

For higher education Dumka offers many colleges e.g.- Sido Kanhu Murmu University was established in 1992 at Dumka and covers whole Santhal Pargana. Many colleges are affiliated or constituent to SKMU in the division.

St. Xavier's College, Dumka offers various courses. Others include Santhal Pargana College (S.P. college), A.N. College, and S.P. Mahila College, which offer undergraduate, graduate and post-graduate courses.

Phulo-Jhano Murmu College of Dairy Technology at Hansdiha, Dumka is Jharkhand's first Dairy Technology college established in 2019. It is affiliated by Birsa Agricultural University, Ranchi.

GTRTC, Dumka (Government Tool Room and Training Centre) was established in 2007 by the Department of Industries, Government of Jharkahnd with the assistance of Ministry of MSME, Government of India. It offers various training programmes to meet need for technical manpower required in the manufacturing sector. Lahanti Institute of Multiple Skills was established by Evangelical Social Action Forum to provide skills training to unemployed youth in the remote regions of Santhal Pargana. Dumka also have a Govt. Polytechnic College, a Govt. Women's Polytechnic College and also a govt. ITI for technical education.

Dumka Engineering College was established as an institution under PPP model between the Government of Jharkhand and Techno India Group.

Phulo Jhano Murmu Medical College and Hospital was established in 2019 and it also contains hospitals for serving population of Dumka.

== Tourist places ==
- Basukinath Temple of Lord Shiva

=== Temples ===
- Maluti temple Village - Maluti is an ancient temple village of Dumka District under Shikaripara police station. It is near the border of West Bengal and Jharkhand State. There are many Shiva, Bishnu, Durga Terracotta temples.
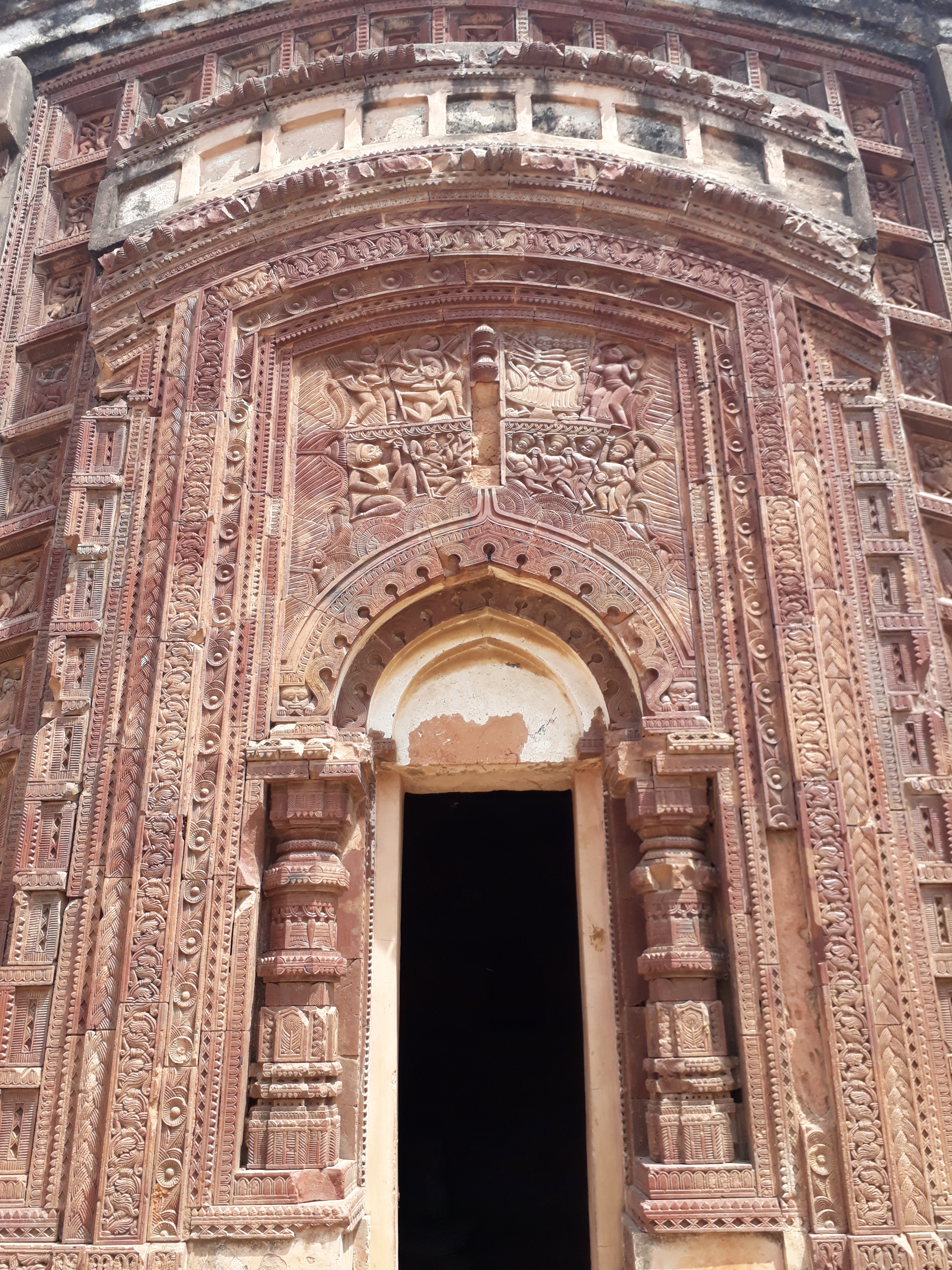
Maluti terracotta temple

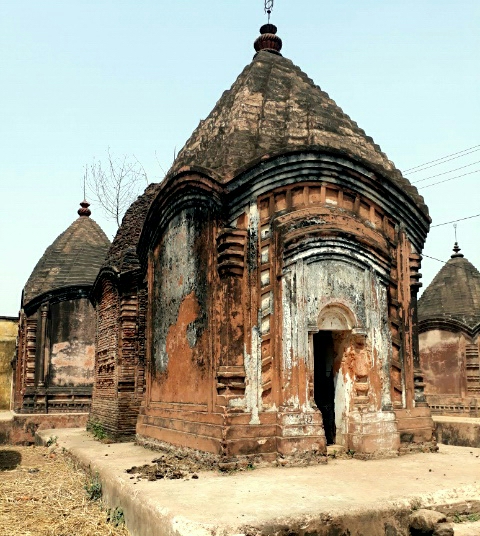
Maluti Temple

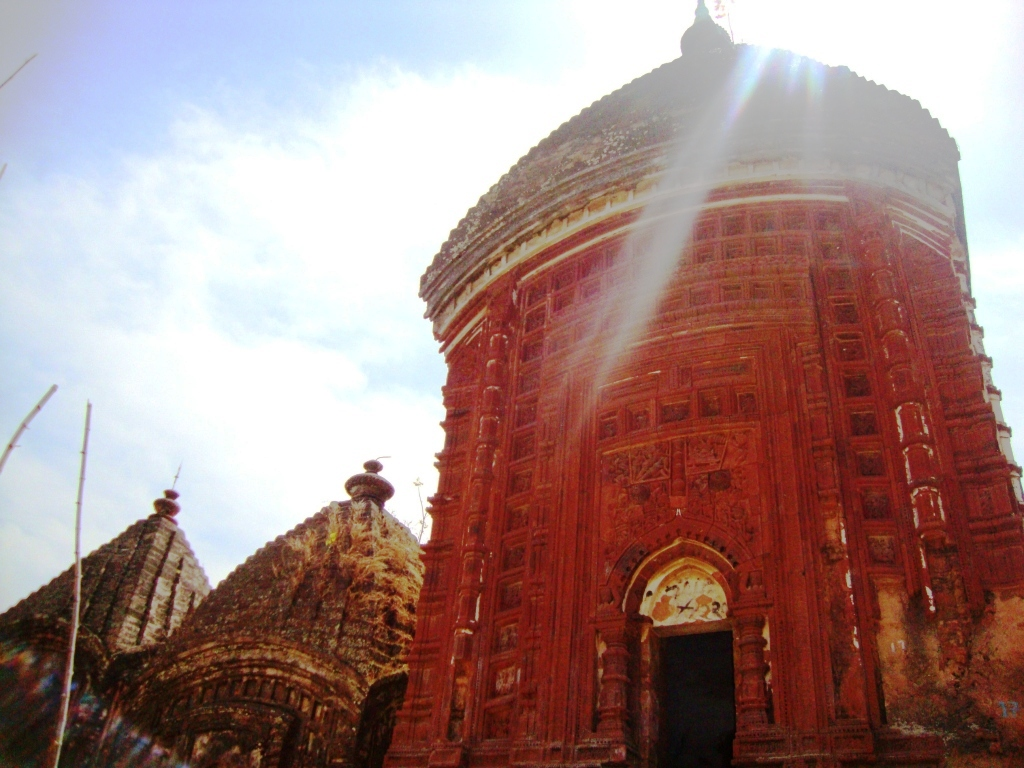
Malooti mandir

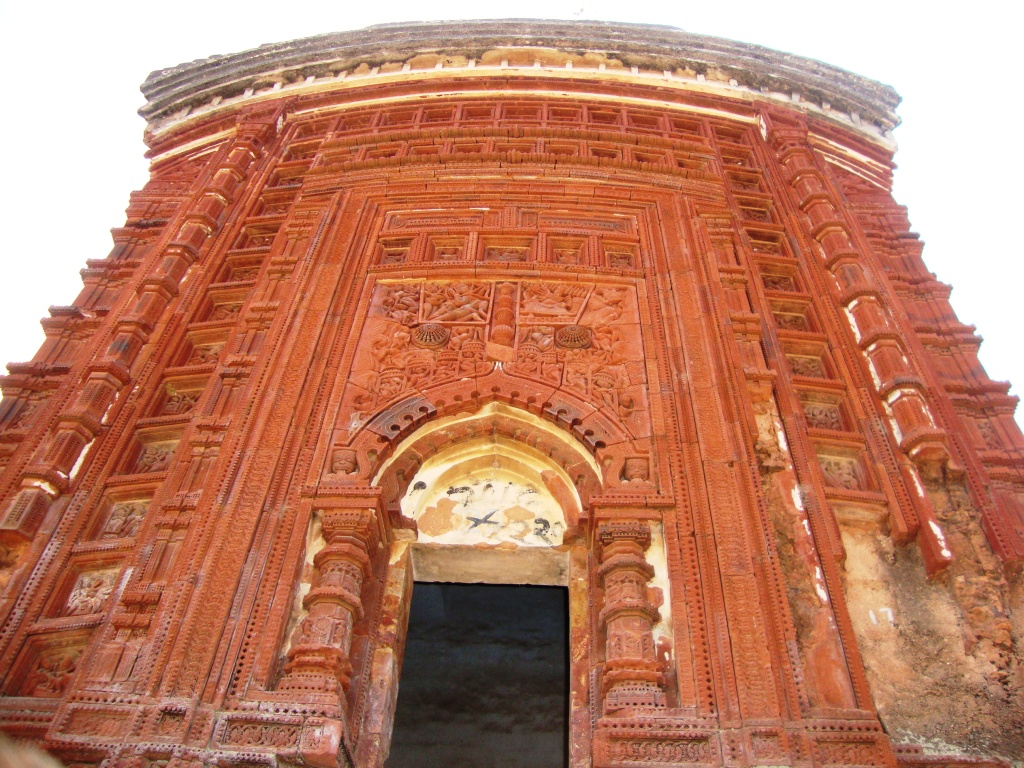
Malooti mandir

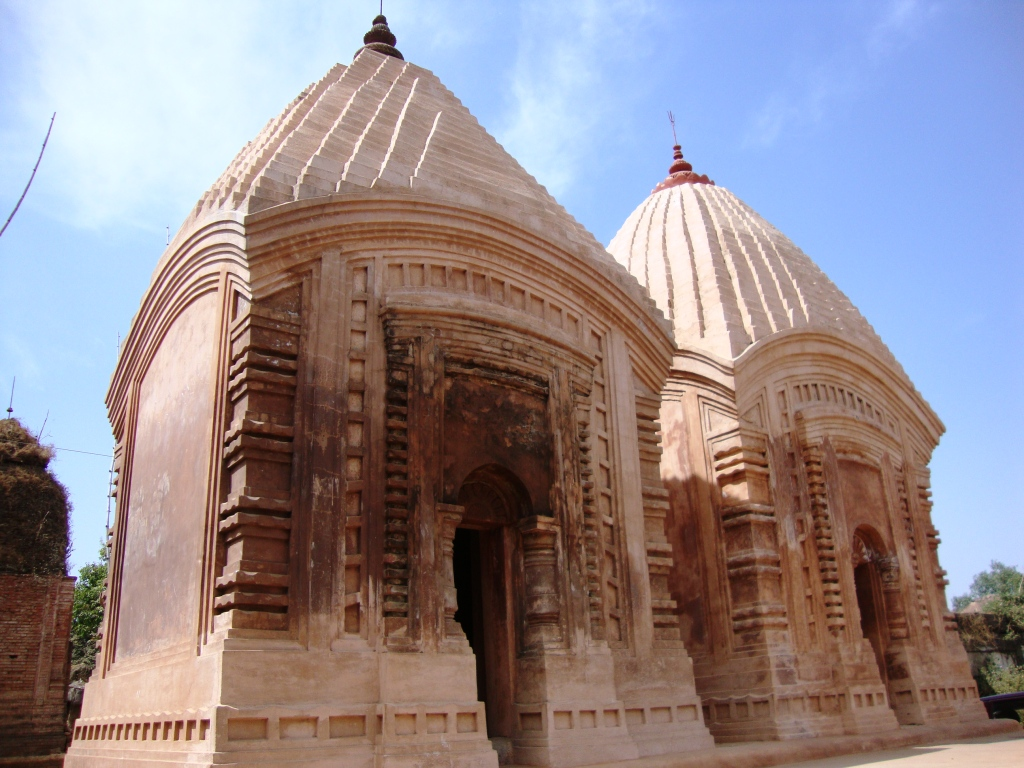
Malooti mandir

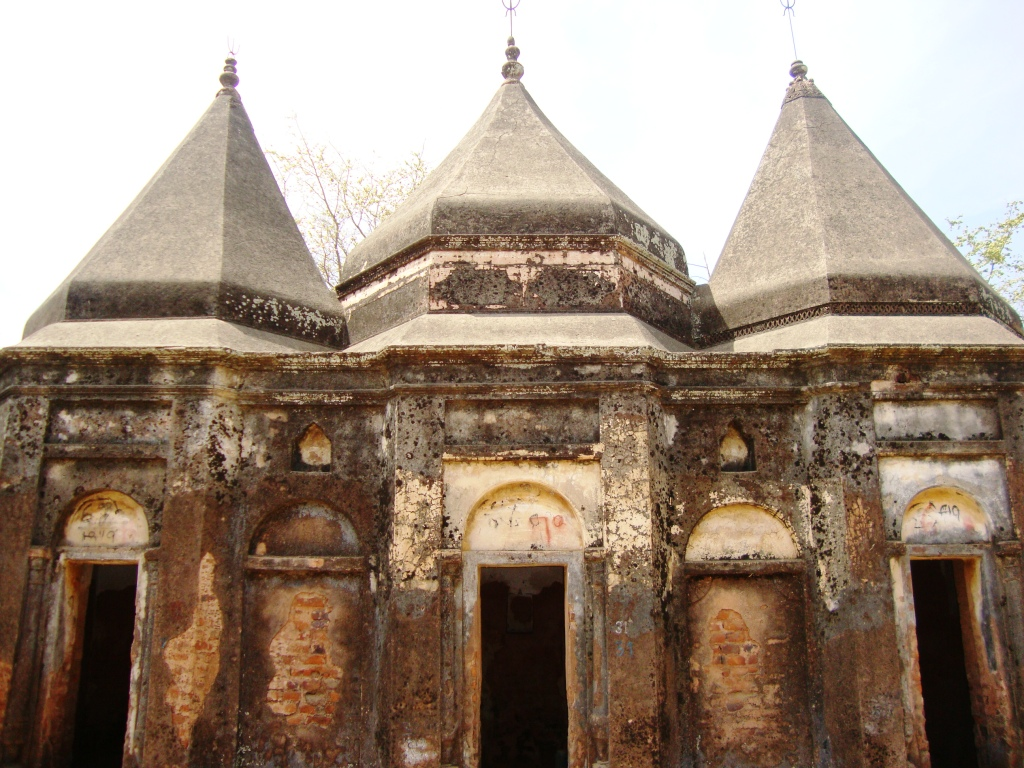
Malooti mandir

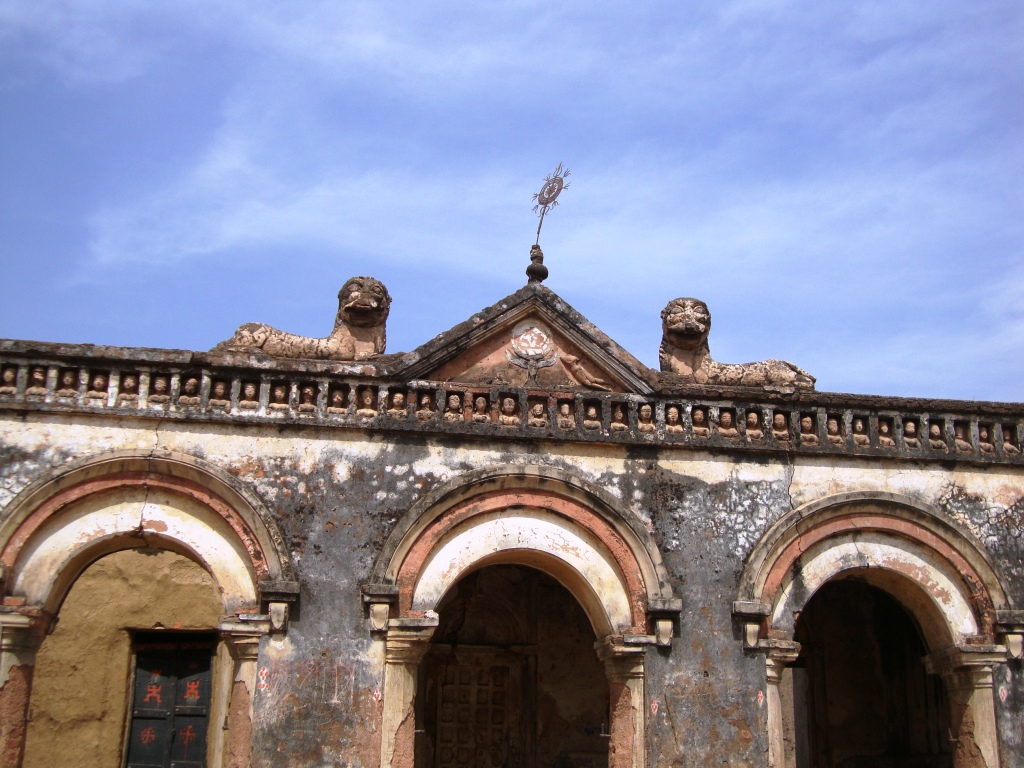
Malooti mandir

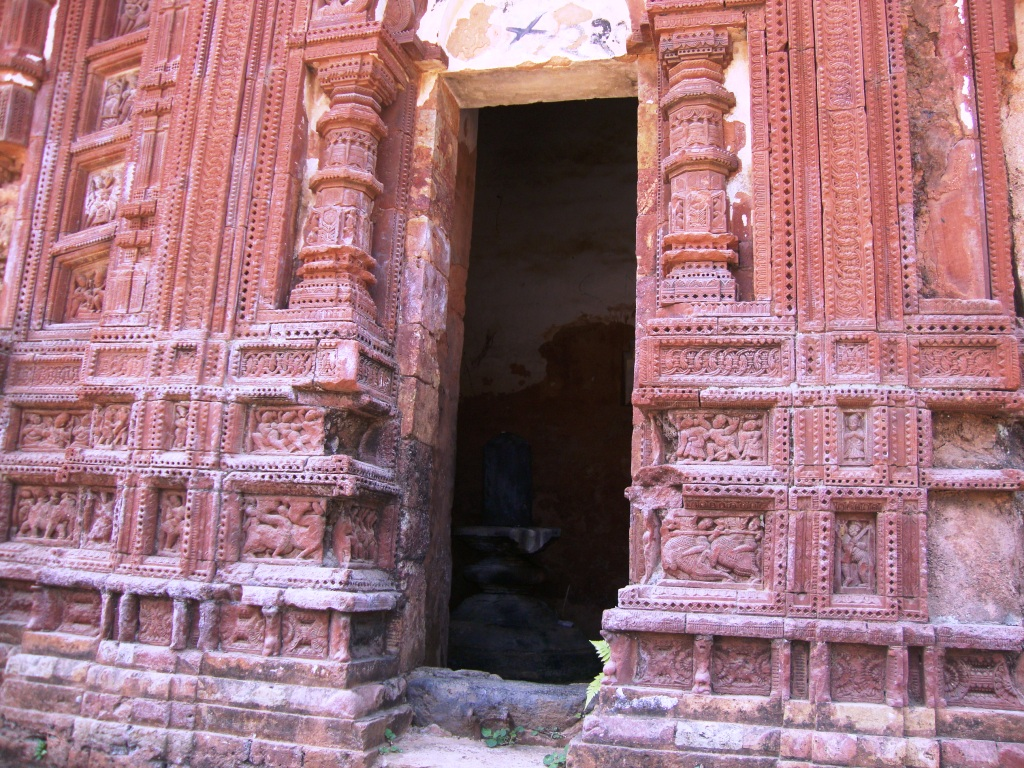
Malooti mandir

=== Tourist spots ===
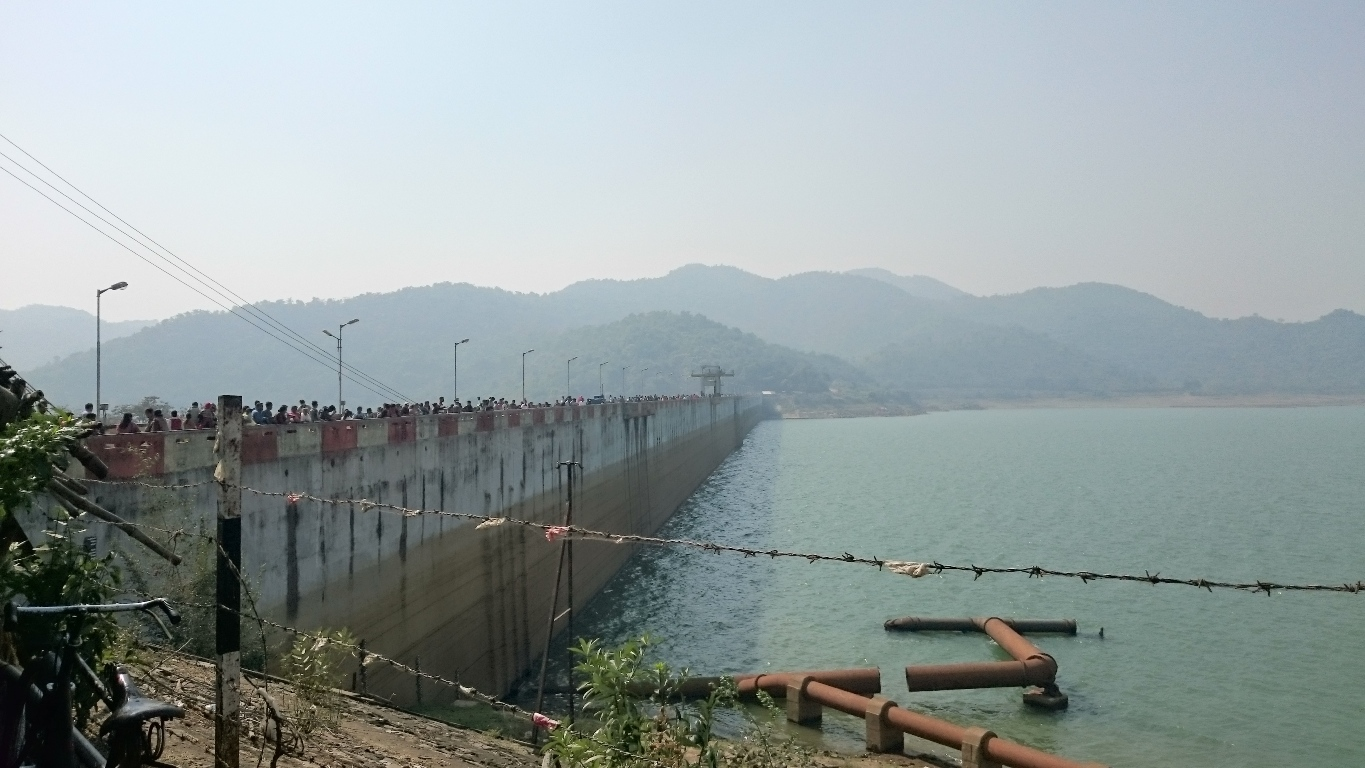
Massanjore Dam at Dumka

- Masanjore is a picnic spot situated 30 km to Dumka. This small village is about 30 km south of Dumka. The Masanjore dam on the Mayurakshi River is a tourist draw. From the counterpart rupee fund created through supplies of wheat and other materials from Canada for use in India, Canada Govt. devoted those funds to further development of the Mayurakshi project and Massanjore Dam was commissioned in 1955. The Dam is still mentioned as Canada Dam. The dam is bounded by hills and forests. Mayurakshi Bhawan Bungalow and Inspection Bungalow, offer accommodation within the village. By road, Masanjore is connected with Vakreshwara (59 km), Sainthia (50 km), Tarapith (70 km), Rampurhat (62 km) and Deoghar (98 km).
- Chutonath - It is situated 20 km from the district headquarters. Chutonath is a religious place of Hindu god Lord Chutonath. This festival is celebrated mainly in the month of April. This area has become a tourist attraction.
- Dharmasthan - It is temple situated in Tin bazaar at the heart of Dumka Town, it is known for the Goddess Kali, during the Durga puja 7 days special puja is organised here.

=== Natural places ===
- Kurwa park (Shrishti Pahar) - It is a small picnic spot about 5 km to the east of Dumka. It has a park, facilities for boating and a small hill. A temple is also situated here.

== Transport ==
=== Rail ===
In July 2011, Dumka was connected to Jasidih with the newly built Jasidih - Dumka railway line. Since then, the city has seen a growing number of three-wheelers on the road. in June 2015, Dumka Rampurhat Train service is also started.

=== Road ===
Dumka is connected by road to the neighboring cities such as Deoghar, Bhagalpur, Dhanbad, Rampurhat. Buses are the preferred mode of transport and are run by both government agencies and private operators. Dumka has good connectivity to neighboring districts with buses. There is a luxury night bus service between Dumka–Ranchi and Kolkata.

=== Air ===
Nearby airports are:

- Deoghar Airport
- Kazi Nazrul Islam Airport, Durgapur
- Birsa Munda Airport, Ranchi
- Jay Prakash Narayan Airport, Patna
- Netaji Subhas Chandra Bose International Airport, Kolkata
