= Massanjore Dam =

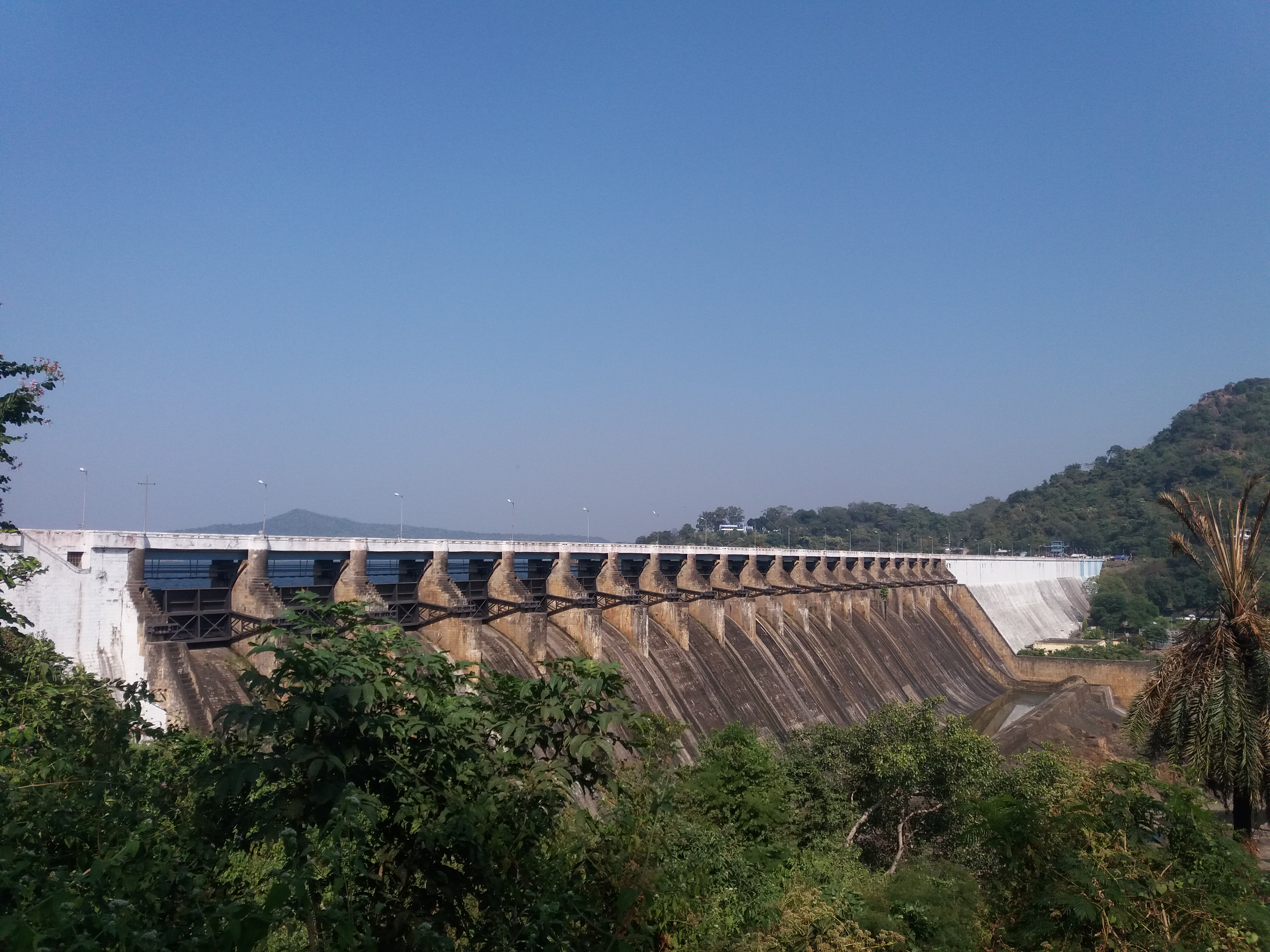

- Location in Jharkhand Massanjore Dam (India)
- Country: India
- Location: Dumka District, Jharkhand
- Coordinates: 24.1068°N 87.3084°E
- Status: Functional
- Opening date: 1955

Dam and spillways
- Impounds: Mayurakshi River
- Height: 47.25 m (155.0 ft)
- Length: 661.58 m (2,170.5 ft)

Reservoir
- Creates: Massanjore Lake
- Total capacity: 617 million cubic meters (21.79 tmcft)
- Active capacity: 549.13 million cubic meters (19.39 tmcft)
- Surface area: 67.4 square kilometres (16,650 acres)

Massanjore Dam is a hydropower generating dam over the Mayurakshi River located at Massanjore near Dumka in the state of Jharkhand, India. The Massanjore dam (also called Canada Dam), across the Mayurakshi, was commissioned in 1955. It was formally inaugurated by Lester B. Pearson, Foreign Minister of Canada. The Mayurakshi River at the dam site has a catchment area of 1869 km^{2}

== Geography ==
Cities, towns and locations in the Deoghar, Dumka and Jamtara districts in Santhal Pargana Division
M: Municipality, CT: census town, R: Rural/ Urban centre, D: Dam,
Owing to space constraints in the small map, the actual locations in a larger map may vary slightly

=== Location ===
Massanjore dam at 23°06′03″N 87°19′31″E is about 36 kilometres (22 mi) upstream from Siuri in West Bengal and is about 34 kilometres (21 mi) from Dumka in Jharkhand.

== Dam ==
It is 47.25 m high from its base and is 661.58 m long. The reservoir has an area of 67.4 square kilometres (16,650 acres) when full and has a storage capacity of 617,000,000 cubic metres (500,210 acre⋅ft). The length of the overflow section is 225.60 m and is controlled by 21 bays, each 9.144 m wide. The design discharge is 4.446 cumecs. The full reservoir level is 121.34 m and the flood level is 122.56 m. It cost Rs. 16.10 crore.

== Canal ==
Mayurakshi Left Bank Canal- Length 20.54 kilometres (Lined Canal).

Mayurakshi Right Bank Canal-Yet to be constructed.

== Finance ==
The dam was funded by the counterpart rupee fund created through supplies of wheat and other materials from Canada for use in India. Canada devoted those rupees to the further development of the Mayurakshi dam project.

== Flood reserve ==
Unfortunately, the Massanjore dam was not allowed to have a flood reserve. In 1956 the state government selectively took over flood control embankments till then maintained by the landlords or local bodies.

== See also ==
- List of dams and reservoirs in India
