= Bhandirban =

- Village
- Location in West Bengal, India Bhandirban (India) Bhandirban (India)
- Coordinates: 23.9728499°N 87.4614822°E
- Country: India
- State: West Bengal
- District: Birbhum

Languages
  - Official: Bengali, English
- Time zone: UTC+5:30 (IST)
- Vehicle registration: WB
- Lok Sabha constituency: Birbhum
- Website: birbhum.nic.in

Bhandirban is a village in Birbhum district of West Bengal state. The name of the place is also spelled alternatively as Bhandier Bon. Bhandirban village is administered by the Khatanga, West Bengal gram panchayat of Suri I community development block in Suri Sadar subdivision of Birbhum district. The village is located on the banks of the Mayurakshi River on Suri-Dumka highway at a distance of 10 km from the district headquarter at Suri, Birbhum.

== Demographics ==
As per the 2011 Census of India, Bhandirban had a total population of 1,168 of which 605 (52%) were males and 563 (48%) were females. Population below 6 years was 147. The total number of literates in Bhandirban was 704 (68.95% of the population over 6 years)

== History ==
This place was under Zemindari of Burdwan Maharaja in British era. There are two temples explored by Archeological Survey of India- Bhandirban Gopal Mandir and Bhandeswar Shiv Mandir situated in Bhandirban village.

== Gopal Bari ==
Gopal Bari also known as Gopal Mandir is a temple dedicated to the deity Krishna. The stone plate on the temple credits the origin of the temple to the local legend, according to which a hermit Dhruv Goswami while wandering at Bhandirban had placed on the ground, the twelve images of Gopal he was carrying. One of the images got stuck on the location where it was placed after which a temple was built at that location, by Ramnath Bhaduri, the Diwan of Murshidabad Nawab Muhhammad-Ul- Zaman Khan in the year 1754. Fairs and festivals on the eve of Goshtashtami (also known as Gopashtami) are celebrated every year in the Bengali month of Kartik

== Bhandeswar Shiva Mandir ==
Bhandeswar Shiva Mandir is located behind the Gopal Mandir. It was rebuilt by Ramnath Bhaduri. The laterite stone temple built by Bhaduri is tall pyramida sikharal type. The spire is about 45 feet high. The floor of shrine is 5 feet below the level of platform. The enshrined linga is a natural boulder, to the right of which is placed a four-handed stone image of Goddesses Durga.

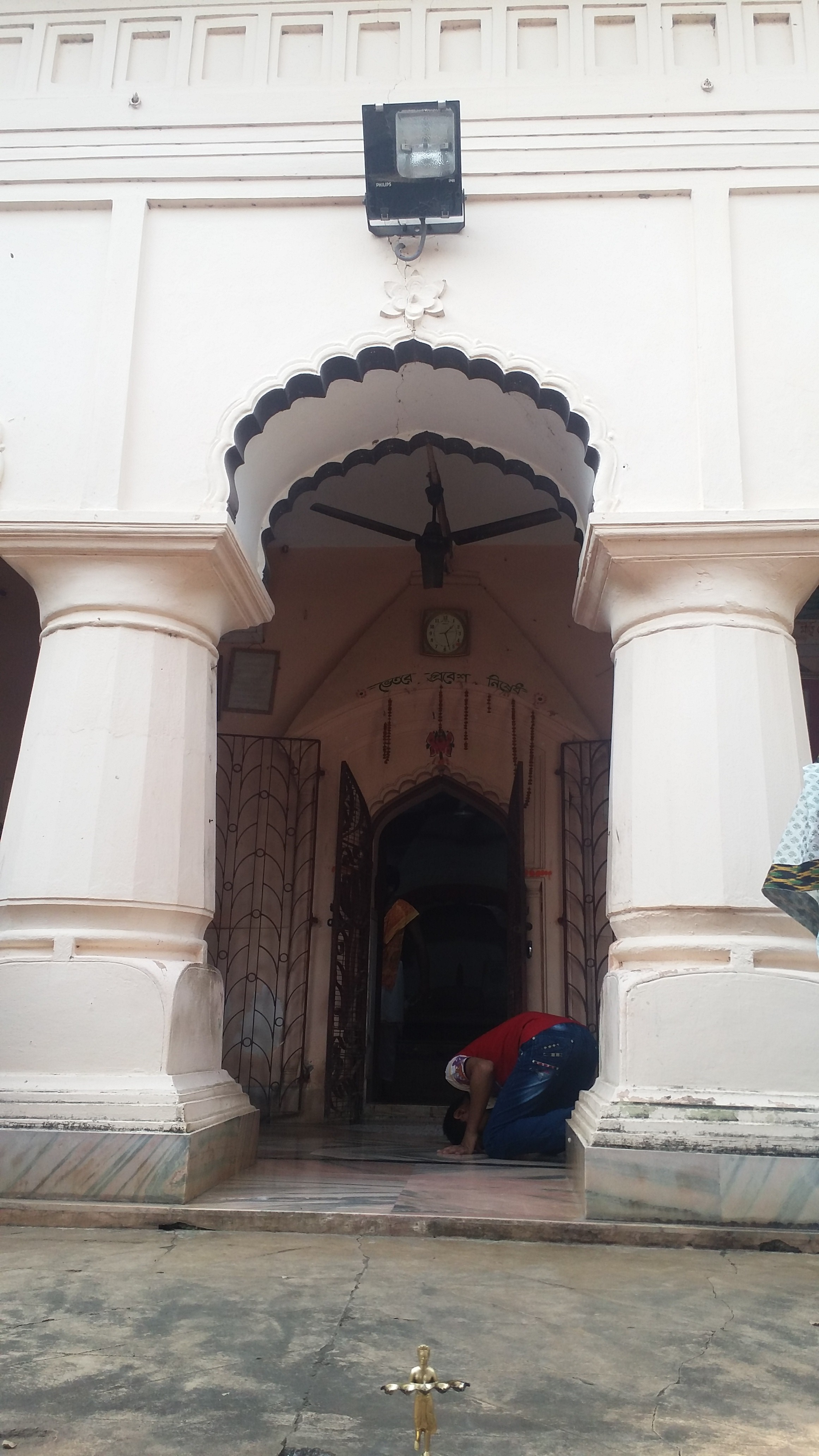
Gopal Mandir

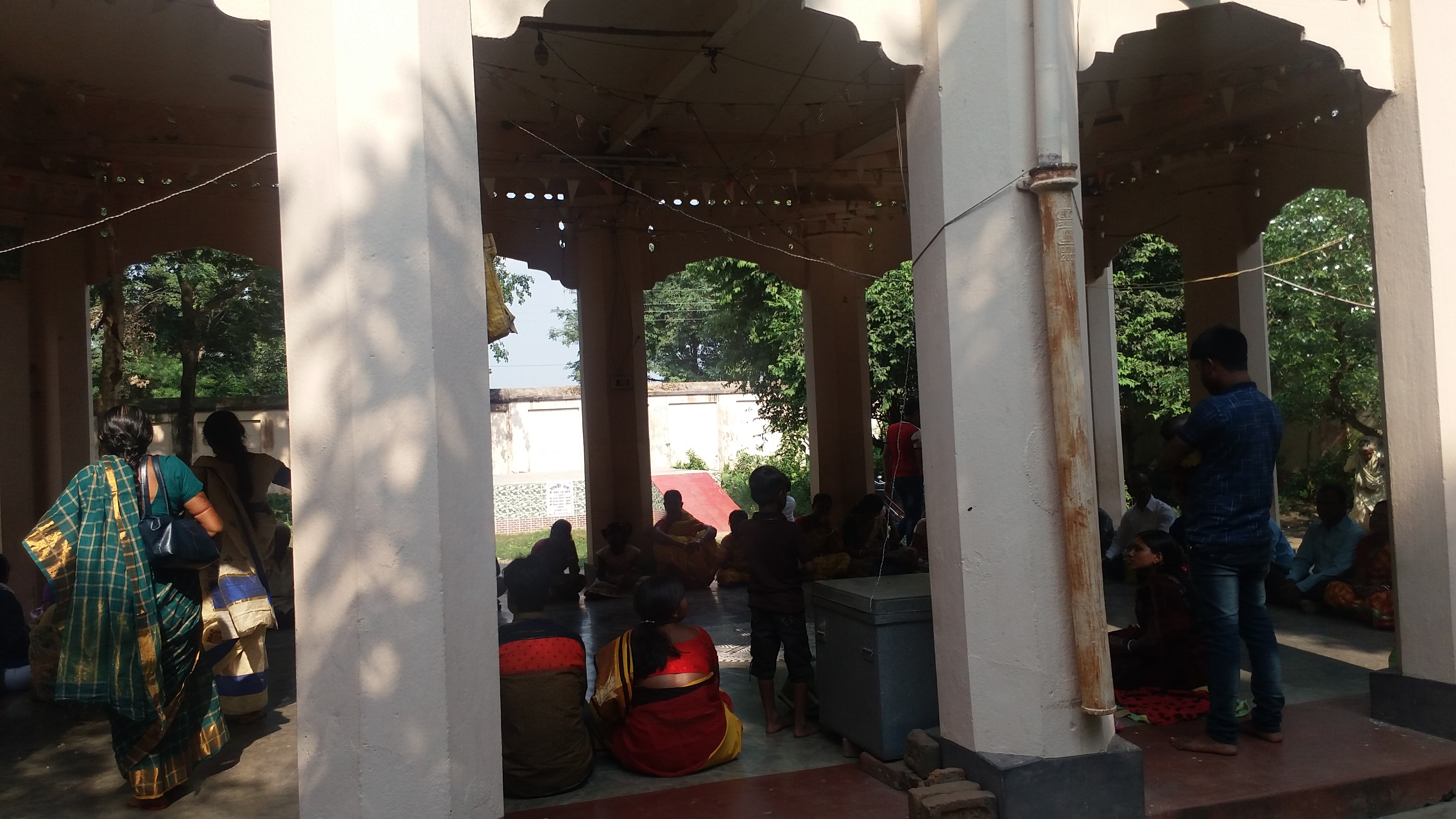

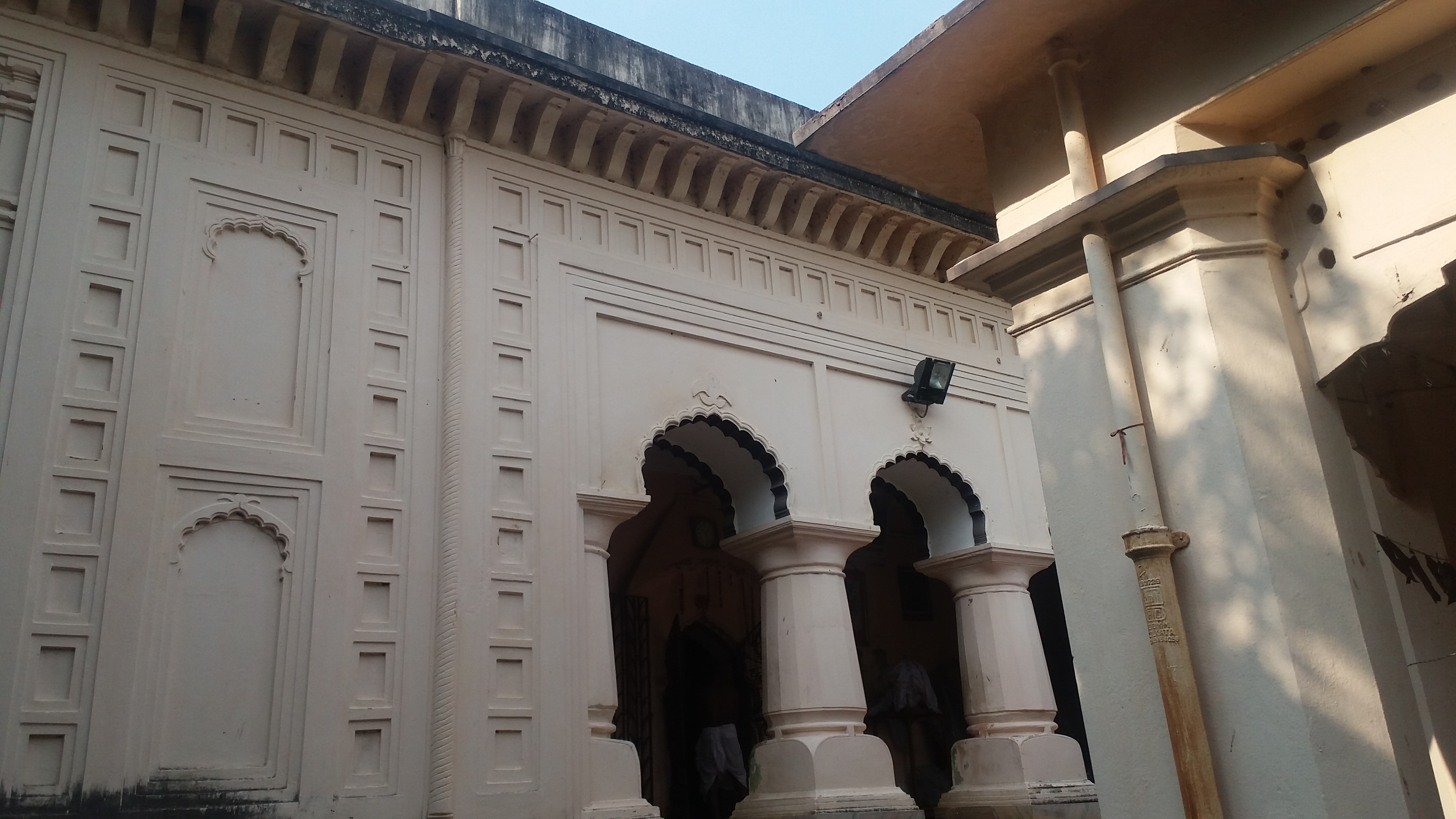
Side view Gopal Mandir

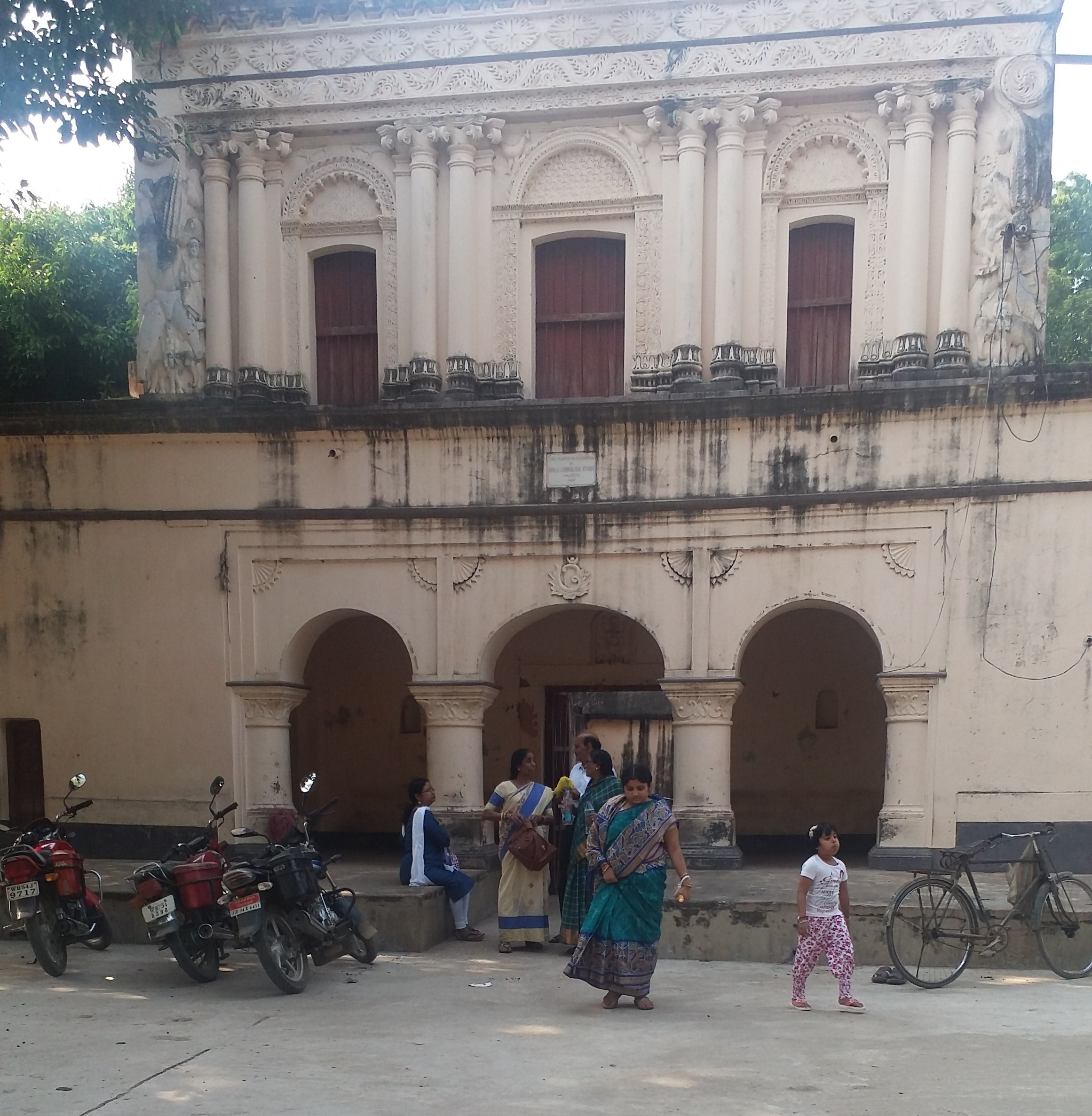
Main Gate Gopal Mandir

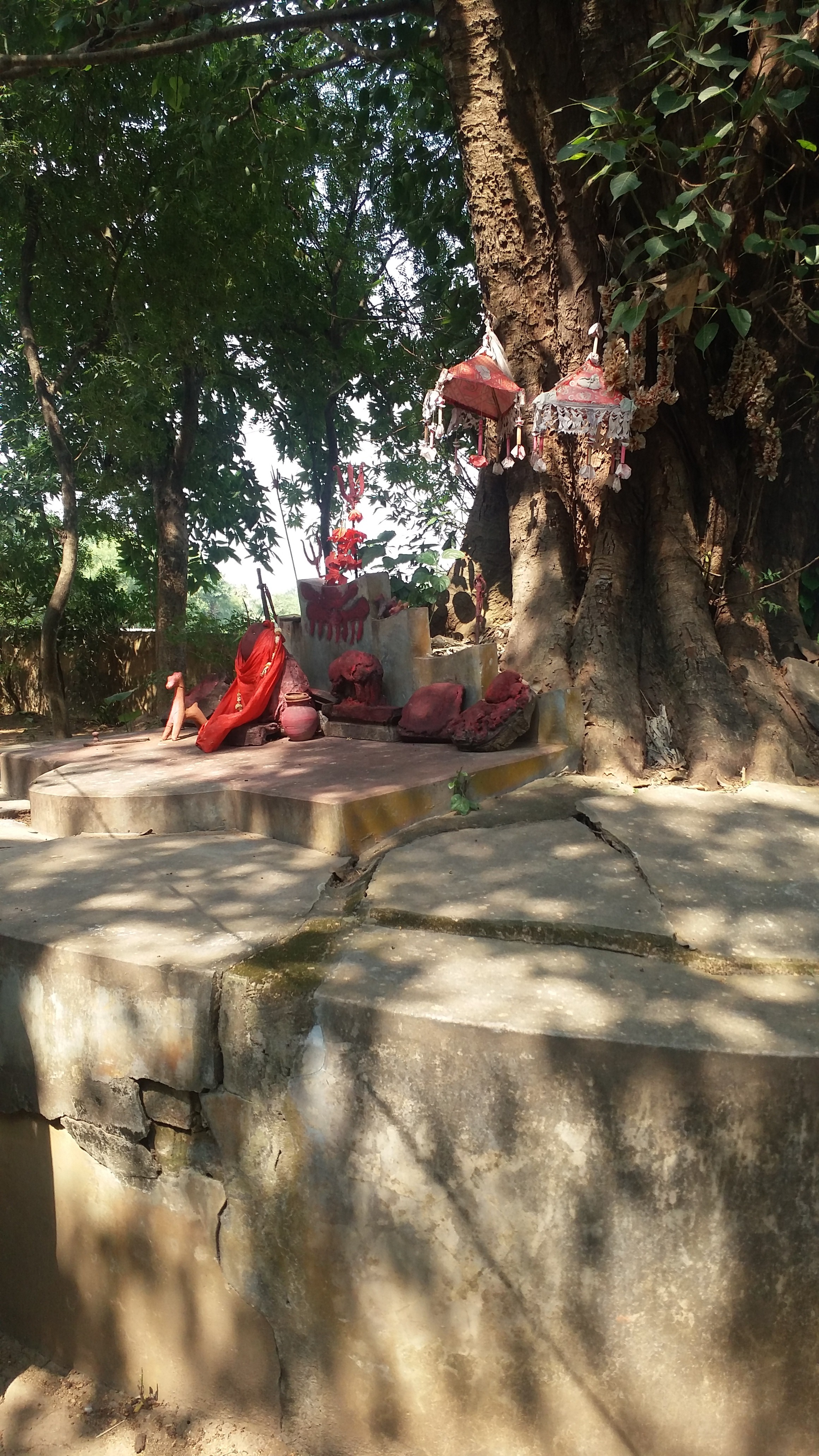
Shasthitala, Bhandeswar Shiv Mandir

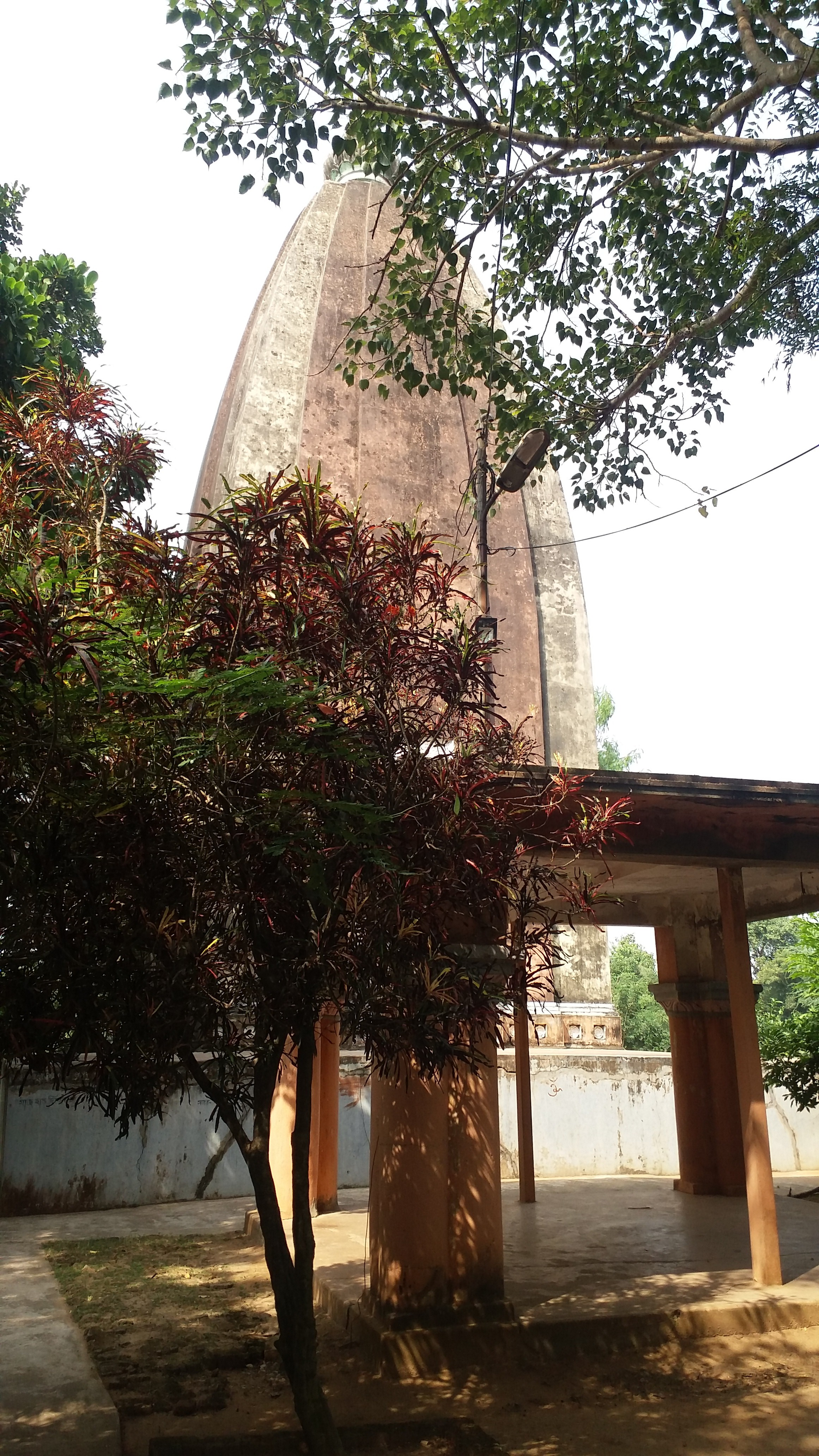
Bhandeswar Shiv Mandir
