= Mayurakshi River =

Major river in Jharkhand and West Bengal, India

Mayurakshi River Mor River
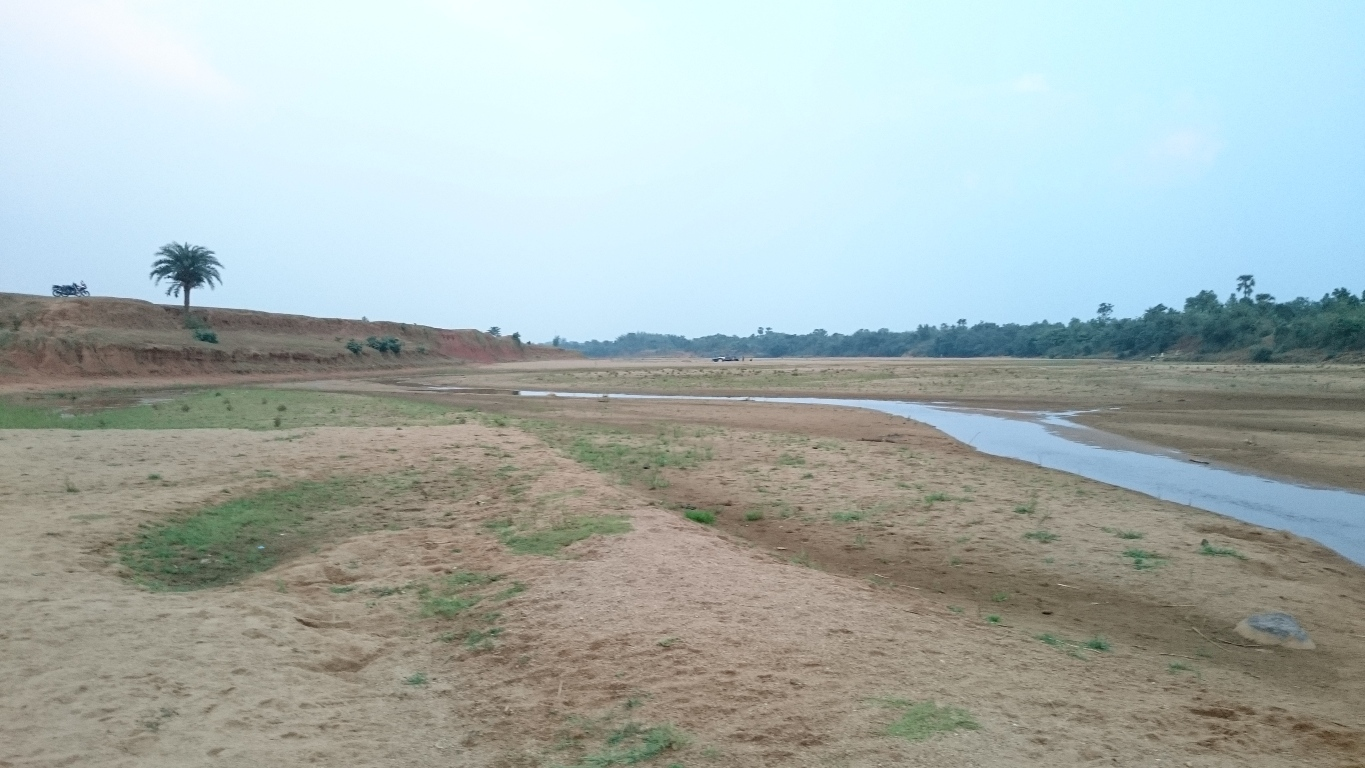
- Mayurakshi River in its upper reaches

Location
- Country: India
- State: Jharkhand, West Bengal
- Cities: Dumka, Suri, Sainthia, Bhandirban

Physical characteristics
- Source: Trikut Hill
  - location: Deoghar, Jharkhand
  - coordinates: 24°29′00″N 86°42′0″E
- Length: 265 km (165 mi)
- Discharge
  - location: Hooghly River

Basin features
- Tributaries
  - right: Kopai, Brahmani, Dwaraka, Bakreshwar

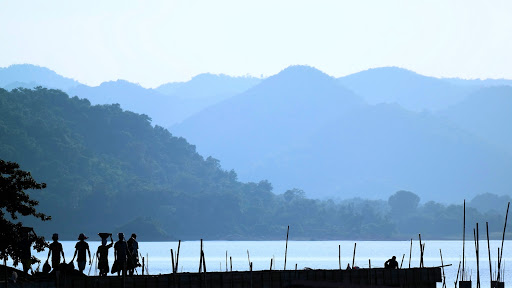
Mayurakshi River in Dumka district

The Mayurakshi (also called Mor River) is a major river in Jharkhand and West Bengal, India, with a long history of devastating floods.

It has its source on Trikut Hills, about 16 kilometres (10 mi) from Deoghar in Jharkhand state. The Mayurakshi flows through Jharkhand and then through the districts of Birbhum and Murshidabad in West Bengal before flowing into the Hooghly River. The river is about 265 kilometres (165 mi) long.

Mayurakshi literally means "peacock eyes" (mayur/mor=peacock, akshi=eye). The comparison is with the beautiful feathers on a peacock's tail. Though named after its crystal clear water in the dry season, the Mayurakshi floods its valley during the monsoons. Even after the construction of the Massanjore dam, it floodwaters continue to wreak havoc, washing away embankments.

== Floods and their control ==
Many of the rivers that originate on the Chota Nagpur Plateau, including the Mayurakshi, and flow down into West Bengal are rain fed and have for ages wrought havoc with their seasonal floods. Annual rainfall over the basin varies between 765 and 1,607 millimetres (30 and 63 in) with an average of 1,200 millimetres (47 in) of which 80 percent occurs during the monsoon season from June to September.

Some of the historically important floods in this river were recorded by L.S.S. O'Malley in the Bengal District Gazetteers for the districts of Murshidabad and Birbhum. For the district of Birbhum, O'Malley has noted "in 1787 there was a high flood which it is said, in some places swept off villages, inhabitants and cattle, the crops on the ground, with everything that was moveable." O'Malley also recorded that "in 1806 the Mayurakshi and Ajay had a sudden extraordinary rise and floods washed away whole villages." In September 1902, because of heavy rains the Brahmani and the Mayurakshi overflowed their banks and inundated the surrounding country in some places to the depth of 4 to 6 metres (12 to 20 ft)

=== Massanjore Dam ===
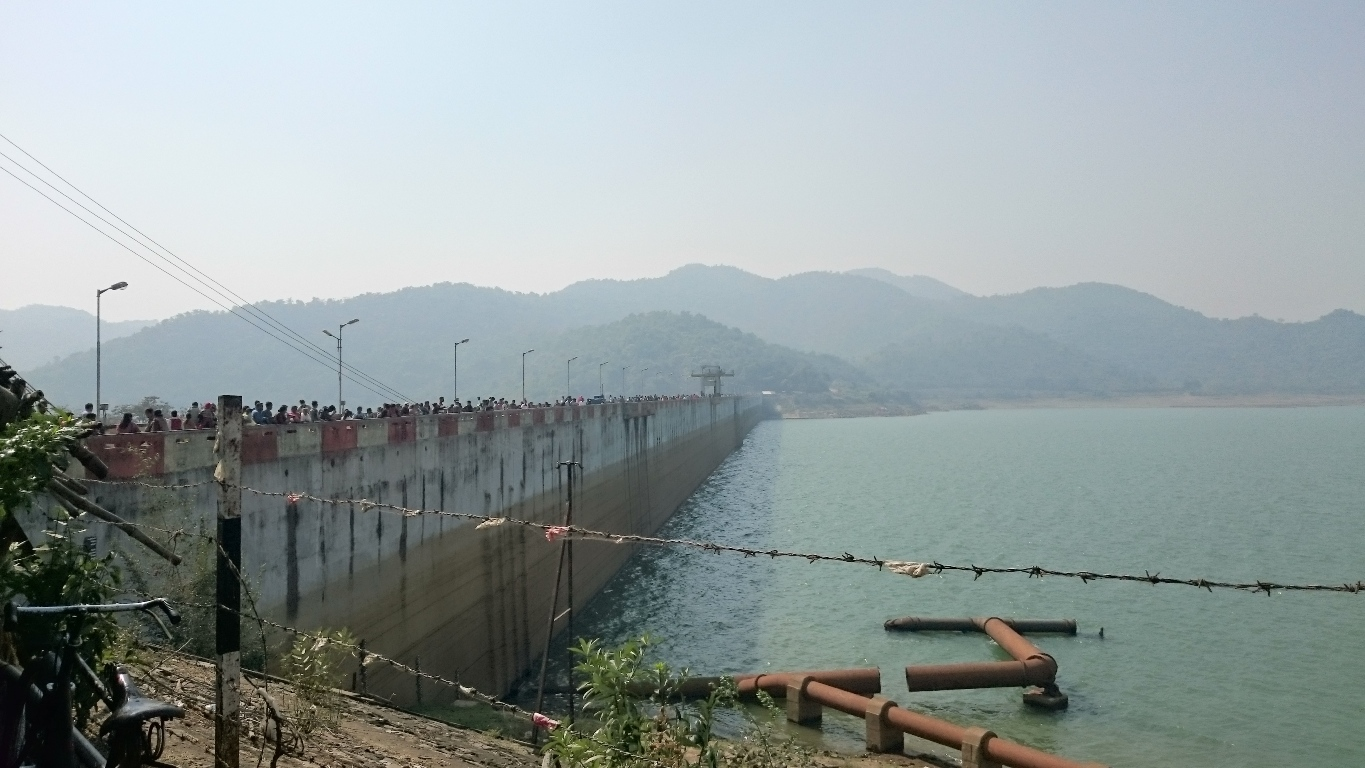
Massanjore Dam at Dumka

From the counterpart rupee fund created through supplies of wheat and other materials from Canada for use in India, Canada devoted those rupees to the further development of the Mayurakshi dam project. The Massanjore dam (also called Canada Dam), across the Mayurakshi, was commissioned in 1955. It was formally inaugurated by Lester B. Pearson, Foreign Minister of Canada. Unfortunately, the Massanjore dam located near Dumka in the state of Jharkhand (erstwhile Bihar) was not allowed to have any flood reserve. Simultaneously with construction of dams the state government in 1956, selectively took over flood control embankments till then maintained by the landlords or local bodies. Massanjore dam is about 38 kilometres (24 mi) upstream from Siuri in West Bengal. It is 47 metres (155 ft) high from its base and is 660 metres (2,170 ft) long. The reservoir has an area of 67.4 square kilometres (16,650 acres) when full and has a storage capacity of 617,000,000 cubic metres (500,210 acre⋅ft). It had cost Rs. 16.10 crore.

=== Tilpara Barrage ===
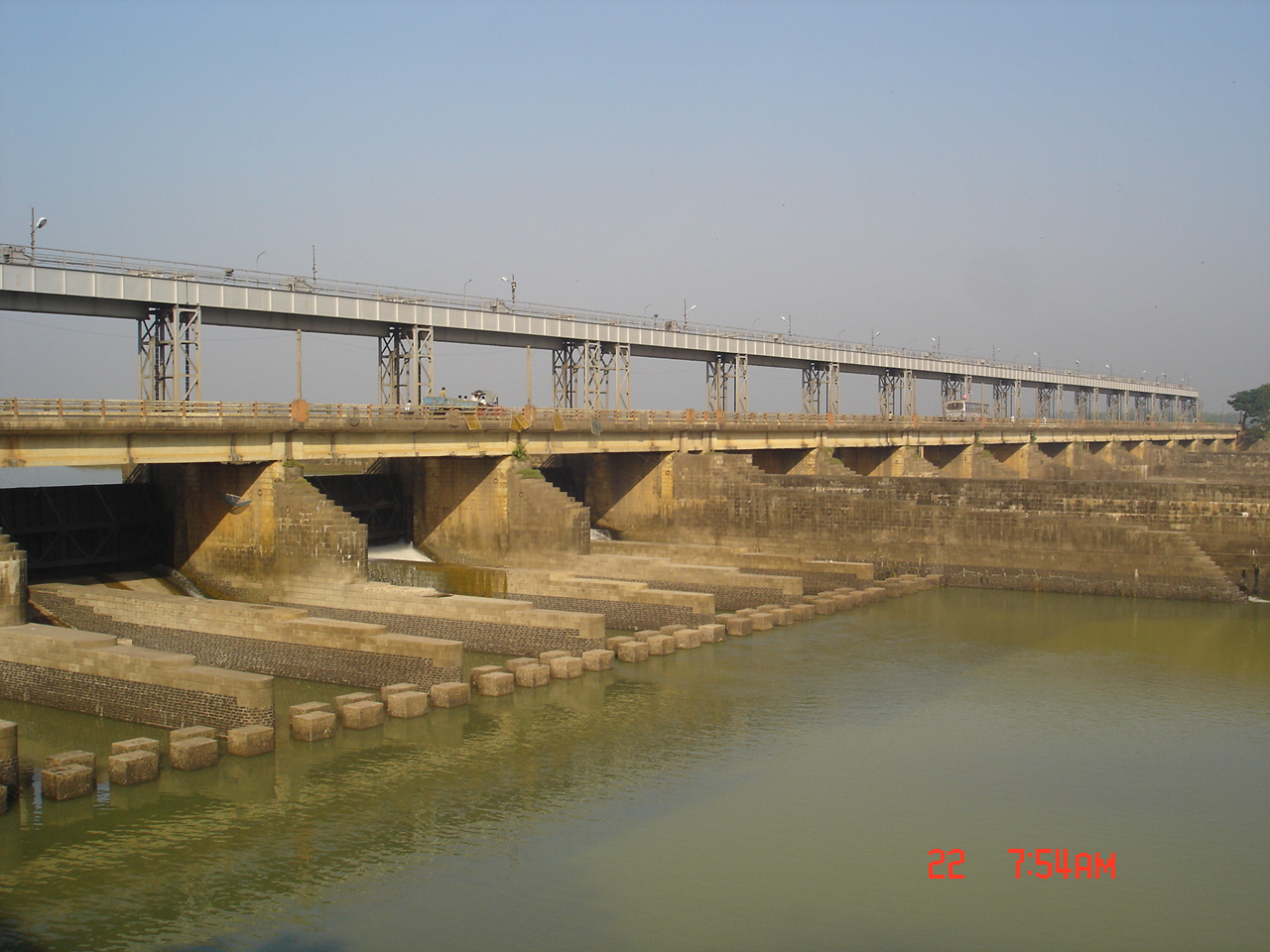
Tilpara Barrage near Suri

Apart from the Massanjore Dam there is a barrage, some 32 kilometres (20 mi) downstream, at Tilpara, near Suri. The barrage is 309 metres (1,013 ft) long and had cost Rs. 1.11 crore.

=== Since 1960 ===
In the four decades between 1960 and 2000 only five years could be identified as flood-free years, when only less than 500 square kilometres (190 mi^{2}) of area were inundated. After major floods in 1978, West Bengal suffered consecutively in 1998, 1999 and 2000. In 1978, seventy two hours of continuous and concentrated rainfall over the western river basin areas of the Bhagirathi viz. from the Pagla-Bansloi to the Ajay, generated so huge flood volume that all embankments on the eastern side of the Bhagirathi were almost washed away and the whole of Nadia district, a larger part of Murshidabad district and northern areas of North 24 Parganas district were flooded and remained underwater for a long time. Construction of embankments is the only structural measure available for the provision of relief to the people. Major embankments line long stretches of such rivers as Mayurakshi, Dwarka, Brahmani and Ajay

== Irrigation and power ==
Massanjore dam has ensured irrigation of some 2,400 square kilometres (600,000 acres) of land with an estimated resultant increased yield of approximately 400,000 tons of food annually and generation of 2,000 kW of electric power.

== Tributaries ==
The Mayurakshi is fed by tributaries Brahmani, Dwaraka, Bakreshwar and Kopai.
