= Mallis =

Mallis is a surname. Notable people with the surname include:

- A. George Mallis (1915-1999), American numismatist
- Arnold Mallis (1910–1984), American entomologist
- Fern Mallis (born 1948), executive director of the Council of Fashion Designers of America (CFDA) from 1991–2001

== See also ==
- Malice (disambiguation)
- Malliß, municipality of Mecklenburg-Vorpommern, Germany
- Mount Mallis, mountain in Antarctica
