= Rampurhat I =

- Community development block
- Interactive map of Rampurhat I
- Coordinates: 24.1860556°N 87.781944°E
- Country: India
- State: West Bengal
- District: Birbhum
- Parliamentary constituency: Birbhum
- Assembly constituency: Rampurhat

Area
  - Total: 287.63 km^{2} (111.05 sq mi)

Population (2011)
  - Total: 188,435
  - Density: 655.13/km^{2} (1,696.8/sq mi)
- Time zone: UTC+5.30 (IST)
- PIN: 731224 (Rampurhat)
- Telephone/STD code: 03461
- Literacy Rate: 73.29 per cent
- Website: http://birbhum.nic.in/

Rampurhat I is a community development block that forms an administrative division in Rampurhat subdivision of Birbhum district in the Indian state of West Bengal.

== Overview ==
Birbhum district is physiographically a part of the ancient Rarh region. The western portion of the district is basically an extension of the Chota Nagpur Plateau. The area has mostly loose reddish lateritic low fertility soil. In the east, the flood plains of the major rivers, such as the Ajay, Bakreshwar, Mayurakshi and Brahmani, have soft alluvial soil. The forest cover is only 3.5% of the total district. Although coal is found in the district and Bakreshwar Thermal Power Station has a capacity of 2,010 MW, the economic condition of Birbhum is dominated by agriculture. From 1977 onwards majorland reforms took place in West Bengal. Land in excess of land ceiling was acquired and distributed amongst the peasants. In Birbhum district, 19,968 hectares of vested agricultural land has been distributed amongst 161,515 beneficiaries, till 2011. However, more than 38% of the operational land holding is marginal or less than 1 acre. The proportion of agricultural labourers amongst total workers in Birbhum district is 45.9%, the highest amongst all districts of West Bengal. Culturally rich Birbhum, with such traditional landmarks as Jaydev Kenduli and Chandidas Nanoor, is home to Visva-Bharati University at Santiniketan, having close association with two Nobel laureates – Rabindranath Tagore and Amartya Sen.

== Geography ==
Map of Birbhum district showing CD blocks and municipal areas. Click on the map to view larger map.

Rampurhat is located at 24.1860556°N 87.781944°E.

Rampurhat I CD Block is part of the Brahmani-Mayurakshi Basin, one of the four sub-micro physiographic regions occupying the area between Brahmani River in the north and Mayurakshi River in the south.

Rampurhat I CD Block is bounded by Nalhati I CD Block on the north, Rampurhat II CD Block on the east, Mayureswar I and Mohammad Bazar CD Blocks on the south and Shikaripara CD Block, in Dumka district of Jharkhand, on the west.

Rampurhat I CD Block has an area of 287.63 km^{2}. It has 1 panchayat samity, 9 gram panchayats, 98 gram sansads (village councils), 119 mouzas and 113 inhabited villages, as per District Statistical Handbook Birbhum 2008. Rampurhat police station serves this block. Headquarters of this CD Block is at Rampurhat.

Gram panchayats of Rampurhat I block/panchayat samiti are: Ayas, Barshal, Bonhat, Dakhalbati, Kastogara, Kharun, Kusumaba, Mashra and Narayanpur.

== Demographics ==
=== Population ===
As per the 2011 Census of India, Rampurhat I CD Block had a total population of 188,435, all of which were rural. There were 95,977 (51%) males and 92,458 (49%) females. Population below 6 years was 25,009. Scheduled Castes numbered 60,228 (31.96%) and Scheduled Tribes numbered 25,815 (13.70%).

At the 2001 census, Rampurhat I block had a total population of 159,148, of which 81,292 were males and 77,856 were females. Rampurhat I block registered a population growth of 18.48 per cent during the 1991-2001 decade. Decadal growth for Birbhum district was 17.88 per cent. Decadal growth in West Bengal was 17.84 per cent.

Large villages (with 4,000+ population) in Rampurhat I CD Block are (2011 census figures in brackets): Narayanpur (9,994), Balia Mrityunjoypur (4,717), Radipur (4,111), Tarachua (6,276), Kashtagar (4,529), Ramrampur (5,095), Ayas (8,906), Joykrishnapur (4,297) and Bagtui (5,095).

Other villages in Rampurhat I CD Block include (2011 census figures in brackets): Kusumba (2,762), Banhat (2,892), Masra (2,863), Kharun (1,912) and Dakhalbati (3,874).

=== Literacy ===
As per the 2011 census the total number of literates in Rampurhat I CD Block was 119,769 (73.29% of the population over 6 years) out of which males numbered 66,596 (80.12% of the male population over 6 years) and females numbered 53,173 (66.21% of the female population over 6 years). The gender disparity (the difference between female and male literacy rates) was 13.91%.

See also – List of West Bengal districts ranked by literacy rate

Literacy in CD blocks of
Birbhum district
Rampurhat subdivision
Murarai I – 55.67%
Murarai II – 58.28%
Nalhati I – 69.83%
Nalhati II – 71.68%
Rampurhat I – 73.29%
Rampurhat II – 70.77%
Mayureswar I – 71.52%
Mayureswar II – 70.89%
Suri Sadar subdivision
Mohammad Bazar – 65.18%
Rajnagar – 68.10%
Suri I – 72.75%
Suri II – 72.75%
Sainthia – 72.33%
Dubrajpur – 68.26%
Khoyrasol – 68.75%
Bolpur subdivision
Bolpur Sriniketan – 70.67%
Ilambazar – 74.27%
Labpur – 71.20%
Nanoor – 69.45%
2011 Census: CD Block Wise

Primary Census Abstract Data

=== Language and religion ===
Religion in Rampuarhat I CD block (2011)
Hinduism	67.38%
Islam	30.61%
Christianity	1.33%
Sarna	0.56%
Other or not stated	0.12%

In the 2011 census, Hindus numbered 126,960 and formed 67.38% of the population in Rampurhat I CD Block. Muslims numbered 57,680 and formed 30.61% of the population. Christians numbered 2,511 and formed 1.33% of the population. Others numbered 1,284 and formed 0.68% of the population.

The proportion of Hindus in Birbhum district has declined from 72.2% in 1961 to 62.3% in 2011. The proportion of Muslims in Birbhum district has increased from 27.6% to 37.1% during the same period. Christians formed 0.3% in 2011.

Languages in Rampurhat I CD block (2011)
1. Bengali (84.4%)
2. Santali (13.2%)
3. Khortha (1.58%)
4. Others (0.82%)

At the time of the 2011 census, 84.40% of the population spoke Bengali, 13.20% Santali and 1.58% Khortha as their first language.

== Rural poverty ==
As per the BPL household survey carried out in 2005, the proportion of BPL households in Rampurhat I CD Block was 53.9%, against 42.3% in Birbhum district. In six CD Blocks – Murarai II, Nalhati II, Rampurhat II, Rampurhat I, Suri II and Murarai I – the proportion of BPL families was more than 50%. In three CD Blocks – Rajnagar, Suri I and Labhpur – the proportion of BPL families was less than 30%. The other ten CD Blocks in Birbhum district were placed in between. According to the District Human Development Report, Birbhum, “Although there is no indication that the share of BPL households is more in blocks with higher share of agricultural labourer, there is a clear pattern that the share of BPL households is more in blocks with disadvantaged population in general and Muslim population in particular.” (The disadvantaged population includes SCs, STs and Muslims.)

== Economy ==
=== Livelihood ===
Livelihood
in Rampurhat I CD Block
1. Cultivators (19.1%)
2. Agricultural labourers (44.1%)
3. Household industries (2.48%)
4. Other Workers (34.3%)

In Ramhurhat I CD Block in 2011, amongst the class of total workers, cultivators numbered 14,391 and formed 19.09%, agricultural labourers numbered 33,264 and formed 44.12%, household industry workers numbered 1,870 and formed 2.48% and other workers numbered 25,876 and formed 34.32%. Total workers numbered 75,401 and formed 40.01% of the total population, and non-workers numbered 113,034 and formed 59.99% of the population.

Note: In the census records a person is considered a cultivator, if the person is engaged in cultivation/ supervision of land owned by self/government/institution. When a person who works on another person's land for wages in cash or kind or share, is regarded as an agricultural labourer. Household industry is defined as an industry conducted by one or more members of the family within the household or village, and one that does not qualify for registration as a factory under the Factories Act. Other workers are persons engaged in some economic activity other than cultivators, agricultural labourers and household workers. It includes factory, mining, plantation, transport and office workers, those engaged in business and commerce, teachers, entertainment artistes and so on.

=== Infrastructure ===
There are 116 inhabited villages in Rampurhat I CD Block, as per District Census Handbook, Birbhum, 2011. 100% villages have power supply. 115 villages (99.14%) have drinking water supply. 18 villages (15.52%) have post offices. 105 villages (90.52%) have telephones (including landlines, public call offices and mobile phones). 29 villages (25.00%) have a pucca (paved) approach road and 47 villages (40.52%) have transport communication (includes bus service, rail facility and navigable waterways). 11 villages (9.48%) have agricultural credit societies and 7 villages (6.03%) have banks.

=== Agriculture ===
Following land reforms land ownership pattern has undergone transformation. In 2004–05 (the agricultural labourer data is for 2001), persons engaged in agriculture in Rampurhat I CD Block could be classified as follows: bargadars 4,304 (8.41%), patta (document) holders 7,804 (15.25%), small farmers (possessing land between 1 and 2 hectares) 3,000 (5.86%), marginal farmers (possessing land up to 1 hectare) 9,000 (17.58%) and agricultural labourers 27,079 (52.90%).

Birbhum is a predominantly paddy cultivation-based agricultural district. The area under paddy cultivation in 2010-11 was 249,000 hectares of land. Paddy is grown in do, suna and sali classes of land. There is double to triple cropping system for paddy cultivation. Other crops grown in Birbhum are gram, masuri, peas, wheat, linseed, khesari, til, sugarcane and occasionally cotton. 192,470 hectares of cultivable land is under irrigation by different sources, such as canals, tanks, river lift irrigation and different types of tubewells. In 2009–10, 158,380 hectares were irrigated by canal water. There are such major irrigation projects as Mayurakshi and Hijli. Other rivers such as Ajoy, Brahmani, Kuskurni, Dwaraka, Hingla and Kopai are also helpful for irrigation in the district.

In 2013–14, there were 85 fertiliser depots, 30 seed stores and 77 fair price shops in Rampurhat I CD block.

In 2013–14, Rampurhat I CD block produced 146,370 tonnes of Aman paddy, the main winter crop, from 44,719 hectares, 8,626 tonnes of Boro paddy (spring crop) from 2,442 hectares, 10,768 tonnes of wheat from 3,684 hectares, 5,920 tonnes of potatoes from 209 hectares and 528 tonnes of sugar cane from 7 hectares. It also produced pulses and oilseeds.

In 2013–14, the total area irrigated in Rampurhat I CD block was 16,565 hectares, out of which 12,000 hectares were irrigated by canal water, 3,000 hectares by tank water, 400 hectares by river lift irrigation, 455 hectares by deep tube wells, 500 hectares by shallow tube wells, 10 hectares by open dug wells and 200 hectares by other means.

=== Banking ===
In 2013–14, Rampurhat I CD block had offices of 16 commercial banks and 4 gramin banks.

=== Other sectors ===
According to the District Human Development Report, 2009, Birbhum is one of the most backward districts of West Bengal in terms of industrial development. Of the new industrial projects set-up in West Bengal between 1991 and 2005, only 1.23% came to Birbhum. Bakreshwar Thermal Power Station is the only large-scale industry in the district and employs about 5,000 people. There are 4 medium-scale industries and 4,748 registered small-scale industries.

The proportion of workers engaged in agriculture in Birbhum has been decreasing. According to the District Human Development Report, “more people are now engaged in non-agricultural activities, such as fishing, retail sales, vegetable vending, selling milk, and so on. As all these activities are at the lower end of the spectrum of marketable skills, it remains doubtful if these activities generate enough return for their family’s sustenance.”

=== Backward Regions Grant Fund ===
Birbhum district is listed as a backward region and receives financial support from the Backward Regions Grant Fund. The fund, created by the Government of India, is designed to redress regional imbalances in development. As of 2012, 272 districts across the country were listed under this scheme. The list includes 11 districts of West Bengal.

== Transport ==
Rampurhat I CD block has 26 originating/ terminating bus routes.

The Khana-Barharwa section of Sahibganj loop passes through this block. There are stations at Rampurhat, Swadinpur and Tarapith Road.

Jasidih-Dumka-Rampurhat line originates from Rampurhat. There also are stations at Pinargaria and Adalpahari railway station.

NH 14, running from Rajgram to Midnapore, and National Highway 114A, passes through this block.

== Education ==
In 2013–14, Rampurhat I CD block had 146 primary schools with 13,048 students, 19 middle schools with 1,428 students, 7 high schools with 3,824 students and 9 higher secondary schools with 8,490 students. Rampurhat I CD Block had 3 technical/ professional institutions with 233 students and 341 institutions for special and non-formal education with 10,833 students. Rampurhat municipal area has 2 general degree colleges (outside the CD block).

As per the 2011 census, in Rampurhat I CD Block, amongst the 116 inhabited villages, 8 villages did not have a school, 41 villages had more than 1 primary school, 37 villages had at least 1 primary and 1 middle school and 14 villages had at least 1 middle and 1 secondary school. 8 villages had senior secondary schools.

== Healthcare ==
In 2014, Rampurhat I CD block had 1 hospital, 1 block primary health centre, 4 primary health centres and 1 private nursing home with total 355 beds and 36 doctors (excluding private bodies). It had 27 family welfare subcentres. 57,458 patients were treated indoor and 200,162 patients were treated outdoor in the hospitals, health centres and subcentres of the CD block. Additionally, Rampurhat municipal area had 1 central government/ PSU hospital and 11 private nursing homes.

As per 2011 census, in Rampurhat I CD Block, 2 villages had community health centres, 5 villages had primary health centres, 60 villages had primary health subcentres, 3 villages had maternity and child welfare centres, 1 village had a veterinary hospital, 7 villages had medicine shops and out of the 116 inhabited villages 49 villages had no medical facilities.

Category	Hospital Name	Post Office	Beds
Primary Health Centre	Kastagora PHC	Kastagora	6
Primary Health Centre	Baidara PHC	Haridaspur	10
Primary Health Centre	Udaypur PHC	Dekhuria	6
Primary Health Centre	Narayanpur PHC	Narayanpur	10
Block Primary Health Centre	Chakmandala BPHC	Chakmandala	15

== Notable people ==
- Mahammad Hannan, social worker and MLA for Rampurhat
