= Mayureswar =

- Village
- Location in West Bengal, India
- Coordinates: 23.99078°N 87.764734°E
- Country: India
- State: West Bengal
- District: Birbhum

Population (2011)
  - Total: 11,142

Languages
  - Official: Bengali, English
- Time zone: UTC+5:30 (IST)
- PIN: 731213 (Mayureswar)
- Telephone code: 03462
- Lok Sabha constituency: Bolpur
- Vidhan Sabha constituency: Mayureswar
- Website: birbhum.nic.in

Mayureswar is a village and gram panchayat in Mayureswar II CD Block in Rampurhat subdivision of Birbhum district in the Indian state of West Bengal.

== Name ==
The name Mayūreswar is derived from Sanskrit Mayūreśvara, which is itself the name of a temple by the Mayurakshi or Mor river. Other variants of the name include Maureswar and Moresar or Molesar.

== History ==
John Beames identified Mayureswar with the "Mudesar" of the Ain-i Akbari, which is listed as a mahal in sarkar Tanda. It was listed with an assessed revenue of 1,503,352 dams.

As of 1877, Mayureswar was described as the seat of the pargana of Darin Maureswar. The village's inhabitants were described as primarily engaged in sericulture and silk spinning.

== Geography ==
Cities and towns in Rampurhat subdivision of Birbhum district
M: municipal city/ town, CT: census town, R: rural/ urban centre.
Owing to space constraints in the small map, the actual locations in a larger map may vary slightly

=== Location ===
Kotasur, the CD Block headquarters, is 10 km away from Mayureswar. Suri, the district headquarters, is 30 km away.

=== Police station ===
Mayureswar police station has jurisdiction over Mayureswar I and Mayureswar II CD Blocks.

=== Gram panchayat ===
Villages in Mayureswar gram panchayat are: Brahmanbahara, Chaulja, Kamarhati, Kushtor, Mayureswar, Paramtor and Singari.

=== Overview ===
The northern portion of Rampurhat subdivision (shown in the map alongside) is part of the Nalhati Plains, a sub-micro physiographic region, and the southern portion is part of the Brahmani-Mayurakshi Basin, another sub-micro physiographic region occupying the area between the Brahmani in the north and the Mayurakshi in the south. There is an occasional intrusion of Rajmahal Hills, from adjoining Santhal Parganas, towards the north-western part of the subdivision. On the western side is Santhal Parganas and the border between West Bengal and Jharkhand can be seen in the map. Murshidabad district is on the eastern side. A small portion of the Padma River and the border with Bangladesh (thick line) can be seen in the north-eastern corner of the map. 96.62% of the population of Rampurhat subdivision live the rural areas and 3.38% of the population live in the urban areas.

Note: The map alongside presents some of the notable locations in the area. All places marked in the map are linked in the larger full screen map.

== Demographics ==
As per the 2011 Census of India, Mayureswar had a total population of 11,142 of which 5,650 (51%) were males and 5,492 (49%) were females. Population below 6 years was 1,502. The total number of literates in Mayureswar was 6,521 (67.65% of the population over 6 years).

== Transport ==
SH 11, running from Mohammad Bazar to Ranaghat, passes near Mayureswar. Nearest railway station is Gadadharpur.

== Post Office ==
Mayureswar has a delivery sub post office, with PIN 731213, under Suri head office. Branch offices using the same PIN are situated at Brahmanbahara, Chhamna, Chhototurigram, Daspalsa, Kaleswar, Kanutia, Kotasur, Kuliara, Kusumi, Mohurapur and Parulia.

== Culture ==
Kripanath Smriti Pathagar, a government-sponsored library at Mayureswar, was established in 1979. It has its own pucca building.
