= Chakmandala =

Chakmandala Mandala
- Village
- Location in West Bengal, India
- Coordinates: 24.198556°N 87.724944°E
- Country: India
- State: West Bengal
- District: Birbhum

Population (2011)
  - Total: 1,566

Languages
  - Official: Bengali, English
- Time zone: UTC+5:30 (IST)
- PIN: 731233
- Telephone/STD code: 03461
- Lok Sabha constituency: Birbhum
- Vidhan Sabha constituency: Rampurhat
- Website: birbhum.nic.in

Chakmandala is a village in Rampurhat I CD Block in Rampurhat subdivision of Birbhum district in the Indian state of West Bengal

== Geography ==
Cities and towns in Rampurhat subdivision of Birbhum district
M: municipal city/ town, CT: census town, R: rural/ urban centre.
Owing to space constraints in the small map, the actual locations in a larger map may vary slightly

The northern portion of Rampurhat subdivision (shown in the map alongside) is part of the Nalhati Plains, a sub-micro physiographic region, and the southern portion is part of the Brahmani-Mayurakshi Basin, another sub-micro physiographic region occupying the area between the Brahmani in the north and the Mayurakshi in the south. There is an occasional intrusion of Rajmahal Hills, from adjoining Santhal Parganas, towards the north-western part of the subdivision. On the western side is Santhal Parganas and the border between West Bengal and Jharkhand can be seen in the map. Murshidabad district is on the eastern side. A small portion of the Padma River and the border with Bangladesh (thick line) can be seen in the north-eastern corner of the map. 96.62% of the population of Rampurhat subdivision live the rural areas and 3.38% of the population live in the urban areas.

Note: The map alongside presents some of the notable locations in the area. All places marked in the map are linked in the larger full screen map.

== Demographics ==
As per the 2011 Census of India, Mandala had a total population of 1,566 of which 796 (51%) were males and 770 (49%) were females. Population below 6 years was 231. The total number of literates in Mandala was 769 (57.60% of the population over 6 years).

== Transport ==
A short stretch of Mandala-Debipur Road links Chakmandala to National Highway 114A. This section is locally known as Dumka-Rampurhat Road.

== Healthcare ==
Chakmandala Block Primary Health Centre has 15 beds. In 2012, the average monthly patients attending Chakmandala BPHC were 1,850 and average monthly admissions were 210. It handled 112 emergency admissions.
