= Mayureswar II =

- Community development block
- Location in West Bengal
- Coordinates: 24°04′14″N 87°33′25″E
- Country: India
- State: West Bengal
- District: Birbhum
- Parliamentary constituency: Bolpur
- Assembly constituency: Mayureswar

Area
  - Total: 156.27 km^{2} (60.34 sq mi)

Population (2011)
  - Total: 127,661
  - Density: 816.93/km^{2} (2,115.8/sq mi)
- Time zone: UTC+5.30 (IST)
- PIN: 731213
- Area code: +91 3462
- Literacy Rate: 70.89 per cent
- Website: http://birbhum.nic.in/

Mayureswar II is a community development block that forms an administrative division in Rampurhat subdivision of Birbhum district in the Indian state of West Bengal.

== Overview ==
Birbhum district is physiographically a part of the ancient Rarh region. The western portion of the district is basically an extension of the Chota Nagpur Plateau. The area has mostly loose reddish lateritic low fertility soil. In the east, the flood plains of the major rivers, such as the Ajay, Bakreshwar, Mayurakshi and Brahmani have soft alluvial soil. The forest cover is only 3.5% of the total district. Although coal is found in the district and Bakreshwar Thermal Power Station has a capacity of 2,010 MW, the economic condition of Birbhum is dominated by agriculture. From 1977 onwards major land reforms took place in West Bengal. Land in excess of land ceiling was acquired and distributed amongst the peasants. In Birbhum district, 19,968 hectares of vested agricultural land has been distributed amongst 161,515 beneficiaries, till 2011. However, more than 38% of the operational land holding is marginal or less than 1 acre. The proportion of agricultural labourers amongst total workers in Birbhum district is 45.9%, the highest amongst all districts of West Bengal. Culturally rich Birbhum, with such traditional landmarks as Jaydev Kenduli and Chandidas Nanoor, is home to Visva-Bharati University at Santiniketan, having close association with two Nobel laureates – Rabindranath Tagore and Amartya Sen.

== Geography ==
Map of Birbhum district showing CD blocks and municipal areas. Click on the map to view larger map.

Kotasur is located at 24°04′14″N 87°33′25″E.

Mayureswar II CD Block is part of the Brahmani-Mayurakshi Basin, one of the four sub-micro physiographic regions occupying the area between Brahmani River in the north and Mayurakshi River in the south.

Mayureshwar II CD Block is bounded by Mayureswar I CD Block on the north, Burwan CD Block, in Murshidabad district, on the east, Labpur CD Block on the south and Sainthia CD Block on the west.

Mayureswar II CD Block has an area of 156.27 km^{2}. It has 1 panchayat samity, 7 gram panchayats, 84 gram sansads (village councils), 131 mouzas and 126 inhabited villages, as per District Statistical Handbook Birbhum 2008. Mayureswar police station serves this block. Headquarters of this CD Block is at Kotasur.

Gram panchayats of Mayureswar II block/panchayat samiti are: Daspalsa, Dhekha, Kaleswar, Kundala, Mayureswar, Shatpalsa and Ulkunda.

== Demographics ==
=== Population ===
As per the 2011 Census of India, Mayureshwar II CD Block had a total population of 127,661, all of which were rural. There were 65,373 (51%) males and 62,288 (49%) females. Population below 6 years was 15,171. Scheduled Castes numbered 39,160 (30.67%) and Scheduled Tribes numbered 9,090 (7.12%).

As per 2001 census, Mayureswar II block had a total population of 113,050, out of which 58,175 were males and 54,875 were females. Mayureswar II block registered a population growth of 14.40 per cent during the 1991-2001 decade. Decadal growth for Birbhum district was 17.88 per cent. Decadal growth in West Bengal was 17.84 per cent.

Large villages (with 4,000+ population) in Mayursehwar II CD Block are (2011 census figures in brackets): Mayureswar (11,142), Kotasur (4,302) and Kanutia (6,572).

Other villages in Mayureshwar II CD Block include (2011 census figures in brackets): Ulkunda (2,704) Satpalsa (963), Daspalsa (1,621), Kundala (1,723), Kaleswar (1,333) and Dheka (539).

=== Literacy ===
As per the 2011 census the total number of literates in Mayureswar II CD Block was 79,749 (70.89% of the population over 6 years) out of which males numbered 45,028 (78.12% of the male population over 6 years) and females numbered 34,721 (63.31% of the female population over 6 years). The gender disparity (the difference between female and male literacy rates) was 14.81%.

See also – List of West Bengal districts ranked by literacy rate

Literacy in CD blocks of
Birbhum district
Rampurhat subdivision
Murarai I – 55.67%
Murarai II – 58.28%
Nalhati I – 69.83%
Nalhati II – 71.68%
Rampurhat I – 73.29%
Rampurhat II – 70.77%
Mayureswar I – 71.52%
Mayureswar II – 70.89%
Suri Sadar subdivision
Mohammad Bazar – 65.18%
Rajnagar – 68.10%
Suri I – 72.75%
Suri II – 72.75%
Sainthia – 72.33%
Dubrajpur – 68.26%
Khoyrasol – 68.75%
Bolpur subdivision
Bolpur Sriniketan – 70.67%
Ilambazar – 74.27%
Labpur – 71.20%
Nanoor – 69.45%
2011 Census: CD Block Wise

Primary Census Abstract Data

=== Language and religion ===
Religion in Mayureswar II CD block (2011)
Hinduism	74.06%
Islam	25.65%
Other or not stated	0.29%

In the 2011 census, Hindus numbered 94,544 and formed 74.06% of the population in Mayureswar II CD Block. Muslims numbered 32,741 and formed 25.65% of the population. Christians numbered 202 and formed 0.16% of the population. Others numbered 174 and formed 0.14% of the population.

The proportion of Hindus in Birbhum district has declined from 72.2% in 1961 to 62.3% in 2011. The proportion of Muslims in Birbhum district has increased from 27.6% to 37.1% during the same period. Christians formed 0.3% in 2011.

Languages in Mayureswar II CD block (2011)
1. Bengali (93.5%)
2. Santali (5.93%)
3. Others (0.62%)

At the time of the 2011 census, 93.45% of the population spoke Bengali and 5.93% Santali as their first language.

== Rural poverty ==
As per the BPL household survey carried out in 2005, the proportion of BPL households in Mayureswar II CD Block was 40.6%, against 42.3% in Birbhum district. In six CD Blocks – Murarai II, Nalhati II, Rampurhat II, Rampurhat I, Suri II and Murarai I – the proportion of BPL families was more than 50%. In three CD Blocks – Rajnagar, Suri I and Labhpur – the proportion of BPL families was less than 30%. The other ten CD Blocks in Birbhum district were placed in between. According to the District Human Development Report, Birbhum, “Although there is no indication that the share of BPL households is more in blocks with higher share of agricultural labourer, there is a clear pattern that the share of BPL households is more in blocks with disadvantaged population in general and Muslim population in particular.” (The disadvantaged population includes SCs, STs and Muslims.)

== Economy ==
=== Livelihood ===
Livelihood
in Mayureswar II CD Block
1. Cultivators (22.3%)
2. Agricultural labourers (47.3%)
3. Household industries (5.00%)
4. Other Workers (25.4%)

In Mayureswar II CD Block in 2011, amongst the class of total workers, cultivators numbered 13,251 and formed 22.27%, agricultural labourers numbered 28,146 and formed 47.29%, household industry workers numbered 2,975 and formed 5.00% and other workers numbered 15,141 and formed 25.44%. Total workers numbered 59,513 and formed 46.62% of the total population, and non-workers numbered 68,148 and formed 53.38% of the population.

Note: In the census records a person is considered a cultivator, if the person is engaged in cultivation/ supervision of land owned by self/government/institution. When a person who works on another person's land for wages in cash or kind or share, is regarded as an agricultural labourer. Household industry is defined as an industry conducted by one or more members of the family within the household or village, and one that does not qualify for registration as a factory under the Factories Act. Other workers are persons engaged in some economic activity other than cultivators, agricultural labourers and household workers. It includes factory, mining, plantation, transport and office workers, those engaged in business and commerce, teachers, entertainment artistes and so on.

=== Infrastructure ===
There are 125 inhabited villages in Mayureswar II CD Block, as per District Census Handbook, Birbhum, 2011. 100% villages have power supply. 125 villages (100%) have drinking water supply. 20 villages (16.00%) have post offices. 106 villages (84.80%) have telephones (including landlines, public call offices and mobile phones). 55 villages (44.00%) have a pucca (paved) approach road and 68 villages (54.40%) have transport communication (includes bus service, rail facility and navigable waterways). 8 villages (6.40%) have agricultural credit societies and 6 villages (4.80%) have banks.

=== Agriculture ===
Following land reforms land ownership pattern has undergone transformation. In 2004-05 (the agricultural labourer data is for 2001), persons engaged in agriculture in Mayureswar II CD Block could be classified as follows: bargadars 2,901 (7.36%), patta (document) holders 7,255 (18.41%), small farmers (possessing land between 1 and 2 hectares) 4,400 (11.16%), marginal farmers (possessing land up to 1 hectare) 7,945 (20.16%) and agricultural labourers 16,912 (42.91%).

Birbhum is a predominantly paddy cultivation-based agricultural district. The area under paddy cultivation in 2010-11 was 249,000 hectares of land. Paddy is grown in do, suna and sali classes of land. There is double to triple cropping system for paddy cultivation. Other crops grown in Birbhum are gram, masuri, peas, wheat, linseed, khesari, til, sugarcane and occasionally cotton. 192,470 hectares of cultivable land is under irrigation by different sources, such as canals, tanks, river lift irrigation and different types of tubewells. In 2009–10, 158,380 hectares were irrigated by canal water. There are such major irrigation projects as Mayurakshi and Hijli. Other rivers such as Ajoy, Brahmani, Kuskurni, Dwaraka, Hingla and Kopai are also helpful for irrigation in the district.

In 2013–14, there were 75 fertiliser depots, 15 seed stores and 39 fair price shops in Mayureswar II CD block.

In 2013–14, Mayureswar II CD block produced 34,281 tonnes of Aman paddy, the main winter crop, from 11,521 hectares, 544 tonnes of Aus paddy (summer crop) from 208 hectares, 10,031 tonnes of Boro paddy (spring crop) from 2,700 hectares, 3,757 tonnes of wheat from 1,202 hectares, 508 tonnes of jute from 26 hectares, 33,162 tonnes of potatoes from 1,745 hectares and 5,056 tonnes of sugar cane from 102 hectares. It also produced pulses and oilseeds.

In 2013–14, the total area irrigated in Mayureswar II CD block was 25,995 hectares, out of which 10,705 hectares were irrigated by canal water, 2,725 hectares by tank water, 120 hectares by river lift irrigation, 10,850 hectares by deep tube wells, 1,360 hectares by shallow tube wells and 235 hectares by other means.

=== Banking ===
In 2013–14, Mayureswar II CD block had offices of 3 commercial banks and 3 gramin banks.

=== Other sectors ===
According to the District Human Development Report, 2009, Birbhum is one of the most backward districts of West Bengal in terms of industrial development. Of the new industrial projects set-up in West Bengal between 1991 and 2005, only 1.23% came to Birbhum. Bakreshwar Thermal Power Station is the only large-scale industry in the district and employs about 5,000 people. There are 4 medium-scale industries and 4,748 registered small-scale industries.

The proportion of workers engaged in agriculture in Birbhum has been decreasing. According to the District Human Development Report, “more people are now engaged in non-agricultural activities, such as fishing, retail sales, vegetable vending, selling milk, and so on. As all these activities are at the lower end of the spectrum of marketable skills, it remains doubtful if these activities generate enough return for their family’s sustenance.”

=== Backward Regions Grant Fund ===
Birbhum district is listed as a backward region and receives financial support from the Backward Regions Grant Fund. The fund, created by the Government of India, is designed to redress regional imbalances in development. As of 2012, 272 districts across the country were listed under this scheme. The list includes 11 districts of West Bengal.

== Transport ==
Mayureswar II CD block has 2 ferry services and 7 originating/ terminating bus routes. The nearest railway station is 10 km from the CD block headquarters.

SH 11, running from Mohammad Bazar to Ranaghata, passes through this block.

== Culture ==
Poush Sankranti fair is held at Shibpur in the Mayureswar police station. Gosaidas fair is held at Dakshingram. Dharma pujo fair is held at Ratma on the occasion of Buddha Purnima.

The Sarbomongola Temple is located at Kundala. Its floor is made of white stone brought from Rajasthan. Nobody knows how old the temple is. This temple is the pride of this district. Once Sadhak Bamakhyapa of Tarapith came here and worshipped the Goddess here.

Rath Bari of Kundala is well known for its architectural beauty. A Rath Fair is held at Kundala on the eve of Rath Yatra. This fair is nearly 100 years old. Thousands of people from the surrounding villages throng to celebrate Rath Yatra at Kundala, one of the oldest villages in the district of Birbhum. Besides, at Kundala Borobari Durgapuja is 300 years old. The name and fame of this ancient village spread all over the district. Babu Janaki Nath Mukhopadhyay and his three sons namely Babu Ramaprasanna Mukhopadhyay, Rai Rajani Bhushan Mukhopadhyay bahadur, Babu Annada Prasanna Mukhopadhyay led a pivotal role in developing not only the surrounding area but also the entire district. This is perhaps the only village in the district where two separate primary schools for the boys and the girls were set up by the Zamindars.

== Education ==
In 2013–14, Mayureswar II CD block had 89 primary schools with 6,742 students, 16 middle schools with 1,244 students, 8 high schools with 4,724 students and 5 higher secondary schools with 8,594 students. Mayureswar II CD Block had 1 general degree college with 585 students, 2 technical/ professional institutions with 75 students and 227 institutions for special and non-formal education with 8,872 students

As per the 2011 census, in Mayursewar II CD Block, amongst the 120 inhabited villages, 25 villages did not have a school, 34 villages had more than 1 primary school, 34 villages had at least 1 primary and 1 middle school and 17 villages had at least 1 middle and 1 secondary school. 8 villages had senior secondary schools. There was 1 college for arts science and commerce in Mayureswar II CD Block.

Lokepara Mahavidyalaya was established at Lokpara in 2010.

Colleges:

- Lokepara Mahavidyalaya
- Shyamapada Das College Of Education(B.Ed. & D.El.Ed)
- Kaleswar Academy(B.Ed. & D.El.Ed)

== Healthcare ==
In 2014, Muyureswar II CD block had 1 rural hospital and 3 primary health centres with total 52 beds and 4 doctors (excluding private bodies). It had 20 family welfare subcentres. 1,418 patients were treated indoor and 73,366 patients were treated outdoor in the hospitals, health centres and subcentres of the CD block.

As per 2011 census, in Mayureswar II CD Block, 3 villages had primary health centres, 20 villages had primary health subcentres, 7 villages had maternity and child welfare centres, 2 villages had veterinary hospitals, 12 villages had medicine shops and out of the 120 inhabited villages 74 villages had no medical facilities.

Satpalsa (Basudebpur) Rural Hospital at PO Basudebpur has 30 beds. There are primary health centres at Noapara-Ulkunda (PO Gunutia) (10 beds), Dheka (PO Kuliara) (6 beds) and Hatinagar (PO Kotasur) (6 beds).
