= Murarai II =

- Community development block
- Interactive map of Murarai II
- Coordinates: 24.425833°N 87.960167°E
- Country: India
- State: West Bengal
- District: Birbhum
- Parliamentary constituency: Birbhum
- Assembly constituency: Murarai, Nalhati

Area
  - Total: 185.33 km^{2} (71.56 sq mi)

Population (2011)
  - Total: 222,033
  - Density: 1,198.0/km^{2} (3,102.9/sq mi)
- Time zone: UTC+5.30 (IST)
- PIN: 731221 (Paikar)
- Telephone/STD code: 03465
- Literacy Rate: 58.28 per cent
- Website: http://birbhum.nic.in/

Murarai II is a community development block that forms an administrative division in Rampurhat subdivision of Birbhum district in the Indian state of West Bengal.

== Overview ==
Birbhum district is physiographically a part of the ancient Rarh region. The western portion of the district is basically an extension of the Chota Nagpur Plateau. The area has mostly loose reddish lateritic low fertility soil. In the east, the flood plains of the major rivers, such as the Ajay, Bakreshwar, Mayurakshi and Brahmani have soft alluvial soil. The forest cover is only 3.5% of the total district. Although coal is found in the district and Bakreshwar Thermal Power Station has a capacity of 2,010 MW, the economic condition of Birbhum is dominated by agriculture. From 1977 onwards majorland reforms took place in West Bengal. Land in excess of land ceiling was acquired and distributed amongst the peasants. In Birbhum district, 19,968 hectares of vested agricultural land has been distributed amongst 161,515 beneficiaries, till 2011. However, more than 38% of the operational land holding is marginal or less than 1 acre. The proportion of agricultural labourers amongst total workers in Birbhum district is 45.9%, the highest amongst all districts of West Bengal. Culturally rich Birbhum, with such traditional landmarks as Jaydev Kenduli and Chandidas Nanoor, is home to Visva-Bharati University at Santiniketan, having close association with two Nobel laureates – Rabindranath Tagore and Amartya Sen.

== Geography ==
Map of Birbhum district showing CD blocks and municipal areas. Click on the map to view larger map.

Mitrapur, a constituent panchayat of Murarai II block, is located at 24.425833°N 87.960167°E.

Murarai II Block is part of the Nalhati Plain, one of the four sub-micro physiographic regions occupying the northern portion of Birbhum district.

Murarai II CD Block is bounded by Suti I CD Block, in Murshidabad district, on the north, Raghunathganj I CD Block, in Murshidabad district, in the east, Nalhati I and Nalhati II CD Blocks on the south and Murarai I CD Block on the west.

Murarai II CD Block has an area of 185.33 km^{2}. It has 1 panchayat samity, 9 gram panchayats, 87 gram sansads (village councils), 70 mouzas and 66 inhabited villages. Murarai police station serves this block. Headquarters of this CD Block is at Paikar.

Gram panchayats of Murarai II block/panchayat samiti are: Amdole, Jajigram, Kushmore I, Kushmore II, Mitrapur, Nandigram, Paikar I, Paikar II and Rudranagar.

== Demographics ==
=== Population ===
As per the 2011 Census of India, Murarai II CD Block had a total population of 222,033, of which 212,237 were rural and 9,796 were urban. There were 112,987 (51%) males and 109,046 (49%) females. Population below 6 years was 34,558. Scheduled Castes numbered 40,051 (18.04%) and Scheduled Tribes numbered 1,194 (0.54%).

As per 2001 census, Murarai II block had a total population of 177,730, out of which 90,522 were males and 87,208 were females. Murarai II block registered a population growth of 22.65 per cent during the 1991-2001 decade. Decadal growth for Birbhum district was 17.88 per cent. Decadal growth in West Bengal was 17.84 per cent.

Census Town in Murarai II CD Block is (2011 census figure in brackets): Kashimnagar (9,796).

Large villages (with 4,000+ population) in Murarai II CD Block are (2011 census figures in brackets): Makhlispur (6,373), Kathia (8,465), Amdol (5,976), Harsipur (5,128), Jijigram (6,977), Kamarkhul (4,598), Paikar (12,250), Mitrapur (15,452), Dantura (6,870), Bisor (5,181), Rudranagar (10,756), Danghara (4,070), Amudda (4,200), Math Basori (6,343) and Kutubpur (4,108).

Other villages in Murarai II CD Block include (2011 census figures in brackets): Kushmor (3,062).

=== Literacy ===
As per the 2011 census the total number of literates in Murarai II CD Block was 109,260 (58.28% of the population over 6 years) out of which males numbered 59,886 (62.80% of the male population over 6 years) and females numbered 49,374 (53.60% of the female population over 6 years). The gender disparity (the difference between female and male literacy rates) was 9.19%.

See also – List of West Bengal districts ranked by literacy rate

Literacy in CD blocks of
Birbhum district
Rampurhat subdivision
Murarai I – 55.67%
Murarai II – 58.28%
Nalhati I – 69.83%
Nalhati II – 71.68%
Rampurhat I – 73.29%
Rampurhat II – 70.77%
Mayureswar I – 71.52%
Mayureswar II – 70.89%
Suri Sadar subdivision
Mohammad Bazar – 65.18%
Rajnagar – 68.10%
Suri I – 72.75%
Suri II – 72.75%
Sainthia – 72.33%
Dubrajpur – 68.26%
Khoyrasol – 68.75%
Bolpur subdivision
Bolpur Sriniketan – 70.67%
Ilambazar – 74.27%
Labpur – 71.20%
Nanoor – 69.45%
2011 Census: CD Block Wise

Primary Census Abstract Data

=== Language and religion ===
Religion in Murarai II CD block (2011)
Islam	75.00%
Hinduism	24.91%
Other or not stated	0.09%

In the 2011 census, Muslims numbered 166,526 and formed 75.00% of the population in Murarai II CD Block. Hindus numbered 55,302 and formed 24.91% of the population. Christians numbered 144 and formed 0.06% of the population. Others numbered 61 and formed 0.03% of the population.

The proportion of Hindus in Birbhum district has declined from 72.2% in 1961 to 62.3% in 2011. The proportion of Muslims in Birbhum district has increased from 27.6% to 37.1% during the same period. Christians formed 0.3% in 2011.

Bengali is the predominant language, spoken by 99.80% of the population.

== Rural poverty ==
As per the BPL household survey carried out in 2005, the proportion of households below the poverty line (BPL) in Murarai II CD Block was 78.0%, against 42.3% in Birbhum district. In six CD Blocks – Murarai II, Nalhati II, Rampurhat II, Rampurhat I, Suri II and Murarai I – the proportion of BPL families was more than 50%. In three CD Blocks – Rajnagar, Suri I and Labhpur – the proportion of BPL families was less than 30%. The other ten CD Blocks in Birbhum district were placed in between. According to the District Human Development Report, Birbhum, "Although there is no indication that the share of BPL households is more in blocks with higher share of agricultural labourer, there is a clear pattern that the share of BPL households is more in blocks with disadvantaged population in general and Muslim population in particular." (The disadvantaged population includes scheduled castes, scheduled tribes, and Muslims.)

== Economy ==
=== Livelihood ===
Livelihood
in Murarai II CD Block
1. Cultivators (12.9%)
2. Agricultural labourers (53.7%)
3. Household industries (11.9%)
4. Other Workers (21.4%)

In Murarai II CD Block in 2011, amongst the class of total workers, cultivators numbered 10,174 and formed 12.95%, agricultural labourers numbered 42,181 and formed 53.68%, household industry workers numbered 9,366 and formed 11.92% and other workers numbered 16,858 and formed 21.45%. Total workers numbered 62,353 and formed 55.19% of the total population, and non-workers numbered 50,634 and formed 44.81% of the population.

Note: In the census records a person is considered a cultivator, if the person is engaged in cultivation/ supervision of land owned by self/government/institution. When a person who works on another person’s land for wages in cash or kind or share, is regarded as an agricultural labourer. Household industry is defined as an industry conducted by one or more members of the family within the household or village, and one that does not qualify for registration as a factory under the Factories Act. Other workers are persons engaged in some economic activity other than cultivators, agricultural labourers and household workers. It includes factory, mining, plantation, transport and office workers, those engaged in business and commerce, teachers, entertainment artistes and so on.

=== Infrastructure ===
There are 66 inhabited villages in Murarai II CD Block, as per District Census Handbook, Birbhum, 2011. 100% villages have power supply. 66 villages (100%) have drinking water supply. 12 villages (18.18%) have post offices. 53 villages (80.30%) have telephones (including landlines, public call offices and mobile phones). 37 villages (56.06%) have a pucca (paved) approach road and 30 villages (45.45%) have transport communication (includes bus service, rail facility and navigable waterways). 16 villages (24.24%) have agricultural credit societies and 5 villages (7.58%) have banks.

=== Agriculture ===
Following land reforms land ownership pattern has undergone transformation. In 2004-05 (the agricultural labourer data is for 2001), persons engaged in agriculture in Murarai II CD Block could be classified as follows: bargadars 2,926 (5.89%), patta (document) holders 6,627 (13.35%), small farmers (possessing land between 1 and 2 hectares) 7,360 (14.82%), marginal farmers (possessing land up to 1 hectare) 10,580 (21.31%) and agricultural labourers 22,166 (44.64%).

Birbhum is a predominantly paddy cultivation-based agricultural district. The area under paddy cultivation in 2010-11 was 249,000 hectares of land. Paddy is grown in do, suna and sali classes of land. There is double to triple cropping system for paddy cultivation. Other crops grown in Birbhum are gram, masuri, peas, wheat, linseed, khesari, til, sugarcane and occasionally cotton. 192,470 hectares of cultivable land is under irrigation by different sources, such as canals, tanks, river lift irrigation and different types of tubewells. In 2009-10, 158,380 hectares were irrigated by canal water. There are such major irrigation projects as Mayurakshi and Hijli. Other rivers such as Ajoy, Brahmani, Kuskurni, Dwaraka, Hingla and Kopai are also helpful for irrigation in the district.

In 2013-14, there were 39 fair price shops in Murarai II CD block.

In 2013-14, Murarai II CD block produced 3,433 tonnes of Aman paddy, the main winter crop, from 1,277 hectares, 12,525 tonnes of Boro paddy (spring crop) from 3,650 hectares, 11,109 tonnes of wheat from 3,300 hectares, 16,246 tonnes of jute from 831 hectares, 27,354 tonnes of potatoes from 949 hectares and 826 tonnes of sugar cane from 11 hectares. It also produced pulses and oilseeds.

In 2013-14, the total area irrigated in Murarai II CD block was 6,450 hectares, out of which 1,500 hectares were irrigated by canal water, 1,900 hectares by tank water, 500 hectares by river lift irrigation, 2,475 hectares by deep tube wells and 75 hectares by open dug wells.

=== Banking ===
In 2013-14, Murarai II CD block had offices of 4 commercial banks and 2 gramin banks.

=== Other sectors ===
According to the District Human Development Report, 2009, Birbhum is one of the most backward districts of West Bengal in terms of industrial development. Of the new industrial projects set-up in West Bengal between 1991 and 2005, only 1.23% came to Birbhum. Bakreshwar Thermal Power Station is the only large-scale industry in the district and employs about 5,000 people. There are 4 medium-scale industries and 4,748 registered small-scale industries.

The proportion of workers engaged in agriculture in Birbhum has been decreasing. According to the District Human Development Report, “more people are now engaged in non-agricultural activities, such as fishing, retail sales, vegetable vending, selling milk, and so on. As all these activities are at the lower end of the spectrum of marketable skills, it remains doubtful if these activities generate enough return for their family’s sustenance.”

=== Backward Regions Grant Fund ===
Birbhum district is listed as a backward region and receives financial support from the Backward Regions Grant Fund. The fund, created by the Government of India, is designed to redress regional imbalances in development. As of 2012, 272 districts across the country were listed under this scheme. The list includes 11 districts of West Bengal.

== Transport ==
Murarai II CD block has 3 ferry services and 13 originating/ terminating bus routes. The nearest railway station is 8 km from block headquarters.

Raghunathpur-Murarai Road and Chatra-Hyatnagar Road cross near Paikar.

== Education ==
In 2013-14, Murarai II CD block had 87 primary schools with 16,271 students, 27 middle schools with 1,093 students, 8 high schools with 10,012 students and 8 higher secondary schools with 8,595 students. Murarai II CD Block had 1 technical/ professional institution with 62 students and 305 institutions for special and non-formal education with 18,259 students

As per the 2011 census, in Murarai II CD Block, amongst the 66 inhabited villages, all villages had a school, 34 villages had more than 1 primary school, 28 villages had at least 1 primary and 1 middle school and 15 villages had at least 1 middle and 1 secondary school. 9 villages had senior secondary schools. There was a degree college of art science and commerce in Murarai II CD Block.

== Healthcare ==
In 2014, Murarai II CD Block had 1 rural hospital and 4 primary health centres with total 52 beds and 8 doctors (excluding private bodies). It had 29 family welfare subcentres. 9,771 patients were treated indoor and 111,875 patients were treated outdoor in the hospitals, health centres and subcentres of the CD block.

As per 2011 census, in Murarai II CD Block, 6 villages had primary health centres, 24 villages had primary health subcentres, 4 villages had maternity and child welfare centres, 1 village had a veterinary hospital, 7 villages had medicine shops and out of the 66 inhabited villages 32 villages had no medical facilities.

Paikar Rural Hospital at Paikar has 30 beds. There are primary health centres at Jajigram (10 beds), Rudranagar (10 beds) and Bhimpur (6 beds).
