= Satpalsa =

- Village
- Location in West Bengal, India
- Coordinates: 23.91678°N 87.795734°E
- Country: India
- State: West Bengal
- District: Birbhum

Population (2011)
  - Total: 963

Languages
  - Official: Bengali, English
- Time zone: UTC+5:30 (IST)
- Postal code: 731234 (731213)
- Telephone code: 03462
- Lok Sabha constituency: Bolpur
- Vidhan Sabha constituency: Mayureswar
- Website: birbhum.nic.in

Satpalsa is a village in Mayureswar II CD Block in Rampurhat subdivision of Birbhum district in the Indian state of West Bengal.

== Geography ==
Cities and towns in Rampurhat subdivision of Birbhum district
M: municipal city/ town, CT: census town, R: rural/ urban centre.
Owing to space constraints in the small map, the actual locations in a larger map may vary slightly

=== Location ===
23.91678°N 87.795734°E.

The Mayurakshi flows nearby.

=== Overview ===
The northern portion of Rampurhat subdivision (shown in the map alongside) is part of the Nalhati Plains, a sub-micro physiographic region, and the southern portion is part of the Brahmani-Mayurakshi Basin, another sub-micro physiographic region occupying the area between the Brahmani in the north and the Mayurakshi in the south. There is an occasional intrusion of Rajmahal Hills, from adjoining Santhal Parganas, towards the north-western part of the subdivision. On the western side is Santhal Parganas and the border between West Bengal and Jharkhand can be seen in the map. Murshidabad district is on the eastern side. A small portion of the Padma River and the border with Bangladesh (thick line) can be seen in the north-eastern corner of the map. 96.62% of the population of Rampurhat subdivision live the rural areas and 3.38% of the population live in the urban areas.

Note: The map alongside presents some of the notable locations in the area. All places marked in the map are linked in the larger full screen map.

== Demographics ==
As per the 2011 Census of India, Satpalsa had a total population of 963 of which 502 (52%) were males and 461 (48%) were females. Population below 6 years was 100. The total number of literates in Satpalsa was 702 (81.34% of the population over 6 years).

== Education ==
Satpalsa High School is a Bengali-medium co-educational school, with facilities for teaching from class V to class XII. It was established in 1948.

== Healthcare ==
Satpalsa (Basudebpur) Rural Hospital at PO Basudebpur has 30 beds.
