= Rajnagar (community development block) =

- Community development block
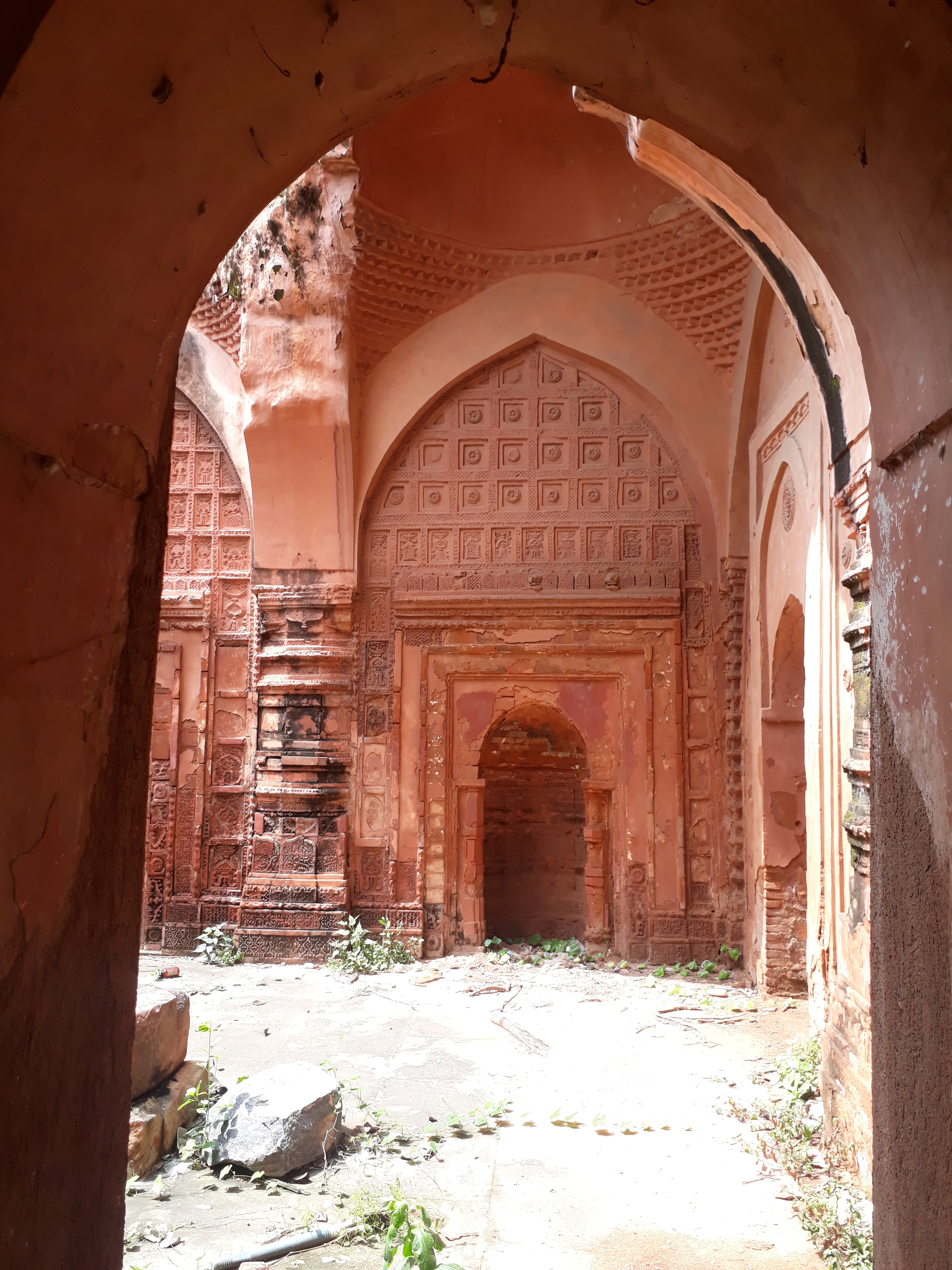
- Rajnagar Motichur Mosque with terracotta decoration

- Location in West Bengal
- Coordinates: 23°57′N 87°19′E
- Country: India
- State: West Bengal
- District: Birbhum
- Parliamentary constituency: Birbhum
- Assembly constituency: Suri

Area
  - Total: 221.47 km^{2} (85.51 sq mi)

Population (2011)
  - Total: 77,979
  - Density: 352.10/km^{2} (911.93/sq mi)
- Time zone: UTC+5.30 (IST)
- Literacy Rate: 68.10 per cent
- Website: http://birbhum.nic.in/

Rajnagar is a community development block that forms an administrative division in Suri Sadar subdivision of Birbhum district in the Indian state of West Bengal.

== Overview ==
Birbhum district is physiographically a part of the ancient Rarh region. The western portion of the district is basically an extension of the Chota Nagpur Plateau. The area has mostly loose reddish lateritic low fertility soil. In the east, the flood plains of the major rivers, such as the Ajay, Bakreshwar, Mayurakshi and Brahmani, have soft alluvial soil. The forest cover is only 3.5% of the total district. Although coal is found in the district and Bakreshwar Thermal Power Station has a capacity of 2,010 MW, the economic condition of Birbhum is dominated by agriculture. From 1977 onwards majorland reforms took place in West Bengal. Land in excess of land ceiling was acquired and distributed amongst the peasants. In Birbhum district, 19,968 hectares of vested agricultural land has been distributed amongst 161,515 beneficiaries, till 2011. However, more than 38% of the operational land holding is marginal or less than 1 acre. The proportion of agricultural labourers amongst total workers in Birbhum district is 45.9%, the highest amongst all districts of West Bengal. Culturally rich Birbhum, with such traditional landmarks as Jaydev Kenduli and Chandidas Nanoor, is home to Visva-Bharati University at Santiniketan, having close association with two Nobel laureates – Rabindranath Tagore and Amartya Sen.

== Geography ==
Map of Birbhum district showing CD blocks and municipal areas. Click on the map to view larger map.

Rajnagar is located at 23°57′N 87°19′E.

Rajnagar CD Block is part of the Bakreshwar Upland, one of the four sub-micro physiographic regions occupying the western portion of the district. This area is a heavily dissected extension of the plateau region of Santhal Parganas. The undulating area rises to high ridges on the western boundary with Jharkhand.

Rajnagar CD Block is bounded by Ranishwar CD Block, in Dumka district of Jharkhand, on the north, Suri I CD Block on the east, Dubrajpur and Khoyrasol CD Blocks on the south and Kundhit CD Block, in Jamtara district of Jharkhand, on the west.

Rajnagar CD Block has an area of 221.47 km^{2}. It has 1 panchayat samity, 6 gram panchayats, 41-gram sansads (village councils), 99 mouzas and 89 inhabited villages, as per District Statistical Handbook Birbhum 2008. Rajnagar police station serves this block. Headquarters of this CD Block is at Rajnagar.

Gram panchayats of Rajnagar block/panchayat samiti are: Bhabanipur, Chandrapur, Gangmuri-Joypur, Rajnagar and Tantipara.

== Demographics ==
=== Population ===
As per the 2011 Census of India, Rajnagar CD Block had a total population of 77,979, of which 64,014 were rural and 13,965 were urban. There were 39,805 (51%) males and 38,174 (49%) females. Population below 6 years was 9,912. Scheduled Castes numbered 27,226 (34.91%) and Scheduled Tribes numbered 12,457 (15.97%).

As per 2001 census, Rajnagar block had a total population of 79,698, out of which 40,545 were males and 39,153 were females. Rajnagar block registered a population growth of 13.26 per cent during the 1991-2001 decade. Decadal growth for Birbhum district was 17.88 per cent. Decadal growth in West Bengal was 17.84 per cent.

Census Town in Rajnagar CD Block is 2 of (2011 census figure in brackets): Rajnagar (13,965). and Tantipara 16,227

Large census town (with 15,000+ population) in Rajnagar CD Block Big census town is (2011 census figure in brackets): Tantipara (16,227).

Other villages in Rajnagar CD Block include (2011 census figures in brackets): Gangmuri (1,853), Bhabanipur (794), Chandrapur (2,012) and Jaypur (616).

=== Literacy ===
As per the 2011 census the total number of literates in Rajnagar CD Block was 46,355 (68.10% of the population over 6 years) out of which males numbered 26,556 (76.45% of the male population over 6 years) and females numbered 19,799 (59.40% of the female population over 6 years). The gender disparity (the difference between female and male literacy rates) was 17.05%.

See also – List of West Bengal districts ranked by literacy rate

Literacy in CD blocks of
Birbhum district
Rampurhat subdivision
Murarai I – 55.67%
Murarai II – 58.28%
Nalhati I – 69.83%
Nalhati II – 71.68%
Rampurhat I – 73.29%
Rampurhat II – 70.77%
Mayureswar I – 71.52%
Mayureswar II – 70.89%
Suri Sadar subdivision
Mohammad Bazar – 65.18%
Rajnagar – 68.10%
Suri I – 72.75%
Suri II – 72.75%
Sainthia – 72.33%
Dubrajpur – 68.26%
Khoyrasol – 68.75%
Bolpur subdivision
Bolpur Sriniketan – 70.67%
Ilambazar – 74.27%
Labpur – 71.20%
Nanoor – 69.45%
2011 Census: CD Block Wise

Primary Census Abstract Data

=== Language and religion ===
Religion in Rajnagar CD block (2011)
Hinduism	84.74%
Islam	14.27%
Sarna	0.69%
Other or not stated	0.30%

In the 2011 census, Hindus numbered 66,082 and formed 84.74% of the population in Rajnagar CD Block. Muslims numbered 11,126 and formed 14.27% of the population. Christians numbered 119 and formed 0.15% of the population. Others numbered 652 and formed 0.84% of the population.

The proportion of Hindus in Birbhum district has declined from 72.2% in 1961 to 62.3% in 2011. The proportion of Muslims in Birbhum district has increased from 27.6% to 37.1% during the same period. Christians formed 0.3% in 2011.

Languages in Rajnagar CD block (2011)
1. Bengali (83.2%)
2. Santali (13.1%)
3. Hindi (2.21%)
4. Others (1.52%)

At the time of the 2011 census, 83.15% of the population spoke Bengali, 13.12% Santali and 2.21% Hindi as their first language.

== Rural poverty ==
As per the BPL household survey carried out in 2005, the proportion of BPL households in Rajnagar CD Block was 25.3%, against 42.3% in Birbhum district. In six CD Blocks – Murarai II, Nalhati II, Rampurhat II, Rampurhat I, Suri II and Murarai I – the proportion of BPL families was more than 50%. In three CD Blocks – Rajnagar, Suri I and Labhpur – the proportion of BPL families was less than 30%. The other ten CD Blocks in Birbhum district were placed in between. According to the District Human Development Report, Birbhum, “Although there is no indication that the share of BPL households is more in blocks with higher share of agricultural labourer, there is a clear pattern that the share of BPL households is more in blocks with disadvantaged population in general and Muslim population in particular.” (The disadvantaged population includes SCs, STs and Muslims.)

== Economy ==
=== Livelihood ===
Livelihood
in Rajnagar CD Block
1. Cultivators (16.3%)
2. Agricultural labourers (47.1%)
3. Household industries (6.70%)
4. Other Workers (29.9%)

In Rajnagar CD Block in 2011, amongst the class of total workers, cultivators numbered 5,574 and formed 16.28%, agricultural labourers numbered 16,132 and formed 47.13%, household industry workers numbered 2,294 and formed 6.70% and other workers numbered 10,232 and formed 29.89%. Total workers numbered 34,232 and formed 42.90% of the total population, and non-workers numbered 43,747 and formed 56.10% of the population.

Note: In the census records a person is considered a cultivator, if the person is engaged in cultivation/ supervision of land owned by self/government/institution. When a person who works on another person's land for wages in cash or kind or share, is regarded as an agricultural labourer. Household industry is defined as an industry conducted by one or more members of the family within the household or village, and one that does not qualify for registration as a factory under the Factories Act. Other workers are persons engaged in some economic activity other than cultivators, agricultural labourers and household workers. It includes factory, mining, plantation, transport and office workers, those engaged in business and commerce, teachers, entertainment artistes and so on.

=== Infrastructure ===
There are 88 inhabited villages in Rajnagar CD Block, as per District Census Handbook, Birbhum, 2011. 100% villages have power supply. 86 villages (97.30%) have drinking water supply. 11 villages (12.50%) have post offices. 83 villages (94.32%) have telephones (including landlines, public call offices and mobile phones). 34 villages (38.64%) have a pucca (paved) approach road and 43 villages (48.86%) have transport communication (includes bus service, rail facility and navigable waterways). 4 villages (4.55%) have agricultural credit societies and 1 village (1.14%) has a bank.

=== Agriculture ===
Following land reforms land ownership pattern has undergone transformation. In 2004-05 (the agricultural labourer data is for 2001), persons engaged in agriculture in Rajnagar CD Block could be classified as follows: bargadars 7,080 (20.92%), patta (document) holders 5,807 (17.16%), small farmers (possessing land between 1 and 2 hectares) 3,275 (9.68%), marginal farmers (possessing land up to 1 hectare) 6,850 (20.24%) and agricultural labourers 10,838 (32.02%).

Birbhum is a predominantly paddy cultivation-based agricultural district. The area under paddy cultivation in 2010-11 was 249,000 hectares of land. Paddy is grown in do, suna and sali classes of land. There is double to triple cropping system for paddy cultivation. Other crops grown in Birbhum are gram, masuri, peas, wheat, linseed, khesari, til, sugarcane and occasionally cotton. 192,470 hectares of cultivable land is under irrigation by different sources, such as canals, tanks, river lift irrigation and different types of tubewells. In 2009-10, 158,380 hectares were irrigated by canal water. There are such major irrigation projects as Mayurakshi and Hijli. Other rivers such as Ajoy, Brahmani, Kuskurni, Dwaraka, Hingla and Kopai are also helpful for irrigation in the district.

In 2013-14, there were 25 fair price shops in Rajnagar CD block.

In 2013-14, Rajnagar CD block produced 2,980 tonnes of Aman paddy, the main winter crop, from 1,353 hectares, 1,181 tonnes of wheat from 473 hectares and 3,030 tonnes of potatoes from 116 hectares. It also produced pulses and oilseeds.

In 2013-14, the total area irrigated in Rajnagar CD block was 1,419 hectares, out of which 1,399 hectares were irrigated by tank water, 10 hectares by river lift irrigation and 10 hectares by open dug wells.

=== Banking ===
In 2013-14, Rajnagar CD block had offices of 7 commercial banks and 3 gramin banks.

=== Other sectors ===
According to the District Human Development Report, 2009, Birbhum is one of the most backward districts of West Bengal in terms of industrial development. Of the new industrial projects set-up in West Bengal between 1991 and 2005, only 1.23% came to Birbhum. Bakreshwar Thermal Power Station is the only large-scale industry in the district and employs about 5,000 people. There are 4 medium-scale industries and 4,748 registered small-scale industries.

The proportion of workers engaged in agriculture in Birbhum has been decreasing. According to the District Human Development Report, “more people are now engaged in non-agricultural activities, such as fishing, retail sales, vegetable vending, selling milk, and so on. As all these activities are at the lower end of the spectrum of marketable skills, it remains doubtful if these activities generate enough return for their family’s sustenance.”

=== Backward Regions Grant Fund ===
Birbhum district is listed as a backward region and receives financial support from the Backward Regions Grant Fund. The fund, created by the Government of India, is designed to redress regional imbalances in development. As of 2012, 272 districts across the country were listed under this scheme. The list includes 11 districts of West Bengal.

== Transport ==
Rajnagar CD block has 4 originating/ terminating bus routes. The nearest railway station is 23 km from the CD block headquarters.

SH 6, running from Rajnagar to Alampur, originates from Rajnagar.

== Culture ==
Rajnagar was an important seat of administration for the Jagirdars, during the period of Muslim rule. There are remains of prosperity of earlier eras. The nahabatkhana of Hindu chieftains, the old imambara, the Fulbagan burial place of Muslim lords, the twelve-domed Motichur mosque, the Kalidaha lake and the walls of a ruined mud fort are all worth a visit.

== Education ==
In 2013-14, Rajnagar CD block had 92 primary schools with 4,829 students, 7 middle schools with 517 students, 4 high schools with 3,096 students and 4 higher secondary schools with 3,388 students. Rajnagar CD Block had 1 general degree college with 407 students, 1 technical/ professional institution with 100 students and 163 institutions for special and non-formal education with 4,358 students.

As per the 2011 census, in Rajnagar CD Block, amongst the 88 inhabited villages, 14 villages did not have a school, 17 villages had more than 1 primary school, 19 villages had at least 1 primary and 1 middle school and 7 villages had at least 1 middle and 1 secondary school. 5 villages had senior secondary schools.

Rajnagar Mahavidyalaya was established at Rajnagar in 2009. Tantipara i t i college near Tantipara hospital more.

== Healthcare ==
In 2014, Rajnagar CD block had 1 rural hospital and 2 primary health centres with total 31 beds and 5 doctors (excluding private bodies). It had 16 family welfare subcentres. 1,533 patients were treated indoor, and 67,518 patients were treated outdoor in the hospitals, health centres and subcentres of the CD block.

As per 2011 census, in Rajnagar CD Block, 1 village had a primary health centre, 8 villages had primary health subcentres, 3 villages had veterinary hospitals, 5 villages had medicine shops and out of the 88 inhabited villages 75 villages had no medical facilities.

Rajnagar Rural Hospital at Rajnagar has 30 beds. There are primary health centres at Bhabanipur (6 beds) and Tantipara (10 beds).
