= Labpur (community development block) =

- Community development block
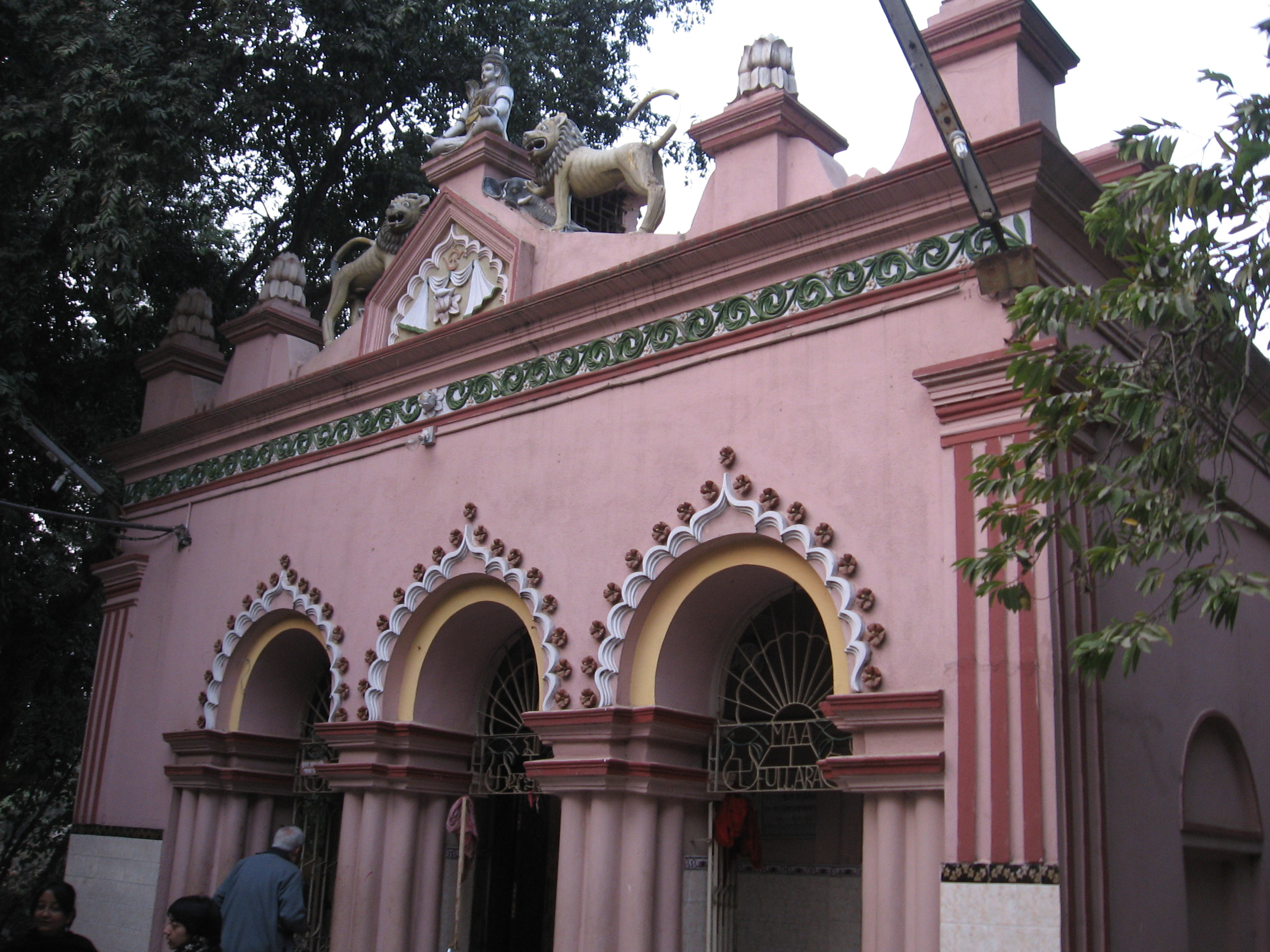
- Fullara temple

- Location in West Bengal
- Coordinates: 23°48′37″N 87°47′44″E
- Country: India
- State: West Bengal
- District: Birbhum
- Parliamentary constituency: Bolpur
- Assembly constituency: Labpur

Area
  - Total: 267.98 km^{2} (103.47 sq mi)

Population (2011)
  - Total: 201,901
  - Density: 753.42/km^{2} (1,951.3/sq mi)
- Time zone: UTC+5.30 (IST)
- Literacy Rate: 71.20 per cent
- Website: http://birbhum.nic.in/

Labpur (also spelled Labhpur) is a community development block that forms an administrative division in Bolpur subdivision district of Birbhum district in the Indian state of West Bengal.

== Overview ==
Birbhum district is physiographically a part of the ancient Rarh region. The western portion of the district is basically an extension of the Chota Nagpur Plateau. The area has mostly loose reddish lateritic low fertility soil. In the east, the flood plains of the major rivers, such as the Ajay, Bakreshwar, Mayurakshi and Brahmani, have soft alluvial soil. The forest cover is only 3.5% of the total district. Although coal is found in the district and Bakreshwar Thermal Power Station has a capacity of 2,010 MW, the economic condition of Birbhum is dominated by agriculture. From 1977 onwards majorland reforms took place in West Bengal. Land in excess of land ceiling was acquired and distributed amongst the peasants. In Birbhum district, 19,968 hectares of vested agricultural land has been distributed amongst 161,515 beneficiaries, till 2011. However, more than 38% of the operational land holding is marginal or less than 1 acre. The proportion of agricultural labourers amongst total workers in Birbhum district is 45.9%, the highest amongst all districts of West Bengal. Culturally rich Birbhum, with such traditional landmarks as Jaydev Kenduli and Chandidas Nanoor, is home to Visva-Bharati University at Santiniketan, having close association with two Nobel laureates – Rabindranath Tagore and Amartya Sen.

== Notable people ==
Tarasankar Bandyopadhyay, the noted author, was born at Labhpur on 23 July 1898.

Abdus Sattar, President of Bangladesh, 1981–82, was born at Daraka in 1906.

Pranab Mukherjee, President of India, 2012–2017, was born on 11 December 1935 and spent his childhood at Mirati.

== Geography ==
Map of Birbhum district showing CD blocks and municipal areas. Click on the map to view larger map.

Labpur is located at 23°48′37″N 87°47′44″E.

Labpur CD Block is part of the Suri-Bolpur Plain, one of the four sub-micro physiographic regions of Birbhum district. It covers the interfluves of the Mayurakshi and Ajay rivers, in the south-eastern part of the district. This area exhibits somewhat upland topography sloping from north-west to south-east.

Labpur CD Block is bounded by Mayureswar II CD Block and Burwan CD Block, in Murshidabad district, on the north, Ketugram I CD Block, in Purba Bardhaman district, on the east, Nanoor CD Block on the south, and Bolpur Sriniketan CD Block on the west.

Labpur CD Block has an area of 267.98 km^{2}. It has 1 panchayat samity, 11 gram panchayats, 113 gram sansads (village councils), 180 mouzas and 161 inhabited villages, as per District Statistical Handbook Birbhum 2008. Labhpur police station serves this block. Headquarters of this CD Block is at Labhpur.

Gram panchayats of Labpur block/panchayat samiti are: Bipratikuri, Chowhatta-Mohodari I, Chowhatta-Mohodari II, Dwarka, Hatia, Indus, Jamna, Kurumnahar, Labpur I, Labpur II and Thiba.

== Demographics ==
=== Population ===
As per the 2011 Census of India, Labpur CD Block had a total population of 201,901, of which 196,482 were rural and 5,419 were urban. There were 103,777 (51%) males and 98,124 (49%) females. Population below 6 years was 23,750. Scheduled Castes numbered 61,649 (30.53%) and Scheduled Tribes numbered 9,507 (4.71%).

As per 2001 census, Labpur block had a total population of 176,803, out of which 90,948 were males and 85,855 were females. Labpur block registered a population growth of 15.15 per cent during the 1991-2001 decade. Decadal growth for Birbhum district was 17.88 per cent. Decadal growth in West Bengal was 17.84 per cent.

Census Town in Labpur CD Block is (2011 census figures in brackets): Labhpur (5,419).

Large villages (with 4,000+ population) in Labpur CD Block are (2011 census figures in brackets): Hatia (5,193), Chauhata (7,969), Kurumba (6,507), Shekhampur (6,561), Madhugram (5,608), Danrka (10,897), Ganutia (4,696) and Kurnahar (4,058).

Other villages in Labpur CD Block include (2011 census figures in brackets): Laghosa (3,980, Jamna (1,446), Thiba (2,776), Bipratikuri (2,060), Indas (3,448), Mahodari (947) and Mirati (1,098).

=== Literacy ===
As per the 2011 census the total number of literates in Labpur CD Block was 126,842 (71.20% of the population over 6 years) out of which males numbered 70,914 (77.32% of the male population over 6 years) and females numbered 55,928 (64.70% of the female population over 6 years). The gender disparity (the difference between female and male literacy rates) was 12.62%.

See also – List of West Bengal districts ranked by literacy rate

Literacy in CD blocks of
Birbhum district
Rampurhat subdivision
Murarai I – 55.67%
Murarai II – 58.28%
Nalhati I – 69.83%
Nalhati II – 71.68%
Rampurhat I – 73.29%
Rampurhat II – 70.77%
Mayureswar I – 71.52%
Mayureswar II – 70.89%
Suri Sadar subdivision
Mohammad Bazar – 65.18%
Rajnagar – 68.10%
Suri I – 72.75%
Suri II – 72.75%
Sainthia – 72.33%
Dubrajpur – 68.26%
Khoyrasol – 68.75%
Bolpur subdivision
Bolpur Sriniketan – 70.67%
Ilambazar – 74.27%
Labpur – 71.20%
Nanoor – 69.45%
2011 Census: CD Block Wise

Primary Census Abstract Data

=== Language and religion ===
Religion in Labpur CD block (2011)
Hinduism	69.24%
Islam	30.54%
Other or not stated	0.22%

In the 2011 census, Hindus numbered 139,793 and formed 69.24% of the population in Labpur CD Block. Muslims numbered 61,655 and formed 30.54% of the population. Christians numbered 208 and formed 0.10% of the population. Others numbered 245 and formed 0.12% of the population.

The proportion of Hindus in Birbhum district has declined from 72.2% in 1961 to 62.3% in 2011. The proportion of Muslims in Birbhum district has increased from 27.6% to 37.1% during the same period. Christians formed 0.3% in 2011.

Languages in Labpur CD block (2011)
1. Bengali (95.9%)
2. Santali (3.68%)
3. Others (0.42%)

At the time of the 2011 census, 95.90% of the population spoke Bengali and 3.68% Santali as their first language.

== Rural poverty ==
As per the BPL household survey carried out in 2005, the proportion of BPL households in Labpur CD Block was 28.3%, against 42.3% in Birbhum district. In six CD Blocks – Murarai II, Nalhati II, Rampurhat II, Rampurhat I, Suri II and Murarai I – the proportion of BPL families was more than 50%. In three CD Blocks – Rajnagar, Suri I and Labpur – the proportion of BPL families was less than 30%. The other ten CD Blocks in Birbhum district were placed in between. According to the District Human Development Report, Birbhum, “Although there is no indication that the share of BPL households is more in blocks with higher share of agricultural labourer, there is a clear pattern that the share of BPL households is more in blocks with disadvantaged population in general and Muslim population in particular.” (The disadvantaged population includes SCs, STs and Muslims.)

== Economy ==
=== Livelihood ===
Livelihood
in Labpur CD Block
1. Cultivators (22.8%)
2. Agricultural labourers (52.7%)
3. Household industries (3.90%)
4. Other Workers (20.6%)

In Labpur CD Block in 2011, amongst the class of total workers, cultivators numbered 16,604 and formed 22.78%, agricultural labourers numbered 38,433 and formed 52.74%, household industry workers numbered 2,840 and formed 3.90% and other workers numbered 14,999 and formed 20.58%. Total workers numbered 72,876 and formed 36.09% of the total population, and non-workers numbered 129,025and formed 63.91% of the population.

Note: In the census records a person is considered a cultivator, if the person is engaged in cultivation/ supervision of land owned by self/government/institution. When a person who works on another person's land for wages in cash or kind or share, is regarded as an agricultural labourer. Household industry is defined as an industry conducted by one or more members of the family within the household or village, and one that does not qualify for registration as a factory under the Factories Act. Other workers are persons engaged in some economic activity other than cultivators, agricultural labourers and household workers. It includes factory, mining, plantation, transport and office workers, those engaged in business and commerce, teacher s, entertainment artistes and so on.

=== Infrastructure ===
There are 160 inhabited villages in Labpur CD Block, as per District Census Handbook, Birbhum, 2011. 100% villages have power supply. 159 villages (99.38%) have drinking water supply. 33 villages (20.62%) have post offices. 152 villages (95.00%) have telephones (including landlines, public call offices and mobile phones). 44 villages (27.50%) have pucca (paved) approach roads and 74 villages (46.25%) have transport communication (includes bus service, rail facility and navigable waterways). 13 villages (8.12%) have agricultural credit societies and 12 villages (7.50%) have banks.

=== Agriculture ===
Following land reforms land ownership pattern has undergone transformation. In 2004-05 (the agricultural labourer data is for 2001), persons engaged in agriculture in Labpur CD Block could be classified as follows: bargadars 8,107 (16.69%), patta (document) holders 8,613 (17.73%), small farmers (possessing land between 1 and 2 hectares) 1,817 (3.74%), marginal farmers (possessing land up to 1 hectare) 5,765 (11.87%) and agricultural labourers 24,282 (48.98%).

Birbhum is a predominantly paddy cultivation-based agricultural district. The area under paddy cultivation in 2010-11 was 249,000 hectares of land. Paddy is grown in do, suna and sali classes of land. There is double to triple cropping system for paddy cultivation. Other crops grown in Birbhum are gram, masuri, peas, wheat, linseed, khesari, til, sugarcane and occasionally cotton. 192,470 hectares of cultivable land is under irrigation by different sources, such as canals, tanks, river lift irrigation and different types of tubewells. In 2009–10, 158,380 hectares were irrigated by canal water. There are such major irrigation projects as Mayurakshi and Hijli. Other rivers such as Ajoy, Brahmani, Kuskurni, Dwaraka, Hingla and Kopai are also helpful for irrigation in the district.

In 2013–14, there were 75 fertiliser depots, 15 seed stores and 47 fair price shops in Labhpur CD block.

In 2013–14, Labhpur CD block produced 66,899 tonnes of Aman paddy, the main winter crop, from 21,089 hectares, 332 tonnes of Aus paddy (summer crop) from 149 hectares, 27,243 tonnes of Boro paddy (spring crop) from 7,802 hectares, 2,472 tonnes of wheat from 1,114 hectares, 11,537 tonnes of potatoes from 759 hectares and 3,537 tonnes of sugar cane from 69 hectares. It also produced pulses and oilseeds.

In 2013–14, the total area irrigated in Labhpur CD block was 20,311 hectares, out of which 12,398 hectares were irrigated by canal water, 1,450 hectares by tank water, 450 hectares by river lift irrigation, 1,820 hectares by deep tube wells and 3,643 hectares by shallow tube wells.

=== Banking ===
In 2013–14, Labhpur CD block had offices of 4 commercial banks and 6 gramin banks.

=== Other sectors ===
According to the District Human Development Report, 2009, Birbhum is one of the most backward districts of West Bengal in terms of industrial development. Of the new industrial projects set-up in West Bengal between 1991 and 2005, only 1.23% came to Birbhum. Bakreshwar Thermal Power Station is the only large-scale industry in the district and employs about 5,000 people. There are 4 medium-scale industries and 4,748 registered small-scale industries.

The proportion of workers engaged in agriculture in Birbhum has been decreasing. According to the District Human Development Report, “more people are now engaged in non-agricultural activities, such as fishing, retail sales, vegetable vending, selling milk, and so on. As all these activities are at the lower end of the spectrum of marketable skills, it remains doubtful if these activities generate enough return for their family’s sustenance.”

=== Backward Regions Grant Fund ===
Birbhum district is listed as a backward region and receives financial support from the Backward Regions Grant Fund. The fund, created by the Government of India, is designed to redress regional imbalances in development. As of 2012, 272 districts across the country were listed under this scheme. The list includes 11 districts of West Bengal.

== Transport ==
Labhpur CD block has 14 originating/ terminating bus routes.

SH 6, running from Rajnagar (in Birbhum district) to Alampur (in Howrah district), passes through Labpur CD Block.

== Culture ==
Fullara, near Labhpur, is one of the Shakta pithas. A 10-day fair is organized near Fullara temple during Magh Purnima.

== Education ==
In 2013–14, Labhpur CD block had 159 primary schools with 12,092 students, 15 middle schools with 747 students, 16 high schools with 9,314 students and 10 higher secondary schools with 13,914 students. Labhpur CD Block had 1 general degree college with 3,286 students, 4 technical/ professional institutions with 197 students and 305 institutions for special and non-formal education with 9,319 students.

As per the 2011 census, in Labpur CD Block, amongst the 160 inhabited villages, 17 villages did not have a school, 40 villages had more than 1 primary school, 40 villages had at least 1 primary and 1 middle school and 26 villages had at least 1 middle and 1 secondary school. 12 villages had senior secondary schools.

Sambhunath College was established at Labhpur in 1963.

== Healthcare ==
In 2014, Labhpur CD block had 1 rural hospital and 5 primary health centres with total 64 beds and 9 doctors (excluding private bodies). It had 31 family welfare subcentres. 6,257 patients were treated indoor and 73,948 patients were treated outdoor in the hospitals, health centres and subcentres of the CD block.

As per 2011 census, in Labpur CD Block, 3 villages had community health centres, 2 villages had primary health centres, 34 villages had primary health subcentres, 6 villages had maternity and child welfare centres, 2 villages had veterinary hospitals, 15 villages had medicine shops and out of the 160 inhabited villages 107 villages had no medical facilities.

Labpur Rural Hospital at Labhpur has 30 beds. There are primary health centres at Bipratikuri (6 beds), Dwaraka (6 beds), Ramkrishnapur (PO Brahamanigram) (6 beds), Thiba (10 beds) and Abhadanga (6 beds).
