= Nalhati II =

- Location in West Bengal
- Coordinates: 24.301111°N 87.936111°E
- Country: India
- State: West Bengal
- District: Birbhum
- Parliamentary constituency: Birbhum
- Assembly constituency: Hansan

Area
  - Total: 109.15 km^{2} (42.14 sq mi)

Population (2011)
  - Total: 127,785
  - Density: 1,170.7/km^{2} (3,032.2/sq mi)
- Time zone: UTC+5.30 (IST)
- PIN: 731237 (Lohapur)
- Telephone/STD code: 03465
- Literacy Rate: 71.68 per cent
- Website: http://birbhum.nic.in/

Nalhati II is a community development block that forms an administrative division in Rampurhat subdivision of Birbhum district in the Indian state of West Bengal.

== Overview ==
Birbhum district is physiographically a part of the ancient Rarh region. The western portion of the district is basically an extension of the Chota Nagpur Plateau. The area has mostly loose reddish lateritic low fertility soil. In the east, the flood plains of the major rivers, such as the Ajay, Bakreshwar, Mayurakshi and Brahmani, have soft alluvial soil. The forest cover is only 3.5% of the total district. Although coal is found in the district and Bakreshwar Thermal Power Station has a capacity of 2,010 MW, the economic condition of Birbhum is dominated by agriculture. From 1977 onwards majorland reforms took place in West Bengal. Land in excess of land ceiling was acquired and distributed amongst the peasants. In Birbhum district, 19,968 hectares of vested agricultural land has been distributed amongst 161,515 beneficiaries, till 2011. However, more than 38% of the operational land holding is marginal or less than 1 acre. The proportion of agricultural labourers amongst total workers in Birbhum district is 45.9%, the highest amongst all districts of West Bengal. Culturally rich Birbhum, with such traditional landmarks as Jaydev Kenduli and Chandidas Nanoor, is home to Visva-Bharati University at Santiniketan, having close association with two Nobel laureates – Rabindranath Tagore and Amartya Sen.

== Geography ==
Map of Birbhum district showing CD blocks and municipal areas. Click on the map to view larger map.

Lohapur is located at 24°18′04″N 87°56′10″E.

Nalhati II Block is mostly part of the Nalhati Plain, one of the four sub-micro physiographic regions occupying the northern portion of Birbhum district.

Nalhati II CD Block is bounded by Murarai II CD Block, and Sagardigihi CD Block, in Murshidabad district, on the north, Sagardighi CD Block, in Murshidabad district, on the east, Rampurhat II CD Block on the south and Nalhati I CD Block, on the west.

Nalhati II CD Block has an area of 109.15 km^{2}. It has 1 panchayat samity, 6 gram panchayats, 49 gram sansads (village councils), 48 mouzas and 48 inhabited villages. Nalhati police station serves this block. Headquarters of this CD Block is at Lohapur.

Gram panchayats of Nalhati II block/panchayat samiti are: Bara I, Bara II, Bhaddarpur I, Bhaddarpur II, Nowapara and Sitalgram.

== Demographics ==
=== Population ===
As per the 2011 Census of India, Nalhati II CD Block had a total population of 127,785, all of which were rural. There were 65,120 (51%) males and 62,665 (49%) females. Population below 6 years was 18,416. Scheduled Castes numbered 27,172 (21.26%) and Scheduled Tribes numbered 522 (0.41%).

As per 2001 census, Nalhati II block had a total population of 106,942, out of which 54,636 were males and 52,306 were females. Nalhati II block registered a population growth of 19.03 per cent during the 1991-2001 decade. Decadal growth for Birbhum district was 17.88 per cent. Decadal growth in West Bengal was 17.84 per cent.

Large villages (with 4,000+ population) in Nalhati II CD Block are (2011 census figures in brackets): Bhadarpur (6,571), Jestha Bhabanipur (15,154), Bara (14,450), Ranha (6,223), Lohapur (4,133), Nabagram (4,032), Ujirpur (4,115), Biralchauki (4,783), Nawapara (4,436) and Bandkhola (5,042).

Other villages in Nalhati II CD Block include (2011 census figures in brackets): Shitalgram (3,403).

=== Literacy ===
As per the 2011 census the total number of literates in Nalhati II CD Block was 78,390 (71.68% of the population over 6 years) out of which males numbered 42,792 (76.84% of the male population over 6 years) and females numbered 35,598 (66.32% of the female population over 6 years). The gender disparity (the difference between female and male literacy rates) was 10.52%.

See also – List of West Bengal districts ranked by literacy rate

Literacy in CD blocks of
Birbhum district
Rampurhat subdivision
Murarai I – 55.67%
Murarai II – 58.28%
Nalhati I – 69.83%
Nalhati II – 71.68%
Rampurhat I – 73.29%
Rampurhat II – 70.77%
Mayureswar I – 71.52%
Mayureswar II – 70.89%
Suri Sadar subdivision
Mohammad Bazar – 65.18%
Rajnagar – 68.10%
Suri I – 72.75%
Suri II – 72.75%
Sainthia – 72.33%
Dubrajpur – 68.26%
Khoyrasol – 68.75%
Bolpur subdivision
Bolpur Sriniketan – 70.67%
Ilambazar – 74.27%
Labpur – 71.20%
Nanoor – 69.45%
2011 Census: CD Block Wise

Primary Census Abstract Data

=== Language and religion ===
Religion in Nalhati II CD block (2011)
Islam	70.10%
Hinduism	29.79%
Other or not stated	0.11%

In the 2011 census, Muslims numbered 89,578 and formed 70.10% of the population in Nalhati II CD Block. Hindus numbered 38,061 and formed 29.79% of the population. Christians numbered 61 and formed 0.05% of the population. Others numbered 85 and formed 0.07% of the population.

The proportion of Hindus in Birbhum district has declined from 72.2% in 1961 to 62.3% in 2011. The proportion of Muslims in Birbhum district has increased from 27.6% to 37.1% during the same period. Christians formed 0.3% in 2011.

Bengali is the predominant language, spoken by 99.74% of the population.

== Rural poverty ==
As per the BPL household survey carried out in 2005, the proportion of BPL households in Nalhati II CD Block was 56.3%, against 42.3% in Birbhum district. In six CD Blocks – Murarai II, Nalhati II, Rampurhat II, Rampurhat I, Suri II and Murarai I – the proportion of BPL families was more than 50%. In three CD Blocks – Rajnagar, Suri I and Labhpur – the proportion of BPL families was less than 30%. The other ten CD Blocks in Birbhum district were placed in between. According to the District Human Development Report, Birbhum, “Although there is no indication that the share of BPL households is more in blocks with higher share of agricultural labourer, there is a clear pattern that the share of BPL households is more in blocks with disadvantaged population in general and Muslim population in particular.” (The disadvantaged population includes SCs, STs and Muslims.)

== Economy ==
=== Livelihood ===
Livelihood
in Nalhati II CD Block
1. Cultivators (16.5%)
2. Agricultural labourers (57.0%)
3. Household industries (7.56%)
4. Other Workers (18.9%)

In Nalhati II CD Block in 2011, amongst the class of total workers, cultivators numbered 7,556 and formed 16.53%, agricultural labourers numbered 26,040 and formed 56.97%, household industry workers numbered 3,456 and formed 7.56% and other workers numbered 8,655 and formed 18.94%. Total workers numbered 45,707 and formed 35.77% of the total population, and non-workers numbered 82,078 and formed 64.23% of the population.

Note: In the census records a person is considered a cultivator, if the person is engaged in cultivation/ supervision of land owned by self/government/institution. When a person who works on another person’s land for wages in cash or kind or share, is regarded as an agricultural labourer. Household industry is defined as an industry conducted by one or more members of the family within the household or village, and one that does not qualify for registration as a factory under the Factories Act. Other workers are persons engaged in some economic activity other than cultivators, agricultural labourers and household workers. It includes factory, mining, plantation, transport and office workers, those engaged in business and commerce, teachers, entertainment artistes and so on.

=== Infrastructure ===
There are 48 inhabited villages in Nalhati II CD Block, as per District Census Handbook, Birbhum, 2011. 100% villages have power supply. 47 villages (97.92%) have drinking water supply. 7 villages (14.58%) have post offices. 46 villages (95.83%) have telephones (including landlines, public call offices and mobile phones). 18 villages (37.80%) have a pucca (paved) approach road and 24 villages (50.00%) have transport communication (includes bus service, rail facility and navigable waterways). 6 villages (12.50%) have agricultural credit societies and 6 villages (12.50%) have banks.

=== Agriculture ===
Following land reforms land ownership pattern has undergone transformation. In 2004-05 (the agricultural labourer data is for 2001), persons engaged in agriculture in Nalhati II CD Block could be classified as follows: bargadars 1,998 (7.16%), patta (document) holders 4,125 (14.77%), small farmers (possessing land between 1 and 2 hectares) 3,010 (10.78%), marginal farmers (possessing land up to 1 hectare) 4,215 (15.10%) and agricultural labourers 14,573 (52.19%).

Birbhum is a predominantly paddy cultivation-based agricultural district. The area under paddy cultivation in 2010-11 was 249,000 hectares of land. Paddy is grown in do, suna and sali classes of land. There is double to triple cropping system for paddy cultivation. Other crops grown in Birbhum are gram, masuri, peas, wheat, linseed, khesari, til, sugarcane and occasionally cotton. 192,470 hectares of cultivable land is under irrigation by different sources, such as canals, tanks, river lift irrigation and different types of tubewells. In 2009-10, 158,380 hectares were irrigated by canal water. There are such major irrigation projects as Mayurakshi and Hijli. Other rivers such as Ajoy, Brahmani, Kuskurni, Dwaraka, Hingla and Kopai are also helpful for irrigation in the district.

In 2013-14, there were 74 fertiliser depots, 5 seed stores and 33 fair price shops in Nalhati II CD block.

In 2013-14, Nalhati II CD block produced 4,097 tonnes of Aman paddy, the main winter crop, from 1,536 hectares, 18,307 tonnes of Boro paddy (spring crop) from 5,164 hectares, 6,856 tonnes of wheat from 2,245 hectares and 19,265 tonnes of potatoes from 697 hectares. It also produced pulses and oilseeds.

In 2013-14, the total area irrigated in Nalhati II CD block was 14,970 hectares, out of which 8,200 hectares were irrigated by canal water, 810 hectares by tank water, 5,300 hectares by deep tube wells, 100 hectares by shallow tube wells and 560 hectares by other means.

=== Banking ===
In 2013-14, Nalhati II CD block had offices of 4 commercial banks and 4 gramin banks.

=== Other sectors ===
According to the District Human Development Report, 2009, Birbhum is one of the most backward districts of West Bengal in terms of industrial development. Of the new industrial projects set-up in West Bengal between 1991 and 2005, only 1.23% came to Birbhum. Bakreshwar Thermal Power Station is the only large-scale industry in the district and employs about 5,000 people. There are 4 medium-scale industries and 4,748 registered small-scale industries.

The proportion of workers engaged in agriculture in Birbhum has been decreasing. According to the District Human Development Report, “more people are now engaged in non-agricultural activities, such as fishing, retail sales, vegetable vending, selling milk, and so on. As all these activities are at the lower end of the spectrum of marketable skills, it remains doubtful if these activities generate enough return for their family’s sustenance.”

=== Backward Regions Grant Fund ===
Birbhum district is listed as a backward region and receives financial support from the Backward Regions Grant Fund. The fund, created by the Government of India, is designed to redress regional imbalances in development. As of 2012, 272 districts across the country were listed under this scheme. The list includes 11 districts of West Bengal.

== Transport ==
Nalhati II CD block has 4 originating/ terminating bus routes.

Nalhati-Azimganj branch line passes through this block. There also is a station at Lohapur.

SH 7, running from Rajgram to Midnapore, and NH 14, running from Morgram to Kharagpur, passes through this block. They have a common route in the Nalhati II block.

== Education ==
In 2013-14, Nalhati II CD block had 67 primary schools with 7,941 students, 9 middle schools with 1.940 students, 8 high schools with 10,275 students and 5 higher secondary schools with 7,457 students. Nalhati II CD Block had 5 technical/ professional institutions with 456 students and 202 institutions for special and non-formal education with 9,913 students

As per the 2011 census, in Nalhati II CD Block, amongst the 48 inhabited villages, 1 village did not have a school, 23 villages had more than 1 primary school, 17 villages had at least 1 primary and 1 middle school and 12 villages had at least 1 middle and 1 secondary school. 6 villages had senior secondary schools.

== Healthcare ==
In 2014, Nalhati II CD Block had 1 block primary health centre and 2 primary health centres with total 31 beds and 4 doctors (excluding private bodies). It had 18 family welfare subcentres. 3,634 patients were treated indoor and 69,829 patients were treated outdoor in the hospitals, health centres and subcentres of the CD block.

As per 2011 census, in Nalhati II CD Block, 1 village had a primary health centre, 23 villages had primary health subcentres, 3 villages had maternity and child welfare centres, 4 villages had veterinary hospitals, 6 villages had medicine shops and out of the 48 inhabited villages 17 villages had no medical facilities.

Lohapur Block Primary Health Centre at Lohapur has 15 beds. There are primary health centres at Sitalgram (6 beds) and Bhadrapur (10 beds).
