= Paikar =

- Village
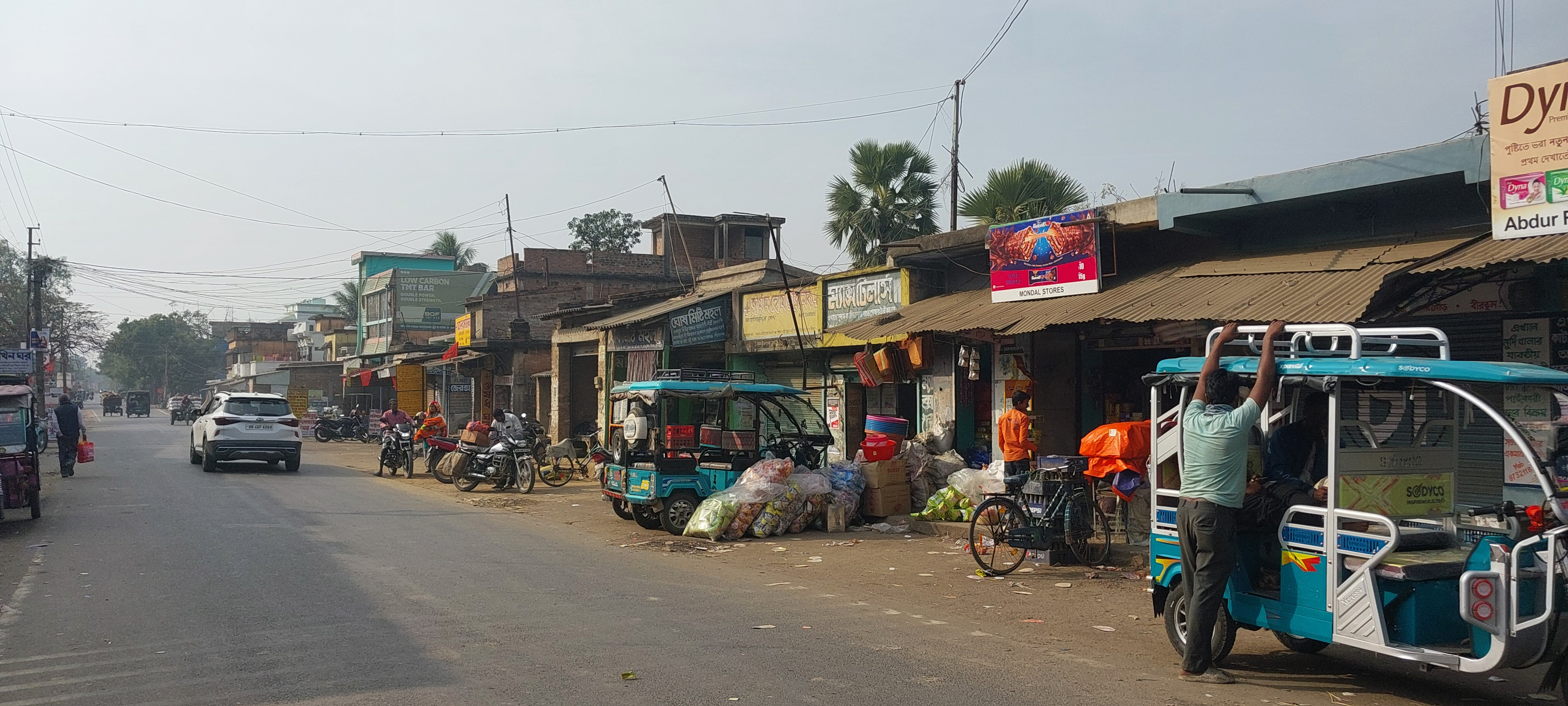

- Location in West Bengal, India
- Coordinates: 24.438833°N 87.911167°E
- Country: India
- State: West Bengal
- District: Birbhum

Population (2011)
  - Total: 12,250

Languages
  - Official: Bengali, English
- Time zone: UTC+5:30 (IST)
- PIN: 731221 (Paikar)
- Telephone/STD code: 03465
- Lok Sabha constituency: Birbhum
- Vidhan Sabha constituency: Murarai
- Website: birbhum.nic.in

Paikar is a village in the Murarai II community development block in the Rampurhat subdivision of Birbhum district in the Indian state of West Bengal.

== Geography ==
Cities and towns in Rampurhat subdivision of Birbhum district
M: municipal city/ town, CT: census town, R: rural/ urban centre.
Owing to space constraints in the small map, the actual locations in a larger map may vary slightly

=== Location ===
The Bansloi flows past Paikar. The Pagla River is in the western side of the village.

=== Police station ===
There is a police station at Paikar in Birbhum.

=== Community development block headquarters ===
The headquarters of the Murarai II community development block are located at Paikar.

=== Overview ===
The northern portion of Rampurhat subdivision (shown in the map alongside) is part of the Nalhati Plains, a sub-micro physiographic region, and the southern portion is part of the Brahmani-Mayurakshi Basin, another sub-micro physiographic region occupying the area between the Brahmani in the north and the Mayurakshi in the south. There is an occasional intrusion of Rajmahal Hills, from adjoining Santhal Parganas, towards the north-western part of the subdivision. On the western side is Santhal Parganas and the border between West Bengal and Jharkhand can be seen in the map. Murshidabad district is on the eastern side. A small portion of the Padma River and the border with Bangladesh (thick line) can be seen in the north-eastern corner of the map. 96.62% of the population of Rampurhat subdivision live the rural areas and 3.38% of the population live in the urban areas.

Note: The map alongside presents some of the notable locations in the area. All places marked in the map are linked in the larger full screen map.

== Demographics ==
As per the 2011 Census of India, Paikar had a total population of 12,250 of which 6,134 (50%) were males and 6,116 (50%) were females. Population below 6 years was 1,732. The total number of literates in Paikar was 6,429 (61.12% of the population over 6 years).

== Transport ==
Paikar is on Bhadiswar Road.

== Post office ==
Paikar has a delivery sub post office, with PIN 731221, under Rampurhat head office. Branch offices with the same PIN are situated at Bangsabati, Bonha, Dantura, Gaganpur, Harowa, Hilora, Jajigram, Kasimnagar, Mitrapur, Panchahar, Raturi and Tirogram.

== Culture ==
Paikar Satyendra Public cum Government sponsored Town Library was established in 1916. It has its own pucca building.

== Healthcare ==
Paikar Rural Hospital at Paikar has 30 beds.
