= Haridaspur, Birbhum =

Haridaspur
- Village
- Location in West Bengal, India Haridaspur (India)
- Coordinates: 24.25356°N 87.74397°E
- Country: India
- State: West Bengal
- District: Birbhum
- Subdivision: Rampurhat
- CD Block: Nalhati I

Government
  - Body: Gram panchayat

Population (2011)
  - Total: 2,856

Languages
  - Official: Bengali, English
- Time zone: UTC+5:30 (IST)
- ISO 3166 code: IN-WB
- Vehicle registration: WB
- Website: wb.gov.in

Haridaspur is a village and gram panchayat in Nalhati I CD Block, in Rampurhat subdivision of Birbhum district, West Bengal, India.

== Geography ==
=== Location ===
Brahmani River and Baidhara Barrage are located nearby.

Nalhati, the CD Block headquarters, is 8 km away from Haridaspur and Rampurhat, the nearest town, is 18 km away.

== Gram panchayat ==
Villages in Haridaspur gram panchayat are: Bhabanandapur, Bhagabatipur, Gunua, Haridaspur, Jungul, Kartickdanga, Lakshminarayanpur, Madhabpur, Santoshpur and Shingdohari.

== Demographics ==
As per the 2011 Census of India, Haridaspur had a total population of 2,856 of which 1,469 (51%) were males and 1,387 (49%) were females. Population below 6 years was 357. The total number of literates in Haridaspur was 1,746 (69.87% of the population over 6 years).
