= Lokpara =

- Village
- Location in West Bengal, India Lokpara (India)
- Coordinates: 23.938256°N 87.834944°E
- Country: India
- State: West Bengal
- District: Birbhum

Population (2011)
  - Total: 676

Languages
  - Official: Bengali, English
- Time zone: UTC+5:30 (IST)
- Telephone code: 03462
- Lok Sabha constituency: Bolpur
- Vidhan Sabha constituency: Mayureswar
- Website: birbhum.nic.in

Lokpara is a village in Mayureswar II CD block in Rampurhat subdivision of Birbhum district.

== Geography ==
Cities and towns in Rampurhat subdivision of Birbhum district
M: municipal city/ town, CT: census town, R: rural/ urban centre.
Owing to space constraints in the small map, the actual locations in a larger map may vary slightly

=== Location ===
Lokpara is located at 23.938256°N 87.834944°E.

=== Overview ===
The northern portion of Rampurhat subdivision (shown in the map alongside) is part of the Nalhati Plains, a sub-micro physiographic region, and the southern portion is part of the Brahmani-Mayurakshi Basin, another sub-micro physiographic region occupying the area between the Brahmani in the north and the Mayurakshi in the south. There is an occasional intrusion of Rajmahal Hills, from adjoining Santhal Parganas, towards the north-western part of the subdivision. On the western side is Santhal Parganas and the border between West Bengal and Jharkhand can be seen in the map. Murshidabad district is on the eastern side. A small portion of the Padma River and the border with Bangladesh (thick line) can be seen in the north-eastern corner of the map. 96.62% of the population of Rampurhat subdivision live the rural areas and 3.38% of the population live in the urban areas.

Note: The map alongside presents some of the notable locations in the area. All places marked in the map are linked in the larger full screen map.

== Demographics ==
As per the 2011 Census of India, Lokpara had a total population of 676 of which 358 (53%) were males and 318 (47%) were females. Population below 6 years was 86. The total number of literates in Lokpara was 375 (63.56% of the population over 6 years).

== Transport ==
A short stretch of Dhaka-Lokpara Road connects Lokpara to State Highway 11, running from Mohammad Bazar to Ranaghat.

== Education ==
Lokepara Mahavidyalaya was established at Lokpara, PO Kuliara, in 2010. Affiliated with the University of Burdwan, it offers honours courses in Bengali, Sanskrit, history and philosophy, and general courses in arts and science.
