= Mayureswar I =

- Community development block
- Location in West Bengal
- Coordinates: 24°00′50″N 87°41′31″E
- Country: India
- State: West Bengal
- District: Birbhum
- Parliamentary constituency: Bolpur
- Assembly constituency: Mayureswar

Area
  - Total: 224.83 km^{2} (86.81 sq mi)

Population (2011)
  - Total: 159,782
  - Density: 710.68/km^{2} (1,840.7/sq mi)
- Time zone: UTC+5.30 (IST)
- PIN: 731216
- Literacy Rate: 71.52 per cent
- Website: http://birbhum.nic.in/

Mayureswar I is a community development block that forms an administrative division in Rampurhat subdivision of Birbhum district in the Indian state of West Bengal.

== Overview ==
Birbhum district is physiographically a part of the ancient Rarh region. The western portion of the district is basically an extension of the Chota Nagpur Plateau. The area has mostly loose reddish lateritic low fertility soil. In the east, the flood plains of the major rivers, such as the Ajay, Bakreshwar, Mayurakshi and Brahmani have soft alluvial soil. The forest cover is only 3.5% of the total district. Although coal is found in the district and Bakreshwar Thermal Power Station has a capacity of 2,010 MW, the economic condition of Birbhum is dominated by agriculture. From 1977 onwards major land reforms took place in West Bengal. Land in excess of land ceiling was acquired and distributed amongst the peasants. In Birbhum district, 19,968 hectares of vested agricultural land has been distributed amongst 161,515 beneficiaries, till 2011. However, more than 38% of the operational land holding is marginal or less than 1 acre. The proportion of agricultural labourers amongst total workers in Birbhum district is 45.9%, the highest amongst all districts of West Bengal. Culturally rich Birbhum, with such traditional landmarks as Jaydev Kenduli and Chandidas Nanoor, is home to Visva-Bharati University at Santiniketan, having close association with two Nobel laureates – Rabindranath Tagore and Amartya Sen.

== Geography ==
Map of Birbhum district showing CD blocks and municipal areas. Click on the map to view larger map.

Mallarpur is located at 24°00′50″N 87°41′31″E.

Mayureshwar I CD Block is part of the Brahmani-Mayurakshi Basin, one of the four sub-micro physiographic regions occupying the area between Brahmani River in the north and Mayurakshi River in the south.

Mayureshwar I CD Block is bounded by Rampurhat I and Rampurhat II CD Blocks on the north, Burwan CD Block, in Murshidabad district, on the east, Mayureswar II and Sainthia CD Block on the south and Mohammad Bazar CD Block on the west.

Mayureswar I CD Block has an area of 224.83 km^{2}. It has 1 panchayat samity, 9 gram panchayats, 88 gram sansads (village councils), 114 mouzas and 108 inhabited villages, according to District Statistical Handbook Birbhum 2008. Mallarpur police station serves this block. Headquarters of this CD Block is at Mallarpur.

Gram panchayats of Mayureswar I block/panchayat samiti are: Bajitpur, Baraturigram, Dabuk, Dakshingram, Jhikadda, Kanachi, Mollarpur I, Mollarpur II and Talwan.

== Demographics ==
=== Population ===
As per the 2011 Census of India, Mayureshwar I CD Block had a total population of 159,782, of which 149,606 were rural and 10,176 were urban. There were 81,465 (51%) males and 78,317 (49%) females. Population below 6 years was 19,966. Scheduled Castes numbered 54,435 (34.07%) and Scheduled Tribes numbered 10,692 (6.69%).

As per 2001 census, Mayureswar I block had a total population of 139,677, out of which 71,677 were males and 68,000 were females. Mayureswar I block registered a population growth of 19.80 per cent during the 1991-2001 decade. Decadal growth for Birbhum district was 17.88 per cent. Decadal growth in West Bengal was 17.84 per cent.

Census Town in Mayureshwar I CD Block is (2011 census figure in brackets): Fatehpur (10,176).

Large villages (with 4,000+ population) in Mayursehwar I CD Block are (2011 census figures in brackets): Sekhpur (4,638), Mallarpur (6,471), Rangtara (4,120), Baraturigram (5,968), Hazipur (4,345) and Sanakpur (5,050).

Other villages in Mayureshwar I CD Block include (2011 census figures in brackets): Dabuk (3,096), Jhikadda (1,088), Bajitpur (2,611), Kanachi (2,108), Dakshin Gram (2,589) and Taloan (2,409).

=== Literacy ===
As per the 2011 census the total number of literates in Mayureswar I CD Block was 99,993 (71.52% of the population over 6 years) out of which males numbered 56,064 (78.59% of the male population over 6 years) and females numbered 43,929 (64.15% of the female population over 6 years). The gender disparity (the difference between female and male literacy rates) was 14.44%.

See also – List of West Bengal districts ranked by literacy rate

Literacy in CD blocks of
Birbhum district
Rampurhat subdivision
Murarai I – 55.67%
Murarai II – 58.28%
Nalhati I – 69.83%
Nalhati II – 71.68%
Rampurhat I – 73.29%
Rampurhat II – 70.77%
Mayureswar I – 71.52%
Mayureswar II – 70.89%
Suri Sadar subdivision
Mohammad Bazar – 65.18%
Rajnagar – 68.10%
Suri I – 72.75%
Suri II – 72.75%
Sainthia – 72.33%
Dubrajpur – 68.26%
Khoyrasol – 68.75%
Bolpur subdivision
Bolpur Sriniketan – 70.67%
Ilambazar – 74.27%
Labpur – 71.20%
Nanoor – 69.45%
2011 Census: CD Block Wise

Primary Census Abstract Data

=== Language and religion ===
Religion in Mayureswar I CD block (2011)
Hinduism	69.84%
Islam	29.39%
Other or not stated	0.77%

In the 2011 census, Hindus numbered 111,589 and formed 69.84% of the population in Mayureswar I CD Block. Muslims numbered 46,864 and formed 29.39% of the population. Christians numbered 446 and formed 0.28% of the population. Others numbered 883 and formed 0.55% of the population.

The proportion of Hindus in Birbhum district has declined from 72.2% in 1961 to 62.3% in 2011. The proportion of Muslims in Birbhum district has increased from 27.6% to 37.1% during the same period. Christians formed 0.3% in 2011.

Languages in Mayureswar I CD block (2011)
1. Bengali 93.45 (92.5%)
2. Santali 5.62 (5.56%)
3. Others 1.93 (1.91%)

At the time of the 2011 census, 93.45% of the population spoke Bengali and 5.62% Santali as their first language.

== Rural poverty ==
As per the BPL household survey carried out in 2005, the proportion of BPL households in Mayureswar I CD Block was 39.8%, against 42.3% in Birbhum district. In six CD Blocks – Murarai II, Nalhati II, Rampurhat II, Rampurhat I, Suri II and Murarai I – the proportion of BPL families was more than 50%. In three CD Blocks – Rajnagar, Suri I and Labhpur – the proportion of BPL families was less than 30%. The other ten CD Blocks in Birbhum district were placed in between. According to the District Human Development Report, Birbhum, “Although there is no indication that the share of BPL households is more in blocks with higher share of agricultural labourer, there is a clear pattern that the share of BPL households is more in blocks with disadvantaged population in general and Muslim population in particular.” (The disadvantaged population includes SCs, STs and Muslims.)

== Economy ==
=== Livelihood ===
Livelihood
in Mayureswar I CD Block
1. Cultivators (20.3%)
2. Agricultural labourers (52.3%)
3. Household industries (4.93%)
4. Other Workers (22.5%)

In Mayureswar I CD Block in 2011, amongst the class of total workers, cultivators numbered 12,973 and formed 20.30%, agricultural labourers numbered 33,407 and formed 52.27%, household industry workers numbered 3,152 and formed 4.93% and other workers numbered 14,378 and formed 22.50%. Total workers numbered 63,910 and formed 40.00% of the total population, and non-workers numbered 95,872 and formed 60.00% of the population.

Note: In the census records a person is considered a cultivator, if the person is engaged in cultivation/ supervision of land owned by self/government/institution. When a person who works on another person’s land for wages in cash or kind or share, is regarded as an agricultural labourer. Household industry is defined as an industry conducted by one or more members of the family within the household or village, and one that does not qualify for registration as a factory under the Factories Act. Other workers are persons engaged in some economic activity other than cultivators, agricultural labourers and household workers. It includes factory, mining, plantation, transport and office workers, those engaged in business and commerce, teachers, entertainment artistes and so on.

=== Infrastructure ===
There are 107 inhabited villages in Mayureswar I CD Block, as per District Census Handbook, Birbhum, 2011. 100% villages have power supply. 106 villages (99.07%) have drinking water supply. 20 villages (18.69%) have post offices. 100 villages (93.46%) have telephones (including landlines, public call offices and mobile phones). 23 villages (21.50%) have a pucca (paved) approach road and 38 villages (35.51%) have transport communication (includes bus service, rail facility and navigable waterways). 12 villages (11.21%) have agricultural credit societies and 6 villages (5.61%) have banks.

=== Agriculture ===
Following land reforms land ownership pattern has undergone transformation. In 2004-05 (the agricultural labourer data is for 2001), persons engaged in agriculture in Mayureswar I CD Block could be classified as follows: bargadars 3,276 (5.79%), patta (document) holders 7,990 (14.13%), small farmers (possessing land between 1 and 2 hectares) 9,986 (17.66%), marginal farmers (possessing land up to 1 hectare) 11,695 (20.68%) and agricultural labourers 23,599 (41.73%).

Birbhum is a predominantly paddy cultivation-based agricultural district. The area under paddy cultivation in 2010-11 was 249,000 hectares of land. Paddy is grown in do, suna and sali classes of land. There is double to triple cropping system for paddy cultivation. Other crops grown in Birbhum are gram, masuri, peas, wheat, linseed, khesari, til, sugarcane and occasionally cotton. 192,470 hectares of cultivable land is under irrigation by different sources, such as canals, tanks, river lift irrigation and different types of tubewells. In 2009-10, 158,380 hectares were irrigated by canal water. There are such major irrigation projects as Mayurakshi and Hijli. Other rivers such as Ajoy, Brahmani, Kuskurni, Dwaraka, Hingla and Kopai are also helpful for irrigation in the district.

In 2013-14, there were 60 fertiliser depots, 12 seed stores and 57 fair price shops in Mayureswar I CD block.

In 2013-14, Mayureswar I CD block produced 50,817 tonnes of Aman paddy, the main winter crop, from 16,670 hectares, 9,936 tonnes of Boro paddy (spring crop) from 3,016 hectares, 4,856 tonnes of wheat from 1,418 hectares, 274 tonnes of jute from 14 hectares, 14,159 tonnes of potatoes from 739 hectares and 3,566 tonnes of sugar cane from 46 hectares. It also produced pulses and oilseeds.

In 2013-14, the total area irrigated in Mayureswar I CD block was 21,692 hectares, out of which 15,000 hectares were irrigated by canal water, 552 hectares by tank water, 50 hectares by river lift irrigation, 3,040 hectares by deep tube wells and 3,050 hectares by other means.

=== Banking ===
In 2013-14, Mayureswar I CD block had offices of 6 commercial banks and 3 gramin banks.

=== Other sectors ===
According to the District Human Development Report, 2009, Birbhum is one of the most backward districts of West Bengal in terms of industrial development. Of the new industrial projects set-up in West Bengal between 1991 and 2005, only 1.23% came to Birbhum. Bakreshwar Thermal Power Station is the only large-scale industry in the district and employs about 5,000 people. There are 4 medium-scale industries and 4,748 registered small-scale industries.

The proportion of workers engaged in agriculture in Birbhum has been decreasing. According to the District Human Development Report, “more people are now engaged in non-agricultural activities, such as fishing, retail sales, vegetable vending, selling milk, and so on. As all these activities are at the lower end of the spectrum of marketable skills, it remains doubtful if these activities generate enough return for their family’s sustenance.”

=== Backward Regions Grant Fund ===
Birbhum district is listed as a backward region and receives financial support from the Backward Regions Grant Fund. The fund, created by the Government of India, is designed to redress regional imbalances in development. As of 2012, 272 districts across the country were listed under this scheme. The list includes 11 districts of West Bengal.

== Transport ==
Mayureswar I CD block has 8 originating/ terminating bus routes.

The Khana-Barharwa section of Sahibganj loop passes through this block. There are stations at Mallarpur and Gadadharpur.

NH 14 and NH 114 pass through this block.

== Culture ==
Dabukeswar temple at Dabuk is the highest temple in Birbhum district. It was constructed in 1287 Bengali era.

Poush Sankranti fair is held at Shibpur in the Mayureswar police station. Shivratri fair is held at Dabuk. Gosaidas fair is held at Dakshingram. Dharma pujo fair is held at Ratma on the occasion of Buddha Purnima.

== Education ==
In 2013-14, Mayureswar I CD block had 112 primary schools with 10,625 students, 8 middle schools with 952 students, 14 high schools with 8,055 students and 8 higher secondary schools with 8,745 students. Mayureswar I CD Block had 1 general degree college with 2,432 students, 3 technical/ professional institutions with 449 students and 258 institutions for special and non-formal education with 8,065 students

As per the 2011 census, in Mayursewar I CD Block, amongst the 107 inhabited villages, 6 villages did not have a school, 34 villages had more than 1 primary school, 35 villages had at least 1 primary and 1 middle school and 26 villages had at least 1 middle and 1 secondary school. 13 villages had senior secondary schools. There were 2 degree colleges for arts, science and commerce in Mayureswar I CD Block.

Turku Hansda-Lapsa Hemram Mahavidyalaya was established at Madian in 2006.

== Healthcare ==
In 2014, Muyureswar I CD block had 1 rural hospital and 2 primary health centres with total 31 beds and 4 doctors (excluding private bodies). It had 23 family welfare subcentres. 4,004 patients were treated indoor and 84,606 patients were treated outdoor in the hospitals, health centres and subcentres of the CD block.

As per 2011 census, in Mayureswar I CD Block, 1 village had a community health centre, 3 villages had primary health centres, 78 villages had primary health subcentres, 4 villages had maternity and child welfare centres, 4 villages had veterinary hospitals, 15 villages had medicine shops and out of the 107 inhabited villages 20 villages had no medical facilities.

Mallarpur Rural Hospital at Mallarpur has 30 beds. There are primary health centres at Talwa (6 beds) and Ratma (PO Daksingram) (6 beds).
