= Jogdhari =

Jogdhari Jagadhari jagdhari
- Village
- Location in West Bengal, India Jogdhari (India)
- Coordinates: 24.2815675°N 87.8369701°E
- Country: India
- State: West Bengal
- District: Birbhum district
- Elevation: 40 m (130 ft)

Languages
  - Official: Bengali, English
- Time zone: UTC+5:30 (IST)
- ISO 3166 code: IN-WB

Jogdhari is a small village in the Birbhum district of West Bengal, India. It is on the banks of River Brahmani. It comes under the municipal authority of Nalhati. It is close to the West Bengal-Jharkhand border.
