= Kotasur =

- census town
- Location in West Bengal, India
- Coordinates: 23.96078°N 87.744734°E
- Country: India
- State: West Bengal
- District: Birbhum

Population (2011)
  - Total: 4,302

Languages
  - Official: Bengali, English
- Time zone: UTC+5:30 (IST)
- PIN: 731213 (Kotasur)
- Telephone code: 03462
- Lok Sabha constituency: Bolpur
- Vidhan Sabha constituency: Mayureswar
- Website: birbhum.nic.in

Kotasur (also spelled as Katasur) is a census town in Mayureswar II CD Block in Rampurhat subdivision of Birbhum district in the Indian state of West Bengal. It is situated in the bank of river Mayurakshi..

== History ==
It is common to listen that there was a time when Kotasur was inhabited by Raja and Asur during Mahabharat's time and it was the capital of the kingdom Kouteshwar. The present name of Kotasur came from that ancient name Kouteswar.

== Geography ==
Cities and towns in Rampurhat subdivision of Birbhum district
M: municipal city/ town, CT: census town, R: rural/ urban centre.
Owing to space constraints in the small map, the actual locations in a larger map may vary slightly

=== CD block HQ ===
The headquarters of Mayureswar II CD block are located at Kotasur.

=== Panchayet ===
Kundala Gram Panchayet

=== Overview ===
The northern portion of Rampurhat subdivision (shown in the map alongside) is part of the Nalhati Plains, a sub-micro physiographic region, and the southern portion is part of the Brahmani-Mayurakshi Basin, another sub-micro physiographic region occupying the area between the Brahmani in the north and the Mayurakshi in the south. There is an occasional intrusion of Rajmahal Hills, from adjoining Santhal Parganas, towards the north-western part of the subdivision. On the western side is Santhal Parganas and the border between West Bengal and Jharkhand can be seen in the map. Murshidabad district is on the eastern side. A small portion of the Padma River and the border with Bangladesh (thick line) can be seen in the north-eastern corner of the map. 96.62% of the population of Rampurhat subdivision live the rural areas and 3.38% of the population live in the urban areas.

Note: The map alongside presents some of the notable locations in the area. All places marked in the map are linked in the larger full screen map.

== Demographics ==
As per the 2011 Census of India, Katasur had a total population of 4,302 of which 2,196 (51%) were males and 2,106 (49%) were females. Population below 6 years was 486. The total number of literates in Katasur was 2,867 (75.13% of the population over 6 years).

== Transport ==
SH 11, running from Mohammad Bazar to Ranaghat, passes through Kotasur. Nearby Railway station Sainthia Junction is about 7.9 km away from Kotasur.

== Education ==
Kotasur has a government-aided higher-secondary co-educational school (Kotasur High School), as well as government primary schools and private primary schools. Students from the neighbouring villages are often seen admitted to the Kotasur High school.

== Post office ==
Kotasur has a delivery branch post office, with PIN 731213, under Mayureswar sub office and Suri head office.

== Nearby Places ==
=== Madaneswar Temple ===
Kotasur is mainly famous for the renowned Madaneswar temple situated in the heart of the village. The main festival of this temple are "Shibratri", "Jaldhala", "Charak" etc. +

=== Aam Bagan ===
It is one of the favourite picnic spots of nearby people of kotasur located in the bank of river Mayurakshi.

== Healthcare ==
Kotasur has a Primary Health Centre(Hatinagar PHC), Sub centre(Kotasur SC), veterinary hospital and other public health care centres. Nearest hospital Sainthia State General Hospital is 8 Kilometers away from Kotasur. Nearest main hospital is Suri Sadar Hospital. Nearest Medical College and Hospital is Rampurhat Government Medical College and Hospital.
