= Rampurhat subdivision =

Rampurhat Subdivision
- Subdivision
- Interactive map of Rampurhat Subdivision
- Coordinates: 24.17°N 87.78°E
- Country: India
- State: West Bengal
- District: Birbhum
- Headquarters: Rampurhat

Languages
  - Official: Bengali, English
- Time zone: UTC+5:30 (IST)
- ISO 3166 code: ISO 3166-2:IN
- Vehicle registration: WB 46
- Website: wb.gov.in

Rampurhat subdivision is an administrative subdivision of Birbhum district in the state of West Bengal, India.It is the most populous subdivision in the district. Rampurhat subdivision lies in the northern part of Birbhum district, bordering both Jharkhand and other areas within West Bengal. To the west, it shares an interstate boundary with Jharkhand’s Santhal Parganas, fostering economic ties, especially in stone mining. The east connects to Murshidabad district, supporting intra-state trade. The north, near Nalhati, is close to Jharkhand and near the Padma River and Bangladesh border, though it doesn't directly touch them. The southern boundary is shared with Mayureswar I & II and parts of Suri Sadar subdivision, marking internal administrative limits

== Overview ==
The northern portion of Rampurhat subdivision is part of the Nalhati Plains, a sub-micro physiographic region, and the southern portion is part of the Brahmani-Mayurakshi Basin, another sub-micro physiographic region occupying the area between the Brahmani in the north and the Mayurakshi in the south. There is an occasional intrusion of Rajmahal Hills, from adjoining Santhal Parganas, towards the north-western part of the subdivision.

== Geography ==
=== Subdivisions ===
Birbhum district is divided into the following administrative subdivisions:

Subdivision-wise Statistics of Birbhum District (2011 Census)
Subdivision	Headquarters	Area (km²) (2001)	Population (2011)	Rural population (%)	Urban population (%)
Rampurhat	Rampurhat	1,574.23	1,508,506	96.62	3.38
Suri Sadar	Suri	1,782.72	1,121,871	96.57	3.43
Bolpur	Bolpur	1,186.66	872,027	96.56	3.44
Birbhum district (Total)	–	4,545.00	3,502,404	96.59	3.41

Population distribution of subdivisions in Birbhum district (2011 Census)
1. Rampurhat – 1,508,506 (43.1%)
2. Suri Sadar – 1,121,871 (32.0%)
3. Bolpur – 872,027 (24.9%)

=== Administrative units ===
Cities and towns in Rampurhat subdivision of Birbhum district
M: municipal city/ town, CT: census town, R: rural/ urban centre.
Owing to space constraints in the small map, the actual locations in a larger map may vary slightly

Rampurhat subdivision has 5 police stations, 8 community development blocks, 8 panchayat samitis, 65 gram panchayats, 760 mouzas, 725 inhabited villages, 2 municipalities and 6 census towns. The municipalities are: Rampurhat and Nalhati. The census towns are: Murarai, Barua Gopalpur, Ambhua, Kashimnagar, Bishnupur and Fatehpur. The subdivision has its headquarters at Rampurhat.

=== Police stations ===
Police stations in Rampurhat subdivision have the following features and jurisdiction:

Police station	Area covered km^{2}	Municipal town	CD Block
Nalhati	359.5	Nalhati	Nalhati I, Nalhati II
Murarai	356.9	-	Murarai I, Murarai II
Mayureswar	381.0	-	Mayureswar II
Rampurhat	472.4	Rampurhat	Rampurhat I
Margram	n/a	-	Rampurhat II
Tarapith	n/a	n/a	Rampurhat II (Budhigram Gram Panchayat & Sahapur Gram Panchayat)
Mallarpur	n/a	n/a	Mayureswar I
Paikar	n/a	n/a	n/a

=== Blocks ===
Community development blocks in Rampurhat subdivision are:

CD Block	Headquarters	Area km^{2} (2001)	Population (2011)	SC %	ST %	Hindus %	Muslims %	Literacy rate %	Census Towns
Murarai I	Murarai	175.51	190,802	24.60	4.56	40.58	58.92	55.67	3
Murarai II	Paikar	185.33	222,033	18.04	0.54	24.91	75.00	58.28	1
Nalhati I	Nalhati	249.71	204,818	36.02	4.99	52.11	46.64	69.83	-
Nalhati II	Lohapur	109.15	127,785	21.26	0.41	29.79	70.10	71.68	-
Rampurhat I	Rampurhat	287.63	188,435	31.96	13.70	67.38	30.61	73.29	-
Rampurhat II	Margram	181.55	187,823	31.72	0.57	51.64	48.20	70.77	1
Mayureswar I	Mallarpur	224.83	159,782	34.07	6.69	69.84	29.33	71.52	1
Mayureswar II	Kotasur	156.27	127,661	30.67	7.12	74.06	25.65	70.89	-

=== Gram panchayats ===
The subdivision contains 65 gram panchayats under 8 community development blocks:

CD Blocks and Gram Panchayats in Rampurhat Subdivision
CD Block	Gram Panchayats
Mayureswar I	Baraturigram, Dakshingram, Mollarpur–I, Bajitpur, Jhikodda, Mollarpur–II, Dabuk, Kanachi, Talowan
Mayureswar II	Daspalsa, Kaleswar, Mayureswar, Ulkunda, Dheka, Kundola, Satpalsa
Rampurhat I	Ayas, Dakhalbati, Kusumba, Bonhat, Kasthagara, Mashra, Barshal, Kharun, Narayanpur
Rampurhat II	Bishnupur, Budhigram, Hansan–I, Margram–I, Hansan–II, Margram–II, Dunigram, Kaluha, Sahapur
Murarai I	Chatra, Gorsha, Murarai, Rajgram, Dumurgram, Mahurapur, Palsa
Murarai II	Amdole, Kushmore–II, Paikar–I, Jajigram, Mitrapur, Paikar–II, Kushmore–I, Nandigram, Rudranagar
Nalhati I	Banior, Haridaspur, Kaitha–II, Barla, Kalitha, Kurumgram, Bautia, Kaitha–I, Paikpara
Nalhati II	Bara–I, Bhadrapur–I, Noapara, Bara–II, Bhadrapur–II, Shitalgram

== Education ==
Birbhum district had a literacy rate of 70.68% as per the provisional figures of the 2011 census. Rampurhat subdivision had a literacy rate of 69.12%, Suri Sadar subdivision 71.16% and Bolpur subdivision 72.71%.

Given in the table below is a comprehensive picture of the education scenario in Birbhum district, with data for the year 2013-14:

Subdivision	Primary School		Middle School		High School		Higher Secondary School		General College, Univ		Technical / Professional Instt		Non-formal Education	
Subdivision	Institution	Student	Institution	Student	Institution	Student	Institution	Student	Institution	Student	Institution	Student	Institution	Student
Rampurhat	889	99,767	132	9,487	82	68,462	65	85,685	7	16,963	24	3,448	2,291	99,407
Suri Sadar	912	71,882	90	5,188	72	40,161	56	69,109	6	13,912	35	7,620	1,961	58,469
Bolpur	628	48,314	64	5,859	53	31,266	49	60,139	6	17,379	20	3,424	1,333	43,805
Birbhum district	2,429	219,263	286	20,534	207	139,889	170	214,925	19	48,254	79	14,492	5,585	201,681

The following institutions are located in Rampurhat subdivision:

- Rampurhat College was established at Rampurhat in 1950.
- Asleha Girls College was established at Rampurhat in 2009.
- Rampurhat Government Polytechnic was established at Rampurhat in 2015.
- Hiralal Bhakat College was established at Nalhati in 1986.
- Sofia Girls College was established at Nalhati in 2009.
- Nalhati Government Polytechnic was established at Nalhati in 2015.
- Lokepara Mahavidyalaya was established at Lokpara in 2010.
- Turku Hansda-Lapsa Hemram Mahavidyalaya was established at Madian in 2006.
- Kabi Nazrul College was established at Murarai in 1985.
- Murarai Government Polytechnic was established at Murarai in 2015.

== Healthcare ==
Rampurhat Health District is an initiative aimed at strengthening the healthcare infrastructure in Rampurhat, the most populous subdivision of West Bengal, with a focus on delivering affordable, accessible, and high-quality health services. Its headquarters is located in Rampurhat. Medical facilities in Rampurhat Health District are as follows:

Hospitals in Rampurhat Health District
Name	Location	Beds
Rampurhat Government Medical College and Hospital	Rampurhat	626
Murarai State General Hospital	Murarai	100
Rampurhat Railway Health Unit	Rampurhat	2

Rural Hospitals:

Rural Hospitals in Rampurhat Health District
Community Development Block	Name	Location	Beds
Rampurhat II	Baswa Rural Hospital	Baswa	30
Murarai I	Murarai Rural Hospital	Murarai	50
Murarai II	Paikar Rural Hospital	Paikar	30
Nalhati I	Nalhati Rural Hospital	Nalhati	30
Mayureswar I	Mallarpur Rural Hospital	Mallarpur	30
Mayureswar II	Satpalsa (Basudebpur) Rural Hospital	Basudebpur	30

Block Primary Health Centres:

Block Primary Health Centres (BPHCs) in Rampurhat Health District
Name	Community Development Block	Location	Beds
Lohapur Block Primary Health Centre	Nalhati II	Lohapur	15
Chakmandala Block Primary Health Centre	Rampurhat I	Chakmandala	15

Primary Health Centres:

Primary Health Centres (PHCs) in Rampurhat Health District
Community Development Block	PHC Location	Beds
Murarai I	Rajgram	10
Murarai I	Chatra	6
Murarai II	Jajigram	10
Murarai II	Rudranagar	10
Murarai II	Bhimpur	6
Murarai II	Kaitha Idrakpur	6
Nalhati I	Kaitha	6
Nalhati I	Kurumgram	6
Nalhati I	Sonarkundu	10
Nalhati II	Sitalgram	6
Nalhati II	Bhadrapur	10
Rampurhat I	Kasthagara	6
Rampurhat I	Baidara (PO Haridaspur)	10
Rampurhat I	Udaypur (PO Dhekuria)	6
Rampurhat I	Narayanpur	10
Rampurhat II	Tarapur	6
Rampurhat II	Margram	10
Rampurhat II	Dunigram	6
Mayureswar I	Talwa	6
Mayureswar I	Ratma (PO Daksingram)	6
Mayureswar II	Noapara-Ulkunda (PO Gunutia)	10
Mayureswar II	Dheka (PO Kuliara)	6
Mayureswar II	Hatinagar (PO Kotasur)	6

== Electoral constituencies ==
Lok Sabha (parliamentary) and Vidhan Sabha (state assembly) constituencies in Rampurhat subdivision were as follows:

Lok Sabha constituency	Reservation	Vidhan Sabha constituency	Reservation	CD Block and/or Gram panchayats and/or municipal areas
Birbhum	None	Murarai	None	Murarai I CD Block, and Amdole, Jajigram, Mitrapur, Nandigram, Paikar I and Paikar II GPs of Murarai II CD Block
-	-	Nalhati	None	Nalhati I CD Block, and Kushmore I, Kushmore II and Rudranagar GPs of Murarai II CD Block
-	-	Hansan	None	Rampurhat II and Nalhati II CD Blocks
-	-	Rampurhat	None	Rampurhat munuicipality, Rampurhat I CD Block and Bharkata, Gonpur, Hinglow, Kapista, Rampur and Sekedda GPs of Mohammad Bazar CD Block
-	-	All other Vidhan Sabha segments outside Rampurhat subdivision	-	
Bolpur	SC	Mayureswar	None	Mayureswar I and Mayureswar II CD Blocks
-	-	All other Vidhan Sabha segments outside Rampurhat subdivision	-	

== Notable people ==
- Khan Bahadur Mudassir Hossain, MLA for Birbhum
- Muhammad Qudrat-i-Khuda
