= Land reform in India =

Efforts to reform ownership of land in India

Land reform in India refers to efforts to change the ownership and regulation of land in India. Land reforms redistributed lands by the government from landholders to landless people for agriculture

== Goals ==
Land distribution has been part of India's state policy from the very beginning. Independent India's most revolutionary land policy was perhaps the abolition of the Zamindari system (feudal landholding practices). Land-reform policy in India had two specific objectives: "The first is to remove such impediments to increase in agricultural production as arise from the agrarian structure inherited from the past. The second objective, which is closely related to the first, is to eliminate all elements of exploitation and social injustice within the agrarian system, to provide security for the tiller of the soil and assure equality of status and opportunity to all sections of the rural population.” (Government of India 1961 as quoted by Appu 1996.)

== Categories ==
There are six main categories of reforms:

- Abolition of intermediaries (rent collectors under the pre-Independence land revenue system);
- Tenancy regulation (to improve the contractual terms including the security of tenure);
- A ceiling on landholdings (to redistributing surplus land to the landless);
- Attempts to consolidate disparate landholdings;
- encouragement of cooperative joint farming;
- settlement and regulation of tenancy.

== History ==
Since its independence in 1947, there has been voluntary and state-initiated/mediated land reforms in several states with dual objective of efficient use of land and ensuring social justice. The most notable and successful example of land reforms are in the states of West Bengal, Kerala and Andhra Pradesh. Other than these state-sponsored attempts of reforming land ownership and control, there was another attempt to bring changes in the regime which achieved limited success; famously known as Bhoodan movement (Government of India, Ministry of Rural Development 2003, Annex XXXIX). Some other research has shown that during the movement, in the Vidarbha region, 14 percent of the land records are incomplete, thus prohibiting transfer to the poor. 24 percent of the land promised had never actually become part of the movement. The Gramdan which arguably took place in 160,000 pockets did not legalise the process under the state laws (Committee on Land Reform 2009, 77, Ministry of Rural Development).

Soon United Front came into power in West Bengal on 1967 the Communist Party of India (Marxist) leader Hare Krishna Konar and Benoy Choudhury started the India's first land reform on 1967 this was enacted up to the united front loss its power on 1971 and after 6 years in 1977, the Communist Party of India (Marxist) (CPI(M)) kept their word and initiated gradual land reforms, such as Operation Barga. The result was a more equitable distribution of land among the landless farmers, and enumeration of landless farmers. This has ensured an almost lifelong loyalty from the farmers and the communists were in power till 2011 assembly election.

In land reform in Kerala, the only other large state where the CPI(M) came to power, state administrations have actually carried out the most extensive land, tenancy and agrarian labour wage reforms in the non-socialist late-industrialising world. Another successful land reform program was launched in Jammu and Kashmir after 1947.

In Andhra Pradesh, land reforms were primarily implemented through The Andhra Pradesh Land Reforms (Ceiling on Agricultural Holdings) Act, 1973. This enactment led to ceilings set upon agricultural holdings and the acquisition of surplus lands by the state. Moreover, efforts had been made through this legislation to provide redistribution of the said surplus land to the landless and weaker sections, whose livelihood depended on farming. This legislation also included measures that aimed at protecting certain tenants along with restrictions placed upon the transfer or division of the land in order to evade the ceiling provisions. Surplus land was to be distributed for agricultural and housing purposes, with preference given to members of Scheduled Castes, Scheduled Tribes, and other disadvantaged groups. Despite the Act, as of 2004, over 147,000 acres of declared surplus land remained involved in litigation, while a substantial portion of surplus land had yet to be distributed.

All in all, land reforms have been successful only in pockets of the country, as people have often found loopholes in the laws that set limits on the maximum area of land that is allowed to be held by any one person.

Ernest Feder, a specialist of rural economics, has said of the matter:

"...though since 1947, India has enacted perhaps more land reform legislation than any other country in the world, it has not succeeded in changing in any essentials the power pattern, the deep economic disparities, nor the traditional hierarchical nature of intergroup relationships which govern the economic life of village society."

== Land ceilings ==
The following table shows land ceilings for each state in India.

No.	State	Ceiling (family)	Ceiling (individual)	Companies	Exempted from ceiling
1	Kerala	10 standard acres (up to 5 members); 15 standard acres (more than 10 members)	5 standard acres		Plantations
2	Tamil Nadu	30 standard acres (up to 5 members);	5 standard acres	15 standard acres	Plantations
3	West Bengal		24.7 acres		mills, factories, workshop, tea gardens, livestock breeding farm, poultry farm, dairy, industrial park or industrial hub or industrial estate, fishery, transportation or terminal, logistic hub, township, financial hub, logistic hub, educational and medical institutions, oil and gas products piped transportation, and mining and allied activities
4	Andhra Pradesh	10 to 27 acres (wet land); 35 to 54 acres (dry land) (up to 5 members)	10 acres (wet land); 35 acres (dry land)		State and Central Governments, religious, charitable, and educational institutions, local authorities, Government Corporations

== See also ==
- Urban Land (Ceiling and Regulation) Act, 1976
- Right to Fair Compensation and Transparency in Land Acquisition, Rehabilitation, and Resettlement Act, 2013
- Land reform in Kerala
- Land conflict in India
- Land acquisition in India
