= Brahmani River (Dwarka) =

Coordinates: 24°16′39″N 87°50′02″E

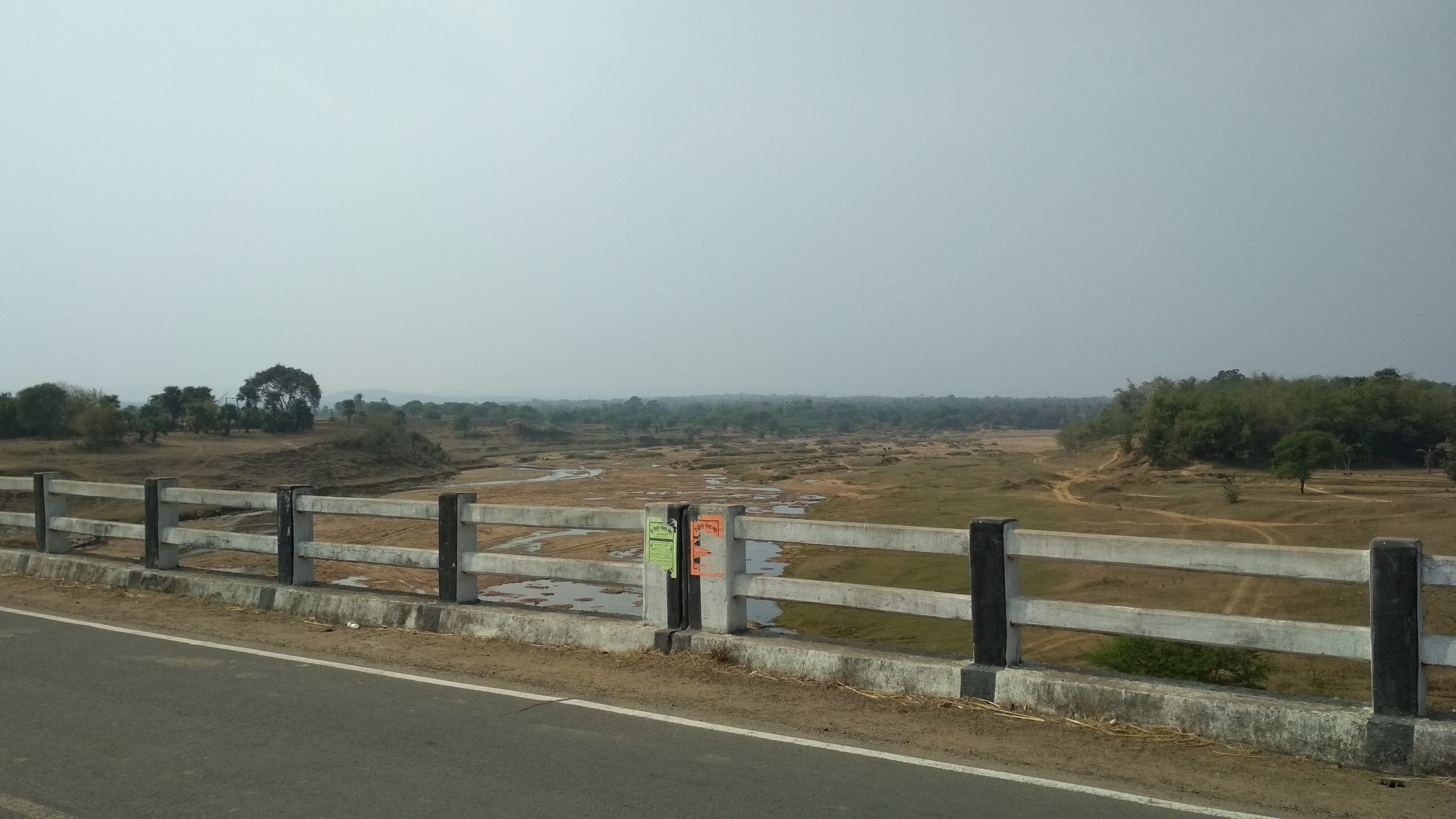
- Brahmani River

Location
- Country: India
- State: Jharkhand, West Bengal
- Cities: Dumka, Rampurhat

Physical characteristics
- Source
  - location: Kathikund, Dumka, Santhal Parganas
- Discharge
  - location: Dwarka River

The Brahmani River is a tributary of the Dwarka River.

== Course ==
The Brahmani originates in the Santhal Parganas in Jharkhand and then flows through Birbhum district, bisecting Rampurhat subdivision. It finally flows through Murshidabad district, where it joins the Dwarka River.

It is a hill stream with beds full of pebbles and yellow clay.

== Baidhara barrage ==
Baidhara barrage on the Brahmani has a capacity of 540,000 cubic metres (440 acre⋅ft),

== Gallery ==
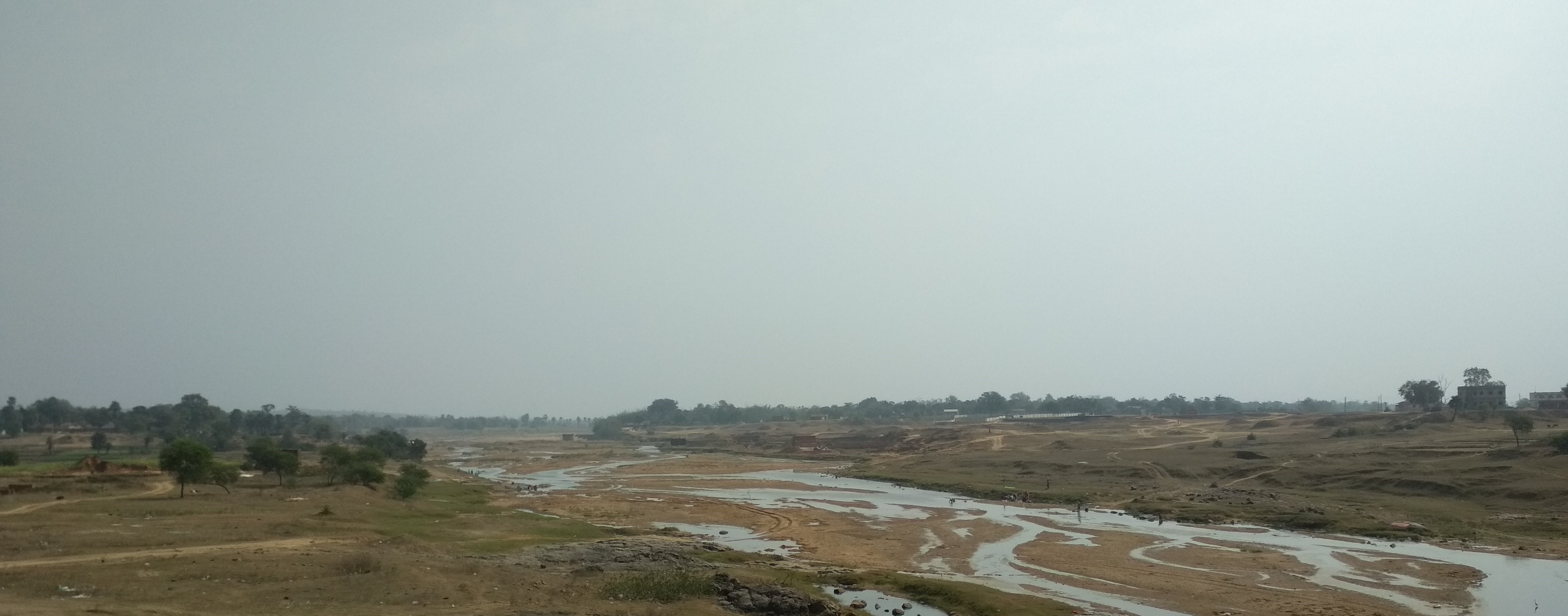
Brahmani River panoramic view

== See also ==
- Santhal Parganas
- List of rivers of India
