= Ilambazar (community development block) =

- Community development block
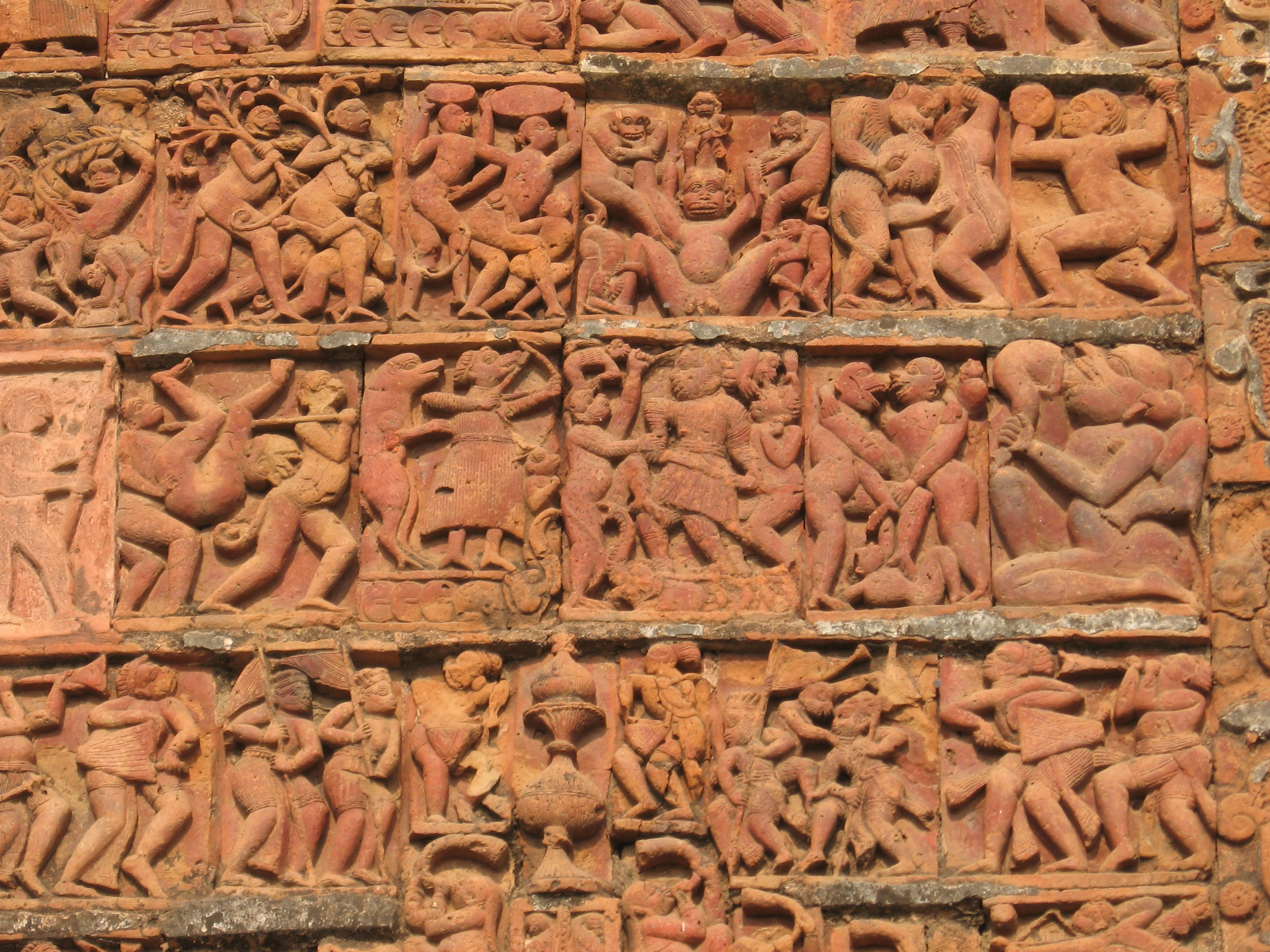
- Terracota carvings in Radhabinode temple at Jaydev Kenduli

- Location in West Bengal
- Coordinates: 23°38′N 87°32′E
- Country: India
- State: West Bengal
- District: Birbhum
- Parliamentary constituency: Bolpur
- Assembly constituency: Bolpur

Area
  - Total: 261.54 km^{2} (100.98 sq mi)

Population (2011)
  - Total: 168,709
  - Density: 645.06/km^{2} (1,670.7/sq mi)
- Time zone: UTC+5.30 (IST)
- Literacy Rate: 74.27 per cent
- Website: http://birbhum.nic.in/

Ilambazar is a community development block that forms an administrative division in Bolpur subdivision of Birbhum district in the Indian state of West Bengal.

== Overview ==
Birbhum district is physiographically a part of the ancient Rarh region. The western portion of the district is basically an extension of the Chota Nagpur Plateau. The area has mostly loose reddish lateritic low fertility soil. In the east, the flood plains of the major rivers, such as the Ajay, Bakreshwar, Mayurakshi and Brahmani, have soft alluvial soil. The forest cover is only 3.5% of the total district. Although coal is found in the district and Bakreshwar Thermal Power Station has a capacity of 1050MW, the economic condition of Birbhum is dominated by agriculture. From 1977 onwards major land reforms took place in West Bengal. Land in excess of land ceiling was acquired and distributed amongst the peasants. In Birbhum district, 19,968 hectares of vested agricultural land has been distributed amongst 161,515 beneficiaries, till 2011. However, more than 38% of the operational land holding is marginal or less than 1 acre. The proportion of agricultural labourers amongst total workers in Birbhum district is 45.9%, the highest amongst all districts of West Bengal. Culturally rich Birbhum, with such traditional landmarks as Jaydev Kenduli and Chandidas Nanoor, is home to Visva-Bharati University at Santiniketan, having close association with two Nobel laureates – Rabindranath Tagore and Amartya Sen.

== Geography ==
Map of Birbhum district showing CD blocks and municipal areas. Click on the map to view larger map.

Ilambazar is located at 23°38′N 87°32′E.

Ilambazar CD Block is part of the Suri-Bolpur Plain, one of the four sub-micro physiographic regions of Birbhum district. It covers the interfluves of the Mayurakshi and Ajay rivers, in the south-eastern part of the district. This area exhibits somewhat upland topography sloping from north-west to south-east.

Ilambazar CD Block is bounded by Suri II CD Block on the north, Bolpur Sriniketan CD Block on the east, Kanksa and Faridpur Durgapur CD Blocks, in Paschim Bardhaman district, across the Ajay on the south and Dubrajpur CD Block on the west.

Ilambazar CD Block has an area of 261.54 km^{2}. It has 1 panchayat samity, 9 gram panchayats, 86 gram sansads (village councils), 134 mouzas and 128 inhabited villages, as per District Statistical Handbook Birbhum 2008. Ilambazar police station serves this block. Headquarters of this CD Block is at Ilambazar.

Gram panchayats of Ilambazar block/panchayat samiti are: Batikar, Bilati, Dharampur, Gurisha, Illambazar, Jaydev Kenduli, Mongaldihi, Nanasole and Sirsha.

== Demographics ==
=== Population ===
As per the 2011 Census of India, Ilambazar CD Block had a total population of 168,709, of which 161,584 were rural and 7,125 were urban. There were 86,688 (51%) males and 82,021 (49%) females. Population below 6 years was 21,097. Scheduled Castes numbered 39,866 (23.63%) and Scheduled Tribes numbered 15,087 (8.94%).

As per 2001 census, Ilambazar block had a total population of 144,490, out of which 74,366 were males and 70,124 were females. Ilambazar block registered a population growth of 19.52 per cent during the 1991-2001 decade. Decadal growth for Birbhum district was 17.88 per cent. Decadal growth in West Bengal was 17.84 per cent.

Census Town in Ilambazar CD Block is (2011 census figures in brackets): Ilambazar (7,125).

Large villages (with 4,000+ population) in Ilambazar CD Block are (2011 census figures in brackets): Sahapur (4,369), Shripur (4,134) and Chaupahari Jangal (4,445).

Other villages in Ilambazar CD Block include (2011 census figures in brackets): Jaydev Kenduli (3,280), Batikor (3,086), Nanasol (265), Mangaldidhi (2,668), Dharampur (1,127), Shirsha (2,319), Bilati (749)and Makra (1480).

=== Literacy ===
As per the 2011 census the total number of literates in Ilambazar CD Block was 109,023 (74.27% of the population over 6 years) out of which males numbered 60,663 (80.40% of the male population over 6 years) and females numbered 48,360 (67.78% of the female population over 6 years). The gender disparity (the difference between female and male literacy rates) was 12.62%.

See also – List of West Bengal districts ranked by literacy rate

Literacy in CD blocks of
Birbhum district
Rampurhat subdivision
Murarai I – 55.67%
Murarai II – 58.28%
Nalhati I – 69.83%
Nalhati II – 71.68%
Rampurhat I – 73.29%
Rampurhat II – 70.77%
Mayureswar I – 71.52%
Mayureswar II – 70.89%
Suri Sadar subdivision
Mohammad Bazar – 65.18%
Rajnagar – 68.10%
Suri I – 72.75%
Suri II – 72.75%
Sainthia – 72.33%
Dubrajpur – 68.26%
Khoyrasol – 68.75%
Bolpur subdivision
Bolpur Sriniketan – 70.67%
Ilambazar – 74.27%
Labpur – 71.20%
Nanoor – 69.45%
2011 Census: CD Block Wise

Primary Census Abstract Data

=== Language and religion ===
Religion in Ilambazar CD block (2011)
| Hinduism | 51.67% |
| Islam | 47.41% |
| santal | 0.63% |
| Other or not stated | 0.29% |

In the 2011 census, Hindus numbered 87,180 and formed 51.67% of the population in Ilambazar CD Block. Muslims numbered 79,990 and formed 47.41% of the population. Christians numbered 130 and formed 0.08% of the population. Others numbered 1,400 and formed 0.84% of the population.

The proportion of Hindus in Birbhum district has declined from 72.2% in 1961 to 62.3% in 2011. The proportion of Muslims in Birbhum district has increased from 27.6% to 37.1% during the same period. Christians formed 0.3% in 2011.

Languages in Ilambazar CD block (2011)
1. Bengali (91.5%)
2. Santali (8.17%)
3. Others (0.38%)

At the time of the 2011 census, 91.45% of the population spoke Bengali and 8.17% Santali as their first language.

== Rural poverty ==
As per the BPL household survey carried out in 2005, the proportion of BPL households in Ilambazar CD Block was 35.6%, against 42.3% in Birbhum district. In six CD Blocks – Murarai II, Nalhati II, Rampurhat II, Rampurhat I, Suri II and Murarai I – the proportion of BPL families was more than 50%. In three CD Blocks – Rajnagar, Suri I and Labhpur – the proportion of BPL families was less than 30%. The other ten CD Blocks in Birbhum district were placed in between. According to the District Human Development Report, Birbhum, “Although there is no indication that the share of BPL households is more in blocks with higher share of agricultural labourer, there is a clear pattern that the share of BPL households is more in blocks with disadvantaged population in general and Muslim population in particular.” (The disadvantaged population includes SCs, STs and Muslims.)

== Economy ==
=== Livelihood ===
Livelihood
in Ilambazar CD Block
1. Cultivators (19.1%)
2. Agricultural labourers (53.2%)
3. Household industries (4.97%)
4. Other Workers (22.7%)

In Ilambazar CD Block in 2011, amongst the class of total workers, cultivators numbered 12,374 and formed 19.08%, agricultural labourers numbered 34,501 and formed 53.20%, household industry workers numbered 3,226 and formed 4.97% and other workers numbered 14,747 and formed 22.74%. Total workers numbered 64,848 and formed 38.44% of the total population, and non-workers numbered 103,861and formed 61.56% of the population.

Note: In the census records a person is considered a cultivator, if the person is engaged in cultivation/ supervision of land owned by self/government/institution. When a person who works on another person's land for wages in cash or kind or share, is regarded as an agricultural labourer. Household industry is defined as an industry conducted by one or more members of the family within the household or village, and one that does not qualify for registration as a factory under the Factories Act. Other workers are persons engaged in some economic activity other than cultivators, agricultural labourers and household workers. It includes factory, mining, plantation, transport and office workers, those engaged in business and commerce, teacher s, entertainment artistes and so on.

=== Infrastructure ===
There are 127 inhabited villages in Ilambazar CD Block, as per District Census Handbook, Birbhum, 2011. 100% villages have power supply. 123 villages (96.85%) have drinking water supply. 31 villages (24.41%) have post offices. 114 villages (89.76%) have telephones (including landlines, public call offices and mobile phones). 40 villages (31.50%) have pucca (paved) approach roads and 63 villages (49.61%) have transport communication (includes bus service, rail facility and navigable waterways). 16 villages (12.60%) have agricultural credit societies and 9 villages (7.09%) have banks.

=== Agriculture ===
Following land reforms land ownership pattern has undergone transformation. In 2004-05 (the agricultural labourer data is for 2001), persons engaged in agriculture in IlambazarCD Block could be classified as follows: bargadars 7,975 (15.85%), patta (document) holders 8,315 (16.52%), small farmers (possessing land between 1 and 2 hectares) 4,865 (9.67%), marginal farmers (possessing land up to 1 hectare) 5,750 (11.43%) and agricultural labourers 23,243 (46.54%).

Birbhum is a predominantly paddy cultivation-based agricultural district. The area under paddy cultivation in 2010-11 was 249,000 hectares of land. Paddy is grown in do, suna and sali classes of land. There is double to triple cropping system for paddy cultivation. Other crops grown in Birbhum are gram, masuri, peas, wheat, linseed, khesari, til, sugarcane and occasionally cotton. 192,470 hectares of cultivable land is under irrigation by different sources, such as canals, tanks, river lift irrigation and different types of tubewells. In 2009–10, 158,380 hectares were irrigated by canal water. There are such major irrigation projects as Mayurakshi and Hijli. Other rivers such as Ajoy, Brahmani, Kuskurni, Dwaraka, Hingla and Kopai are also helpful for irrigation in the district.

In 2013–14, there were 72 fertiliser depots, 19 seed stores and 37 fair price shops in Ilambazar CD block.

In 2013–14, Ilambazar CD block produced 175,348 tonnes of Aman paddy, the main winter crop, from 3,963 hectares, 14,744 tonnes of Boro paddy (spring crop) from 5,421 hectares, 2,146 tonnes of wheat from 800 hectares, 11,009 tonnes of potatoes from 526 hectares and 1,130 tonnes of sugar cane from 18 hectares. It also produced pulses and oilseeds.

In 2013–14, the total area irrigated in Ilambazar CD block was 7,860 hectares, out of which 3,580 hectares were irrigated by canal water, 80 hectares by tank water, 90 hectares by river lift irrigation, 1220 hectares by deep tube wells, 100 hectares by shallow tube wells and 2,790 hectares by other means.

=== Banking ===
In 2025-26, Ilambazar CD block had offices of 7 commercial banks and 1 gramin banks.

=== Other sectors ===
According to the District Human Development Report, 2009, Birbhum is one of the most backward districts of West Bengal in terms of industrial development. Of the new industrial projects set-up in West Bengal between 1991 and 2005, only 1.23% came to Birbhum. Bakreshwar Thermal Power Station is the only large-scale industry in the district and employs about 5,000 people. There are 4 medium-scale industries and 4,748 registered small-scale industries.

The proportion of workers engaged in agriculture in Birbhum has been decreasing. According to the District Human Development Report, “more people are now engaged in non-agricultural activities, such as fishing, retail sales, vegetable vending, selling milk, and so on. As all these activities are at the lower end of the spectrum of marketable skills, it remains doubtful if these activities generate enough return for their family’s sustenance.”

=== Backward Regions Grant Fund ===
Birbhum district is listed as a backward region and receives financial support from the Backward Regions Grant Fund. The fund, created by the Government of India, is designed to redress regional imbalances in development. As of 2012, 272 districts across the country were listed under this scheme. The list includes 11 districts of West Bengal.

== Transport ==
Ilambazar CD block has 1 ferry service, 10 originating/ terminating bus routes. The nearest railway station is 18 km from the CD block headquarters.

SH 14, running from Dubrajpur (in Birbhum district) to Betai (in Nadia district) passes through Ilambazar CD Block (the portion in this CD Block was earlier a part of Panagarh-Morgram Highway). Bolpur-Kavi Jaydev Road connects Ilambazar to Bolpur-Santiniketan.

== Culture ==
Jaydev Kenduli is the site of one of the biggest and 800-year old religious fair held annually during Makar Sankranti. The 3-day fair attracts about 50,000 people. Bauls attend in large numbers. The Radhabinode temple has exquisite terracotta carvings, some depicting Ramayana scenes.

Khustigiri is the place where the tomb (mazhar sharif) of the Sufi saint Hazrat Syed Shah Abdullah Kermani is located. The respected saint belonged to the family of great Sufi saint Moinuddin Chishti of Ajmer Sharif fame. He conquered the minds of people of all communities with love, compassion and a sense of humanity. He lived about 500 years ago. Numerous pilgrims visit Khustigiri Dargah Sharif.

== Education ==
In 2013–14, Ilambazar CD block had 136 primary schools with 10,231 students, 18 middle schools with 1,844 students, 8 high schools with 5,614 students and 10 higher secondary schools with 10,986 students. Ilambazar CD Block had 1 general degree college with 1,054 students, 3 technical/ professional institutions with 384 students and 274 institutions for special and non-formal education with 10,898 students.

As per the 2011 census, in Ilambazar CD Block, amongst the 127 inhabited villages, 8 villages did not have a school, 40 villages had more than 1 primary school, 37 villages had at least 1 primary and 1 middle school and 17 villages had at least 1 middle and 1 secondary school. 8 villages had senior secondary schools. There were 2 degree colleges for arts, science and commerce and 1 engineering degree college in Ilambazar CD Block.

Illambazar Jatiya Yuva Computer Shaksharta Mission was established at Illambazar in 2019. It is recognized by Govt. Of India and also Govt of West Bengal, it offers Certificate, Diploma and Advance Diploma Courses. This Computer Training Centre is one of the best centres in Illambazar

Kabi Joydeb Mahavidyalaya was established at Ilambazar in 2007.

== Healthcare ==
In 2014, Ilambazar CD block had 1 rural hospital, 2 primary health centres and 1 private nursing home with total 64 beds and 7 doctors (excluding private bodies). It had 24 family welfare subcentres. 6,392 patients were treated indoor and 85,394 patients were treated outdoor in the hospitals, health centres and subcentres of the CD block.

As per 2011 census, in Ilambazar CD Block, 15 villages had primary health centres, 31 villages had primary health subcentres, 1 village had a maternity and child welfare centre, 2 villages had veterinary hospitals, 11 villages had medicine shops and out of the 127 inhabited villages 76 villages had no medical facilities.

Ilambazar Rural Hospital at Ilambazar has 30 beds. There are primary health centres at Batikar (10 beds) and Jaydev Kenduli (6 beds).
