= Bolpur Sriniketan =

- Community development block
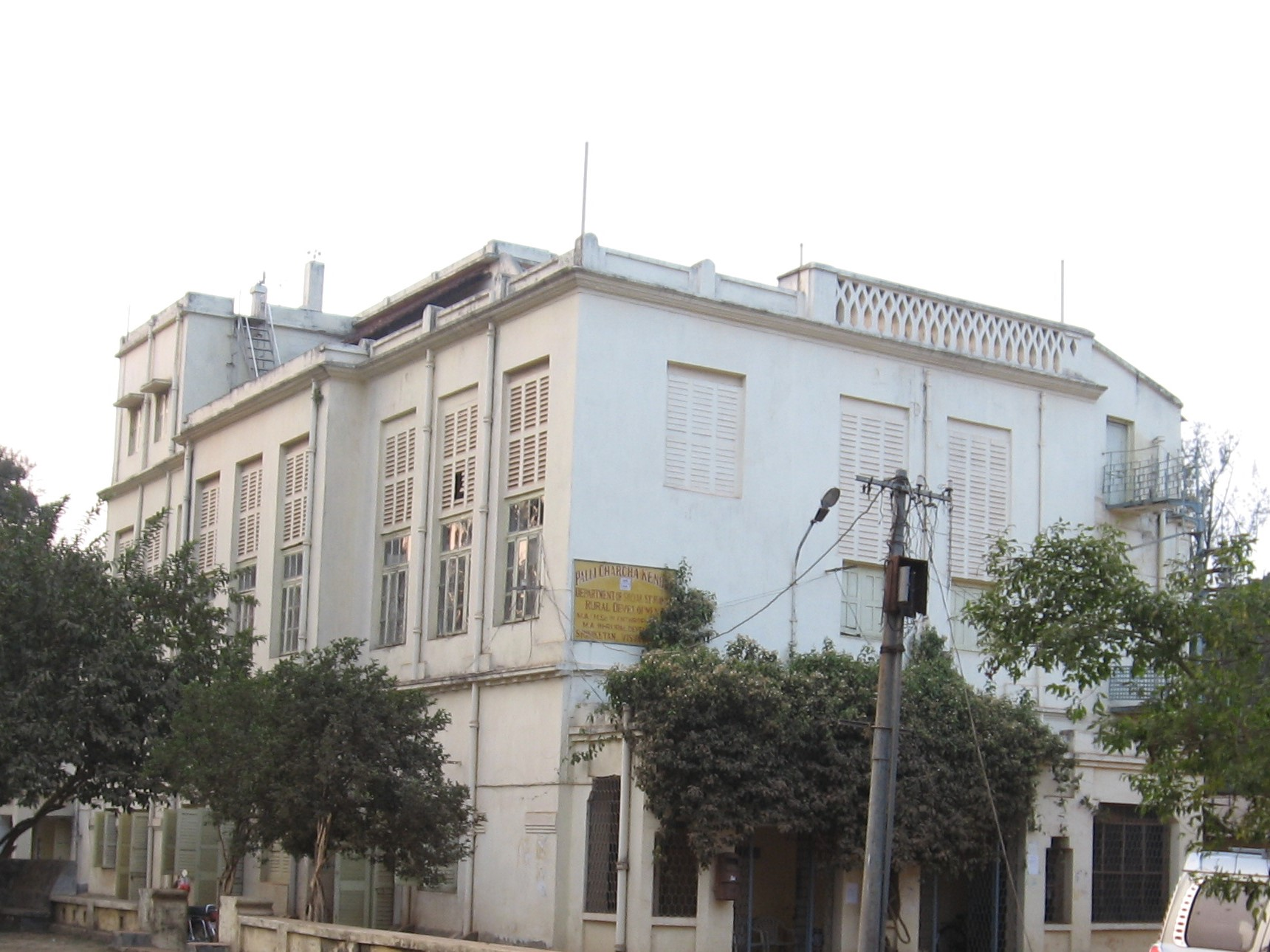
- Institute of Rural Reconstruction at Sriniketan

- Location in West Bengal
- Coordinates: 23°40′33″N 87°39′37″E
- Country: India
- State: West Bengal
- District: Birbhum
- Parliamentary constituency: Bolpur
- Assembly constituency: Bolpur, Nanoor

Area
  - Total: 334.58 km^{2} (129.18 sq mi)

Population (2011)
  - Total: 202,553
  - Density: 605.39/km^{2} (1,568.0/sq mi)
- Time zone: UTC+5.30 (IST)
- Literacy rate: 70.67 per cent
- Website: birbhum.nic.in

Bolpur Sriniketan is a community development block that forms an administrative division in Bolpur subdivision of Birbhum district in the Indian state of West Bengal.

== Overview ==
Birbhum district is physiographically a part of the ancient Rarh region. The western portion of the district is basically an extension of the Chota Nagpur Plateau. The area has mostly loose reddish lateritic low fertility soil. In the east, the flood plains of the major rivers, such as the Ajay, Bakreshwar, Mayurakshi and Brahmani, have soft alluvial soil. The forest cover is only 3.5% of the total district. Although coal is found in the district and Bakreshwar Thermal Power Station has a capacity of 2,010 MW, the economic condition of Birbhum is dominated by agriculture. From 1977 onwards major land reforms took place in West Bengal. Land in excess of land ceiling was acquired and distributed amongst the peasants. In Birbhum district, 19,968 hectares of vested agricultural land has been distributed amongst 161,515 beneficiaries, till 2011. However, more than 38% of the operational land holding is marginal or less than 1 acre. The proportion of agricultural labourers amongst total workers in Birbhum district is 45.9%, the highest amongst all districts of West Bengal. Culturally rich Birbhum, with such traditional landmarks as Jaydev Kenduli and Chandidas Nanoor, is home to Visva-Bharati University at Santiniketan, having close association with two Nobel laureates – Rabindranath Tagore and Amartya Sen.

== Geography ==
Map of Birbhum district showing CD blocks and municipal areas. Click on the map to view larger map.

Sriniketan is located at 23°40′33″N 87°39′37″E.

Bolpur Sriniketan CD Block is part of the Suri-Bolpur Plain, one of the four sub-micro physiographic regions of Birbhum district. It covers the interfluves of the Mayurakshi and Ajay rivers, in the south-eastern part of the district. This area exhibits somewhat upland topography, sloping from north-west to south-east.

Bolpur Sriniketan CD Block is bounded by Sainthia and Labpur CD Block on the north, Nanoor CD Block on the east, Ausgram II CD Block, in Purba Bardhaman district, across the Ajay on the south and Ilambazar CD Block on the west.

Bolpur Sriniketan CD Block has an area of 334.58 km^{2}. It has 1 panchayat samity, 9 gram panchayats, 99 gram sansads (village councils), 170 mouzas and 159 inhabited villages, as per District Statistical Handbook Birbhum 2008. Bolpur police station serves this block. Headquarters of this CD Block is at Sriniketan.

Gram panchayats of Bolpur Sriniketan block/panchayat samiti are: Bahiri-Panchosowa, Kankalitala, Kasba, Raipur Supur, Ruppur, Sarpalehanna-Albandha, Sattore, Sian-Muluk and Singhee.

== Demographics ==
=== Population ===
As per the 2011 Census of India, Bolpur Sriniketan CD Block had a total population of 202,553, of which 190,393 were rural and 12,160 were urban. There were 102,722 (51%) males and 99,831 (49%) females. Population below 6 years was 23,160. Scheduled Castes numbered 61,960 (30.59%) and Scheduled Tribes numbered 38,615 (19.06%), the highest amongst all CD Blocks in the district.

As per 2001 census, Bolpur Sriniketan block had a total population of 175,490, out of which 89,581 were males and 85,909 were females. Bolpur Sriniketan block registered a population growth of 15.42 per cent during the 1991-2001 decade. Decadal growth for Birbhum district was 17.88 per cent. Decadal growth in West Bengal was 17.84 per cent.

Census Town in Bolpur Sriniketan CD Block is (2011 census figures in brackets): Surul (12,160).

Large villages (with 4,000+ population) in Bolpur Sriniketan CD Block are (2011 census figures in brackets): Mehidipur (4,080), Bahiri (5,222), Sansat (4,551), Singi (5,723) and Ruppur (3,803),

Other villages in Bolpur Sriniketan CD Block include (2011 census figures in brackets): Kasba (2,611), Panchsoa (1,851), Shian (2,106), Muluk (3,361), Supur (1,803), Raipur (2,320) and Sarpalehana (1,109).

=== Literacy ===
As per the 2011 census, the total number of literates in Bolpur Sriniketan CD Block was 126,779 (70.67% of the population over 6 years) out of which males numbered 70,323 (77.29% of the male population over 6 years) and females numbered 56,456 (63.86% of the female population over 6 years). The gender disparity (the difference between female and male literacy rates) was 13.42%.

See also – List of West Bengal districts ranked by literacy rate

Literacy in CD blocks of
Birbhum district
Rampurhat subdivision
Murarai I – 55.67%
Murarai II – 58.28%
Nalhati I – 69.83%
Nalhati II – 71.68%
Rampurhat I – 73.29%
Rampurhat II – 70.77%
Mayureswar I – 71.52%
Mayureswar II – 70.89%
Suri Sadar subdivision
Mohammad Bazar – 65.18%
Rajnagar – 68.10%
Suri I – 72.75%
Suri II – 72.75%
Sainthia – 72.33%
Dubrajpur – 68.26%
Khoyrasol – 68.75%
Bolpur subdivision
Bolpur Sriniketan – 70.67%
Ilambazar – 74.27%
Labpur – 71.20%
Nanoor – 69.45%
2011 Census: CD Block Wise

Primary Census Abstract Data

=== Language and religion ===
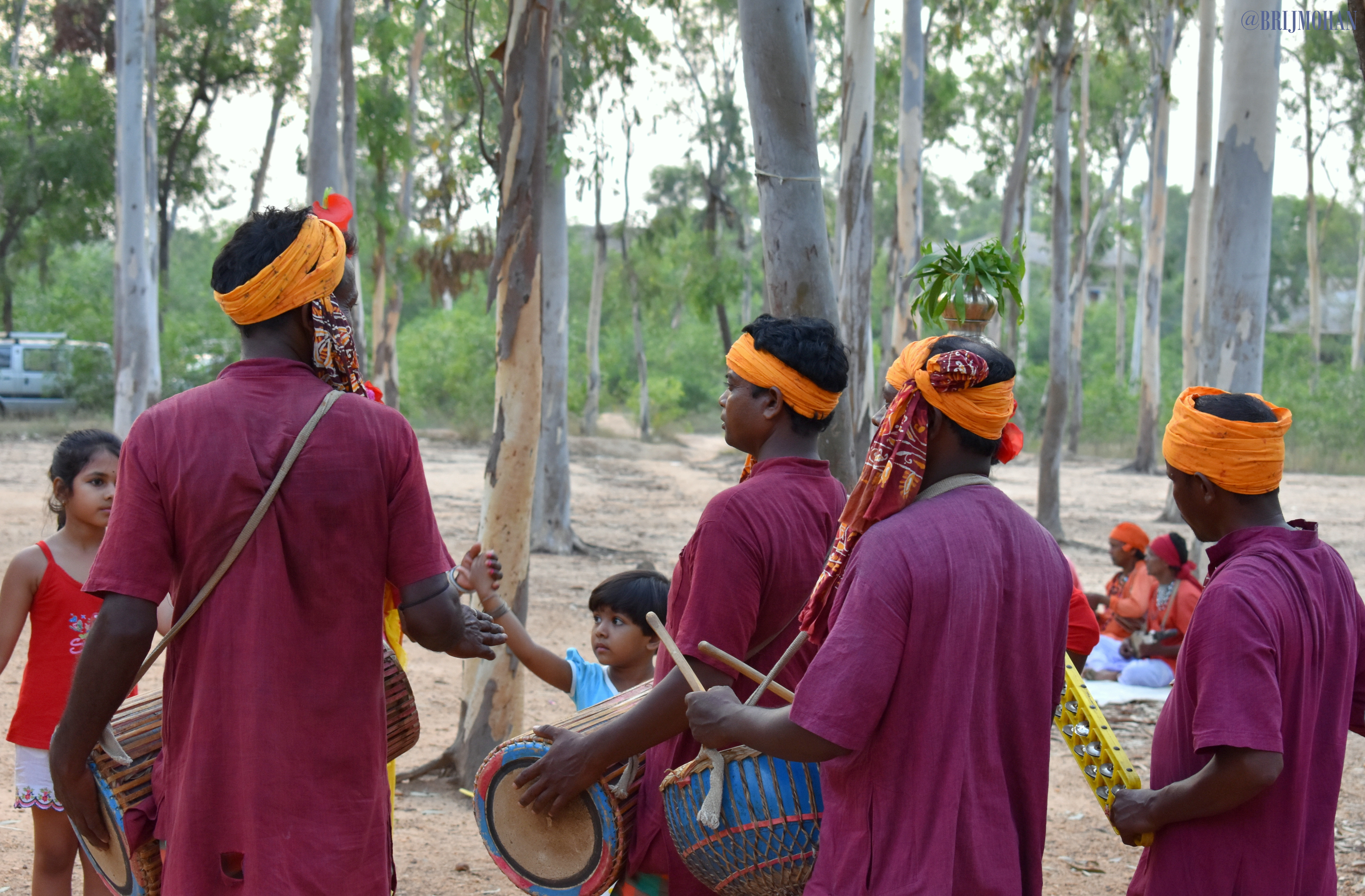
Santals in Sonajuri village, Bolpur

Religion in Bolpur Sriniketan CD block (2011)
Hinduism	73.92%
Islam	25.45%
Other or not stated	0.63%

In the 2011 census, Hindus numbered 149,736 and formed 73.92% of the population in Bolpur Sriniketan CD Block. Muslims numbered 51,550 and formed 25.45% of the population. Christians numbered 774 and formed 0.38% of the population. Others numbered 493 and formed 0.24% of the population.

The proportion of Hindus in Birbhum district has declined from 72.2% in 1961 to 62.3% in 2011. The proportion of Muslims in Birbhum district has increased from 27.6% to 37.1% during the same period. Christians formed 0.3% in 2011.

Languages in Bolpur Sriniketan CD block (2011)
1. Bengali (80.9%)
2. Santali (17.0%)
3. Koda (1.08%)
4. Others (1.02%)

At the time of the 2011 census, 80.92% of the population spoke Bengali, 16.98% Santali and 1.08% Koda as their first language.

== Rural poverty ==
As per the BPL household survey carried out in 2005, the proportion of BPL households in Bolpur Santiniketan CD Block was 38.6%, against 42.3% in Birbhum district. In six CD Blocks – Murarai II, Nalhati II, Rampurhat II, Rampurhat I, Suri II and Murarai I – the proportion of BPL families was more than 50%. In three CD Blocks – Rajnagar, Suri I and Labhpur – the proportion of BPL families was less than 30%. The other ten CD Blocks in Birbhum district were placed in between. According to the District Human Development Report, Birbhum, “Although there is no indication that the share of BPL households is more in blocks with higher share of agricultural labourer, there is a clear pattern that the share of BPL households is more in blocks with disadvantaged population in general and Muslim population in particular.” (The disadvantaged population includes SCs, STs and Muslims.)

== Economy ==
=== Livelihood ===
Livelihood
in Bolpur Sriniketan CD Block
1. Cultivators (15.7%)
2. Agricultural labourers (51.6%)
3. Household industries (3.69%)
4. Other Workers (29.0%)

In Bolpur Sriniketan CD Block in 2011, amongst the class of total workers, cultivators numbered 13,493 and formed 15.74%, agricultural labourers numbered 44,220 and formed 51.57%, household industry workers numbered 3,166 and formed 3.69% and other workers numbered 24,862 and formed 29.00%. Total workers numbered 85,741 and formed 42.33% of the total population, and non-workers numbered 116,812 and formed 57.67% of the population.

Note: In the census records a person is considered a cultivator, if the person is engaged in cultivation/ supervision of land owned by self/government/institution. When a person who works on another person's land for wages in cash or kind or share, is regarded as an agricultural labourer. Household industry is defined as an industry conducted by one or more members of the family within the household or village, and one that does not qualify for registration as a factory under the Factories Act. Other workers are persons engaged in some economic activity other than cultivators, agricultural labourers and household workers. It includes factory, mining, plantation, transport and office workers, those engaged in business and commerce, teacher s, entertainment artistes and so on.

=== Infrastructure ===
There are 156 inhabited villages in Bolpur Sriniketan CD Block, as per District Census Handbook, Birbhum, 2011. 100% villages have power supply. 155 villages (99.36%) have drinking water supply. 30 villages (19.23%) have post offices. 147 villages (94.23%) have telephones (including landlines, public call offices and mobile phones). 82 villages (52.56%) have pucca (paved) approach roads and 88 villages (56.41%) have transport communication (includes bus service, rail facility and navigable waterways). 9 villages (5.77%) have agricultural credit societies and 6 villages (3.85%) have banks.

=== Agriculture ===
Following land reforms land ownership pattern has undergone transformation. In 2004-05 (the agricultural labourer data is for 2001), persons engaged in agriculture in Bolpur Sriniketan CD Block could be classified as follows: bargadars 8,584 (11.14%), patta (document) holders 17,806 (23.10%), small farmers (possessing land between 1 and 2 hectares) 6,500 (8.43%), marginal farmers (possessing land up to 1 hectare) 10,000 (12.97%) and agricultural labourers 34,187 (44.35%).

Birbhum is a predominantly paddy cultivation-based agricultural district. The area under paddy cultivation in 2010-11 was 249,000 hectares of land. Paddy is grown in do, suna and sali classes of land. There is double to triple cropping system for paddy cultivation. Other crops grown in Birbhum are gram, masuri, peas, wheat, linseed, khesari, til, sugarcane and occasionally cotton. 192,470 hectares of cultivable land is under irrigation by different sources, such as canals, tanks, river lift irrigation and different types of tubewells. In 2009-10, 158,380 hectares were irrigated by canal water. There are such major irrigation projects as Mayurakshi and Hijli. Other rivers such as Ajoy, Brahmani, Kuskurni, Dwaraka, Hingla and Kopai are also helpful for irrigation in the district.

In 2013-14, there were 2 fertiliser depots, 10 seed stores and 114 fair price shops in Bolpur Sriniketan CD block.

In 2013-14, Bolpur Sriniketan CD block produced 144,863 tonnes of Aman paddy, the main winter crop, from 44,379 hectares, 2,724 tonnes of Aus paddy (summer crop) from 2,231 hectares, 12,440 tonnes of Boro paddy (spring crop) from 3,856 hectares, 3,186 tonnes of wheat from 1,120 hectares, 3,374 tonnes of potatoes from 222 hectares and 463 tonnes of sugar cane from 7 hectares. It also produced pulses and oilseeds.

In 2013-14, the total area irrigated in Bolpur Sriniketan CD block was 18,339 hectares, out of which 12,964 hectares were irrigated by canal water, 500 hectares by tank water, 2,825 hectares by deep tube wells, 1,000 hectares by shallow tube wells and 1,050 hectares by other means.

=== Banking ===
In 2013-14, Bolpur Sriniketan CD block had offices of 23 commercial banks and 5 gramin banks.

=== Other sectors ===
According to the District Human Development Report, 2009, Birbhum is one of the most backward districts of West Bengal in terms of industrial development. Of the new industrial projects set-up in West Bengal between 1991 and 2005, only 1.23% came to Birbhum. Bakreshwar Thermal Power Station is the only large-scale industry in the district and employs about 5,000 people. There are 4 medium-scale industries and 4,748 registered small-scale industries.

The proportion of workers engaged in agriculture in Birbhum has been decreasing. According to the District Human Development Report, “more people are now engaged in non-agricultural activities, such as fishing, retail sales, vegetable vending, selling milk, and so on. As all these activities are at the lower end of the spectrum of marketable skills, it remains doubtful if these activities generate enough return for their family’s sustenance.”

=== Backward Regions Grant Fund ===
Birbhum district is listed as a backward region and receives financial support from the Backward Regions Grant Fund. The fund, created by the Government of India, is designed to redress regional imbalances in development. As of 2012, 272 districts across the country were listed under this scheme. The list includes 11 districts of West Bengal.

== Transport ==
Bolpur Sriniketan CD block has 34 originating/ terminating bus routes.

The Khana-Barharwa section of Sahibganj loop passes through this block. There are stations at Bolpur Shantiniketan, Prantik and Kopai.

NH 114, running from Mallarpur to Barddhaman, passes through this block. Suri-Bolpur Road connects Bolpur-Santiketan to Suri and Bolpur-Kavi Jaydev Road links Bolpur Santiniketan to Ilambazar.

== Culture ==
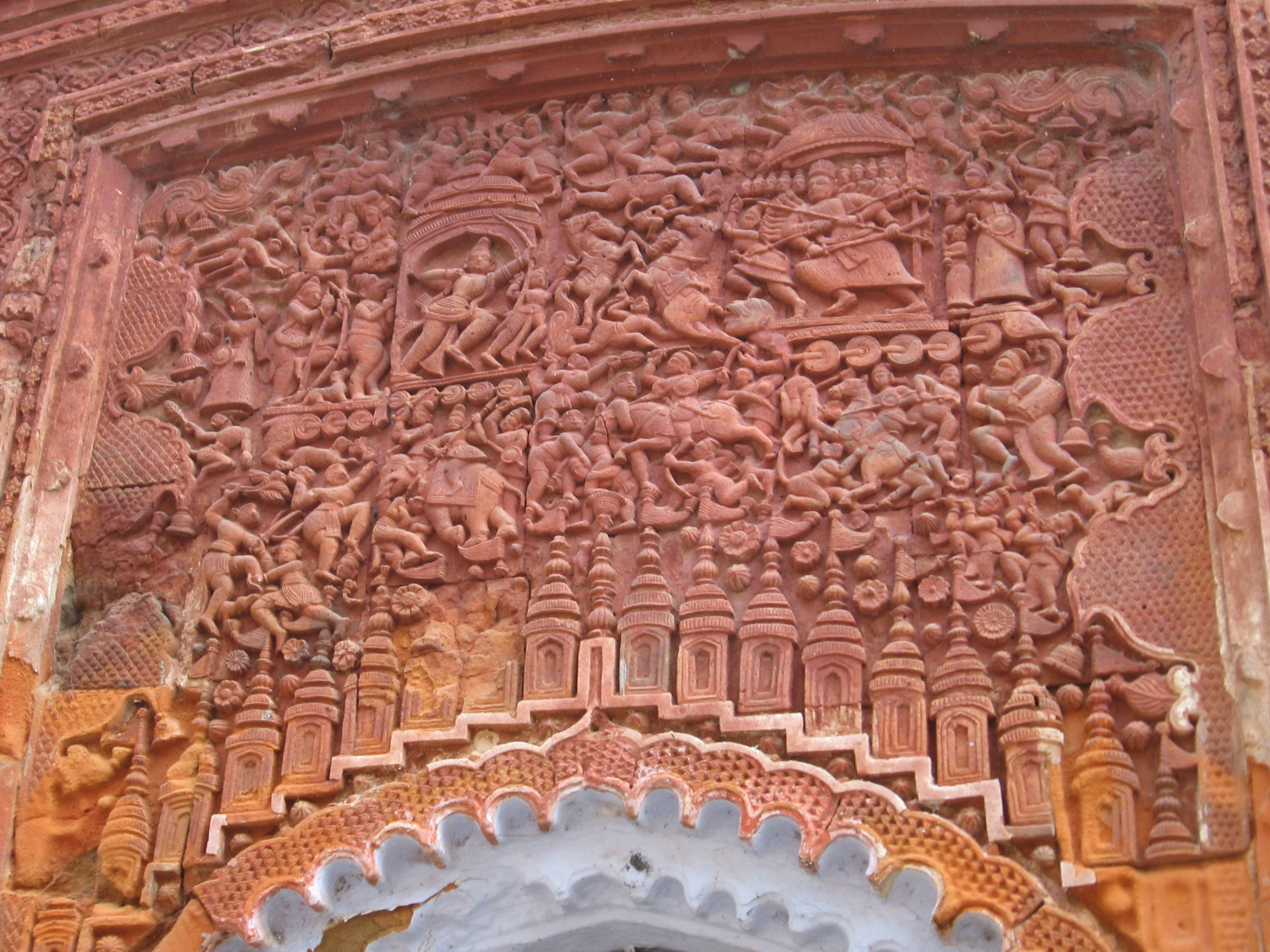
Terracotta carving with Ramayana theme at Surul

Santiniketan, where Visva-Bharati University is located, attracts 1.2 million visitors annually. Apart from the educational institutions, the major attractions include Rabindra Bhavan, Upasana Griha (glass temple), and some of the buildings associated with Rabindranath Tagore - Udayan, Shyamali, Konark, Udichi and Punascha. Poush Mela and different festivals attract visitors in large numbers.

Surul, 3 miles from Bolpur, has the most exquisitely decorated temples.

== Education ==
In 2013-14, Bolpur Sriniketan CD block had 151 primary schools with 10,805 students, 10 middle schools with 1,124 students, 12 high schools with 6,688 students and 13 higher secondary schools with 14,391 students. Bolpur Sriniketan CD Block had 1 university/ general degree college with 6,156 students, 6 technical/ professional institutions with 1,815 students and 415 institutions for special and non-formal education with 11,392 students. Bolpur municipal area had 2 university/ general degree colleges (outside the CD block).

As per the 2011 census, in Bolpur Sriniketan CD Block, amongst the 156 inhabited villages, 13 villages did not have a school, 50 villages had more than 1 primary school, 52 villages had at least 1 primary and 1 middle school and 32 villages had at least 1 middle and 1 secondary school. 17 villages had senior secondary schools. There were 2 engineering degree college in Bolpur Sriniketan CD Block.

Bengal Institute of Technology & Management, a private engineering college on Santiniketan-Sriniketan Bypass, PO Dwaranda, was established in 2001.

== Healthcare ==
In 2014, Bolpur Sriniketan CD block had 1 hospital, 3 primary health centres, 1 central government medical facility and 6 private nursing homes with total 310 beds and 35 doctors (excluding private bodies). It had 30 family welfare subcentres. 32,154 patients were treated indoor and 216,784 patients were treated outdoor in the hospitals, health centres and subcentres of the CD block.

As per 2011 census, in Bolpur Sriniketan CD Block, 1 village had a community health centre, 3 villages had primary health centres, 62 villages had primary health subcentres, 10 villages had maternity and child welfare centres, 2 villages had veterinary hospitals, 9 villages had medicine shops and out of the 156 inhabited villages 79 villages had no medical facilities.

Bolpur Block Primary Health Centre at Bolpur has 60 beds. There are primary health centres at Panchsowa (6 beds), Sattore Kasba (PO Sattore) (10 beds) and Supur (PO Rajatpur) (10 beds).
