= Nanoor (community development block) =

- Community Development Block
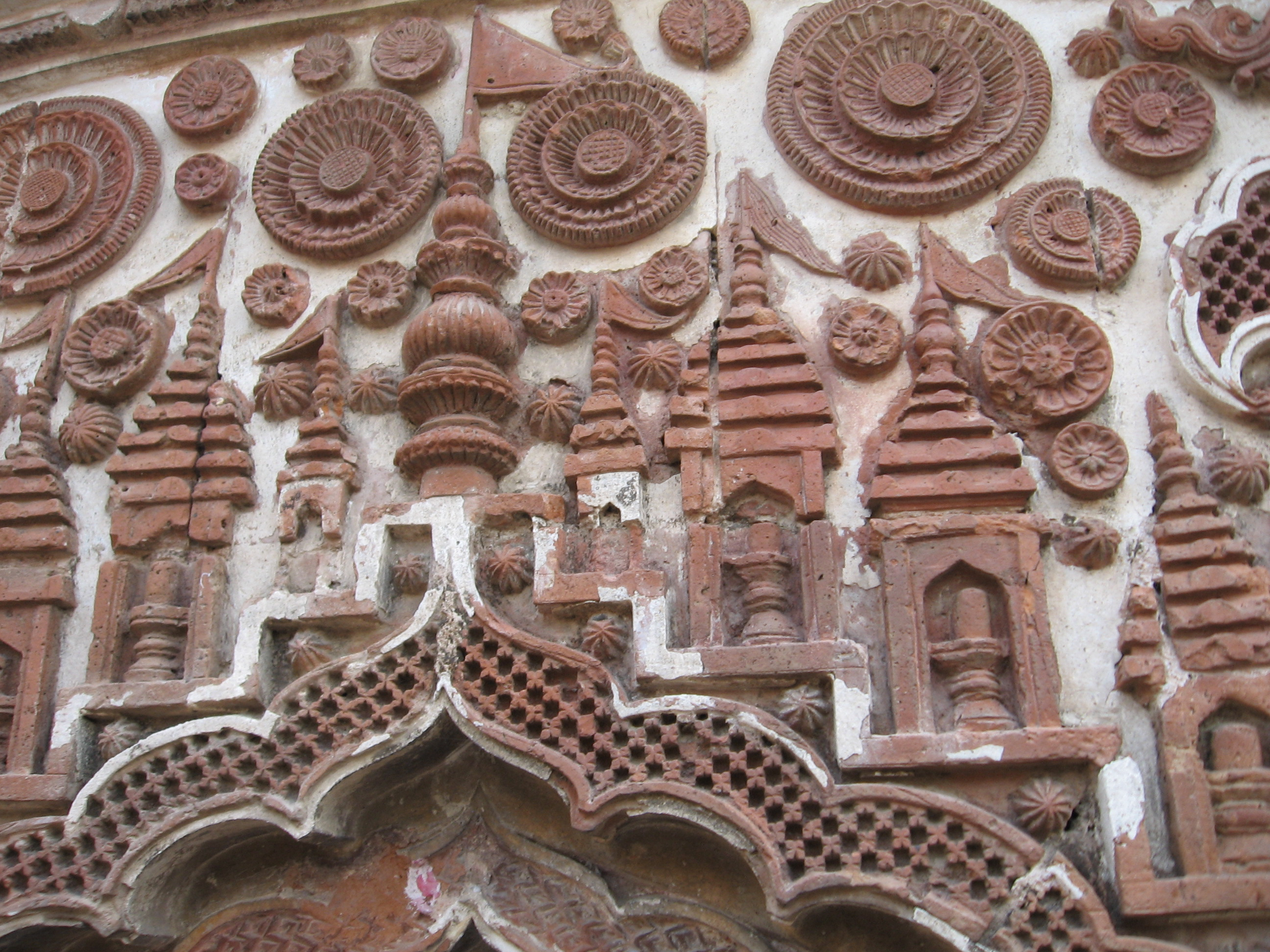
- Terracotta carvings on a Nanoor temple wall

- Location in West Bengal
- Coordinates: 23°43′N 87°52′E
- Country: India
- State: West Bengal
- District: Birbhum
- Parliamentary constituency: Bolpur
- Assembly constituency: Nanoor

Area
  - Total: 311.83 km^{2} (120.40 sq mi)

Population (2011)
  - Total: 218,654
  - Density: 701.20/km^{2} (1,816.1/sq mi)
- Time zone: UTC+5.30 (IST)
- PIN: 731301
- Area code: 03463
- Literacy Rate: 69.45 per cent
- Website: http://103.249.37.130//

Nanoor is a community development block that forms an administrative division in Bolpur subdivision of Birbhum district in the Indian state of West Bengal.

== Overview ==
Birbhum district is physiographically a part of the ancient Rarh region. The western portion of the district is basically an extension of the Chota Nagpur Plateau. The area has mostly loose reddish lateritic low fertility soil. In the east, the flood plains of the major rivers, such as the Ajay, Bakreshwar, Mayurakshi and Brahmani, have soft alluvial soil. The forest cover is only 3.5% of the total district. Although coal is found in the district and Bakreshwar Thermal Power Station has a capacity of 2,010 MW, the economic condition of Birbhum is dominated by agriculture. From 1977 onwards majorland reforms took place in West Bengal. Land in excess of land ceiling was acquired and distributed amongst the peasants. In Birbhum district, 19,968 hectares of vested agricultural land has been distributed amongst 161,515 beneficiaries, till 2011. However, more than 38% of the operational land holding is marginal or less than 1 acre. The proportion of agricultural labourers amongst total workers in Birbhum district is 45.9%, the highest amongst all districts of West Bengal. Culturally rich Birbhum, with such traditional landmarks as Jaydev Kenduli and Chandidas Nanoor, is home to Visva-Bharati University at Santiniketan, having close association with two Nobel laureates – Rabindranath Tagore and Amartya Sen.

== Geography ==
Map of Birbhum district showing CD blocks and municipal areas. Click on the map to view larger map.

Nanoor is located at 23°43′N 87°52′E.

Nanoor CD Block is part of the Suri-Bolpur Plain, one of the four sub-micro physiographic regions of Birbhum district. It covers the interfluves of the Mayurakshi and Ajay rivers, in the south-eastern part of the district. This area exhibits somewhat upland topography sloping from north-west to south-east.

Nanoor CD Block is bounded by Labpur CD Block on the north, Ketugram I and Mongalkote CD Block, in Purba Bardhaman district, on the east and south, and Bolpur Sriniketan CD Block on the west. On the south Mangalkote CD Block is across the Ajay.

Nanoor CD Block has an area of 311.83 km^{2}. It has 1 panchayat samity, 11 gram panchayats, 120 gram sansads (village councils), 137 mouzas and 131 inhabited villages, as per District Statistical Handbook Birbhum 2008.Nanoor police station serves this block. Headquarters of this CD Block is at Nanoor.

Gram panchayats of Nanoor block/panchayat Samiti are: Bara-Saota, Chandidas-Nanoor, Charkalgram, Daskalgram-Kareya I, Daskalgram-Kareya II, Jalundi, Kirnahar I, Kirnahar II, Nowanagar Kodda, Thupsar and Uchkaran.

== History ==
=== Chandidas ===
Nanoor is the birthplace of 14th century lyric poet Chandidas of Vaishnava Padavali fame.

=== Nanoor massacre ===
In the Nanoor massacre, 11 farmers owing allegiance to Trinamool Congress were killed at Suchpur, Nanoor, on 27 July 2000. In 2010, a Suri court sentenced 44 people to life imprisonment in the case. It included 4 CPI (M) members (including a Zonal Committee member) and 40 party supporters. According to press reports, it was the first time that so many people were given punishment in a single case in West Bengal. Press reports further said that the clash was over the right to cultivate a 4-bigha plot. The hacking to death of 11 farmers, also happen to be the biggest toll in a political clash in West Bengal in recent memory.

The Hindu wrote, “On a long term, the killings, symbolising the birth of a new theatre of violence after Keshpur in district Midnapore - where deaths and maiming in political clashes have become a bizarre routine - constitute an extremely disturbing augury for the society in Bengal.

== Demographics ==
=== Population ===
As per the 2011 Census of India, Nanoor CD Block had a total population of 218,654, of which 213,387 were rural and 5,267 were urban. There were 112,185 (51%) males and 106,469 (49%) females. Population below 6 years was 26,040. Scheduled Castes numbered 71,153 (32.54%) and Scheduled Tribes numbered 5,221 (2.39%).

As per 2011 census, Nanoor block had a total population of 218,543, out of which 111,974 were males and 106,569 were females. Nanoor Block registered a population growth of 11.30 per cent during the 1991-2001 decade. Decadal growth for Birbhum district was 17.88 per cent. Decadal growth in West Bengal was 17.84 per cent.

Census Town in Nanoor CD Block is (2011 census figures in brackets): Parota (5,267).

Large villages (with 4,000+ population) in Nanoor CD Block are (2011 census figures in brackets): Daskalgram (4,377), Kirnahar (7,103), Papuri (5,148), Charkalgram (5,344), Chandidas Nanoor (8,399), Baliguni (4,039), Sajnor (4,274) and Brahmankhanda (5,842).

Other villages in Nanoor CD Block include (2011 census figures in brackets): Pakurhans (3,999), Thupsara (3,419), Nawanagar (1,438), Uchkaran (3,486), Bara (2,448), Saota (3,704), Karea (2,349), Jalandi (2,433), Kadda (704).

=== Literacy ===
As per the 2011 census the total number of literates in Nanoor CD Block was 133,769 (69.45% of the population over 6 years) out of which males numbered 74,095 (74.87% of the male population over 6 years) and females numbered 59,674 (63.72% of the female population over 6 years). The gender disparity (the difference between female and male literacy rates) was 11.56%.

See also – List of West Bengal districts ranked by literacy rate

Literacy in CD blocks of
Birbhum district
Rampurhat subdivision
Murarai I – 55.67%
Murarai II – 58.28%
Nalhati I – 69.83%
Nalhati II – 71.68%
Rampurhat I – 73.29%
Rampurhat II – 70.77%
Mayureswar I – 71.52%
Mayureswar II – 70.89%
Suri Sadar subdivision
Mohammad Bazar – 65.18%
Rajnagar – 68.10%
Suri I – 72.75%
Suri II – 72.75%
Sainthia – 72.33%
Dubrajpur – 68.26%
Khoyrasol – 68.75%
Bolpur subdivision
Bolpur Sriniketan – 70.67%
Ilambazar – 74.27%
Labpur – 71.20%
Nanoor – 69.45%
2011 Census: CD Block Wise

Primary Census Abstract Data

=== Language and religion ===
Religion in Nanoor CD block (2011)
Hinduism	64.71%
Islam	34.97%
Other or not stated	0.32%

In the 2011 census, Hindus numbered 141,490 and formed 64.71% of the population in Nanoor CD Block. Muslims numbered 76,457 and formed 34.97% of the population. Christians numbered 443 and formed 0.20% of the population. Others numbered 264 and formed 0.12% of the population.

The proportion of Hindus in Birbhum district has declined from 72.2% in 1961 to 62.3% in 2011. The proportion of Muslims in Birbhum district has increased from 27.6% to 37.1% during the same period. Christians formed 0.3% in 2011.

Languages in Nanoor CD block (2011)
1. Bengali (98.2%)
2. Santali (1.77%)
3. Others (0.08%)

At the time of the 2011 census, 98.15% of the population spoke Bengali and 1.77% Santali as their first language.

== Rural poverty ==
As per the BPL household survey carried out in 2005, the proportion of BPL households in Nanoor CD Block was 34.7%, against 42.3% in Birbhum district. In six CD Blocks – Murarai II, Nalhati II, Rampurhat II, Rampurhat I, Suri II and Murarai I – the proportion of BPL families was more than 50%. In three CD Blocks – Rajnagar, Suri I and Labhpur – the proportion of BPL families was less than 30%. The other ten CD Blocks in Birbhum district were placed in between. According to the District Human Development Report, Birbhum, “Although there is no indication that the share of BPL households is more in blocks with higher share of agricultural labourer, there is a clear pattern that the share of BPL households is more in blocks with disadvantaged population in general and Muslim population in particular.” (The disadvantaged population includes SCs, STs and Muslims.)

== Economy ==
=== Livelihood ===
Livelihood
in Nanoor CD Block
1. Cultivators (24.7%)
2. Agricultural labourers (48.6%)
3. Household industries (3.36%)
4. Other Workers (23.3%)

In Nanoor CD Block in 2011, amongst the class of total workers, cultivators numbered 20,157 and formed 24.74%, agricultural labourers numbered 39,608 and formed 48.61%, household industry workers numbered 2,738 and formed 3.36% and other workers numbered 18,958 and formed 23.30%. Total workers numbered 81,488 and formed 37.27% of the total population, and non-workers numbered 137,166 and formed 62.73% of the population.

Note: In the census records a person is considered a cultivator, if the person is engaged in cultivation/ supervision of land owned by self/government/institution. When a person who works on another person's land for wages in cash or kind or share, is regarded as an agricultural labourer. Household industry is defined as an industry conducted by one or more members of the family within the household or village, and one that does not qualify for registration as a factory under the Factories Act. Other workers are persons engaged in some economic activity other than cultivators, agricultural labourers and household workers. It includes factory, mining, plantation, transport and office workers, those engaged in business and commerce, teacher s, entertainment artistes and so on.

=== Infrastructure ===
There are 130 inhabited villages in Nanoor CD Block, as per District Census Handbook, Birbhum, 2011. 100% villages have power supply. 129 villages (99.23%) have drinking water supply. 31 villages (23.85%) have post offices. 121 villages (93.08%) have telephones (including landlines, public call offices and mobile phones). 51 villages (39.23%) have pucca (paved) approach roads and 55 villages (42.31%) have transport communication (includes bus service, rail facility and navigable waterways). 9 villages (6.92%) have agricultural credit societies and 8 villages (6.15%) have banks.

=== Agriculture ===
Following land reforms land ownership pattern has undergone transformation. In 2004–05 (the agricultural labourer data is for 2001), persons engaged in agriculture in Nanoor CD Block could be classified as follows: bargadars 9,255 (15.53%), patta (document) holders 9.776 (16.41%), small farmers (possessing land between 1 and 2 hectares) 3,550 (5.96%), marginal farmers (possessing land up to 1 hectare) 8,360 (14.03%) and agricultural labourers 28,639 (48.07%).

Birbhum is a predominantly paddy cultivation-based agricultural district. The area under paddy cultivation in 2010-11 was 249,000 hectares of land. Paddy is grown in do, suna and sali classes of land. There is double to triple cropping system for paddy cultivation. Other crops grown in Birbhum are gram, masuri, peas, wheat, linseed, khesari, til, sugarcane and occasionally cotton. 192,470 hectares of cultivable land is under irrigation by different sources, such as canals, tanks, river lift irrigation and different types of tubewells. In 2009–10, 158,380 hectares were irrigated by canal water. There are such major irrigation projects as Mayurakshi and Hijli. Other rivers such as Ajoy, Brahmani, Kuskurni, Dwaraka, Hingla and Kopai are also helpful for irrigation in the district.

In 2013–14, there were 45 fertiliser depots, 6 seed stores and 25 fair price shops in Nanoor CD block.

In 2013–14, Nanoor CD block produced 75,113 tonnes of Aman paddy, the main winter crop, from 24,949 hectares, 2,182 tonnes of Aus paddy (summer crop) from 978 hectares, 24,377 tonnes of Boro paddy (spring crop) from 7,134 hectares, 3,721 tonnes of wheat from 1,448 hectares, 14,403 tonnes of potatoes from 832 hectares and 3,275 tonnes of sugar cane from 49 hectares. It also produced pulses and oilseeds.

In 2013–14, the total area irrigated in Nanoor CD block was 6,000 hectares, out of which 2,500 hectares were irrigated by canal water, 2,000 hectares by tank water, 100 hectares by river lift irrigation and 1,400 hectares by shallow tube wells.

=== Banking ===
In 2013–14, Nanoor CD block had offices of 9 commercial banks and 3 gramin banks.

=== Other sectors ===
According to the District Human Development Report, 2009, Birbhum is one of the most backward districts of West Bengal in terms of industrial development. Of the new industrial projects set-up in West Bengal between 1991 and 2005, only 1.23% came to Birbhum. Bakreshwar Thermal Power Station is the only large-scale industry in the district and employs about 5,000 people. There are 4 medium-scale industries and 4,748 registered small-scale industries.

The proportion of workers engaged in agriculture in Birbhum has been decreasing. According to the District Human Development Report, “more people are now engaged in non-agricultural activities, such as fishing, retail sales, vegetable vending, selling milk, and so on. As all these activities are at the lower end of the spectrum of marketable skills, it remains doubtful if these activities generate enough return for their family’s sustenance.”

=== Backward Regions Grant Fund ===
Birbhum district is listed as a backward region and receives financial support from the Backward Regions Grant Fund. The fund, created by the Government of India, is designed to redress regional imbalances in development. As of 2012, 272 districts across the country were listed under this scheme. The list includes 11 districts of West Bengal.

== Transport ==
Nanoor CD block has 8 originating/ terminating bus routes. The nearest railway station is 10 km from the CD block headquarters.

SH 6, running from Rajnagar (in Birbhum district) to Alampur (in Howrah district), passes through Nanoor CD Block.

== Culture ==
A fair is organized annually, on the occasion of dol purnima (full moon), on the bank of the Dontapukur at Nanoor in memory of Dwija Chandidas and Rajakini (washerwoman) Tami. It is called Chandidas Mela.

== Education ==
In 2013–14, Nanoor CD block had 159 primary schools with 12,606 students, 21 middle schools with 2,144 students, 16 high schools with 8,968 students and 10 higher secondary schools with 12,684 students. Nanoor CD Block had 1 general degree college with 2,345 students, 3 technical/ professional institutions with 249 students and 337 institutions for special and non-formal education with 11,900 students.

As per the 2011 census, in Nanoor CD Block, amongst the 130 inhabited villages, 4 villages did not have a school, 39 villages had more than 1 primary school, 45 villages had at least 1 primary and 1 middle school and 28 villages had at least 1 middle and 1 secondary school. 11 villages had senior secondary schools. There was 1 degree college for arts, science and commerce in Nanoor CD Block.

Chandidas Mahavidyalaya was established at Khujutipara in 1972.

== Healthcare ==
In 2014, Nanoor CD block had 1 rural hospital, 3 primary health centres and 1 private nursing home with total 48 beds and 7 doctors (excluding private bodies). It had 34 family welfare subcentres. 3,008 patients were treated indoor and 56,528 patients were treated outdoor in the hospitals, health centres and subcentres of the CD block.

As per 2011 census, in Nanoor CD Block, 6 villages had community health centres, 9 villages had primary health centres, 35 villages had primary health subcentres, 9 villages had maternity and child welfare centres, 8 villages had veterinary hospitals, 18 villages had medicine shops and out of the 130 inhabited villages 62 villages had no medical facilities.

Nanoor Rural Hospital at Nanoor has 30 beds. There are primary health centres at Banagram (PO Nanoor) (6 beds), Khujutipara (10 beds) and Kirnahar (10 beds).
