= Parota, Birbhum =

Parota
- Census Town
- Location in West Bengal Parota (India)
- Coordinates: 23.7790°N 87.8726°E
- Country: India
- State: West Bengal
- District: Birbhum

Area
  - Total: 1.4803 km^{2} (0.5715 sq mi)

Population (2011)
  - Total: 5,267
  - Density: 3,558/km^{2} (9,215/sq mi)

Languages
  - Official: Bengali, English
- Time zone: IST
- PIN: 731302
- Telephone code: 03463
- Lok Sabha constituency: Bolpur
- Vidhan Sabha constituency: Nanoor
- Website: birbhum.nic.in

Parota is a census town in Nanoor CD block in Bolpur subdivision of Birbhum district.

== Geography ==
Cities and towns in Bolpur subdivision of Birbhum district
M: municipal city/ town, CT: census town, R: rural/ urban centre, U: University.
Owing to space constraints in the small map, the actual locations in a larger map may vary slightly

=== Location ===
Parota is located at 23.7790°N 87.8726°E.

Note: The map alongside presents some of the notable locations in the area. All places marked in the map are linked in the larger full screen map.

Parota is located in the south-eastern corner of the district which is an alluvial plain between Ajay River and Mayurakshi River. It has hot and dry summers, spread over March – May, followed by the monsoon from June to September. 78 per cent of the rainfall occurs during this period.

== Demographics ==
As per the 2011 Census of India, Parota had a total population of 5,267 of which 2,960 (51%) were males and 2,577 (49%) were females. Population below 6 years was 487. The total number of literates in Parota was 4,148 (86.78% of the population over 6 years).

== Infrastructure ==
As per the District Census Handbook 2011, Parota covered an area of 1.4803 km^{2}. There is a railway station at Kirnahar nearby. Buses are available at Parota. It has 3 km roads and open drains. The major source of protected water supply is from bore well pumping and over head tank. There are 530 domestic electric connections. Amongst the medical facilities it has 2 medicine shops. Amongst the educational facilities it has are 2 primary schools, 1 middle school, 1 secondary school and 1 senior secondary school. Amongst the social, recreational and cultural facilities there are 1 auditorium/community hall at Kirnahar, 1 public library and 1 reading room. It has the branches of 2 nationalised banks and 1 agricultural credit society. Amongst the commodities it produces are bakery products.

== Culture ==
There is a well-known Parota Dramatic Club www.parotadramaticclub.org established in 1925. It was associated with the Bengali revolutionary activities. Now it has been registered under the West Bengal Society Registration Act XXVI of 1961 with Registration No. - S/IL/20250. It has its own building, playground, office, etc.

== Transport ==
A short stretch of local roads connect Parota to State Highway 6 at Kirnahar.
