= Dubrajpur (community development block) =

- Community development block
- Location in West Bengal
- Coordinates: 23°49′N 87°23′E
- Country: India
- State: West Bengal
- District: Birbhum
- Parliamentary constituency: Birbhum
- Assembly constituency: Dubrajpur, Suri

Area
  - Total: 344.88 km^{2} (133.16 sq mi)

Population (2011)
  - Total: 181,437
  - Density: 526.09/km^{2} (1,362.6/sq mi)
- Time zone: UTC+5.30 (IST)
- Literacy Rate: 68.26 per cent
- Website: http://birbhum.nic.in/

Dubrajpur is a community development block that forms an administrative division in Suri Sadar subdivision of Birbhum district in the Indian state of West Bengal.

== Overview ==
Birbhum district is physiographically a part of the ancient Rarh region. The western portion of the district is basically an extension of the Chota Nagpur Plateau. The area has mostly loose reddish lateritic low fertility soil. In the east, the flood plains of the major rivers, such as the Ajay, Bakreshwar, Mayurakshi and Brahmani, have soft alluvial soil. The forest cover is only 3.5% of the total district. Although coal is found in the district and Bakreshwar Thermal Power Station has a capacity of 2,010 MW, the economic condition of Birbhum is dominated by agriculture. From 1977 onwards majorland reforms took place in West Bengal. Land in excess of land ceiling was acquired and distributed amongst the peasants. In Birbhum district, 19,968 hectares of vested agricultural land has been distributed amongst 161,515 beneficiaries, till 2011. However, more than 38% of the operational land holding is marginal or less than 1 acre. The proportion of agricultural labourers amongst total workers in Birbhum district is 45.9%, the highest amongst all districts of West Bengal. Culturally rich Birbhum, with such traditional landmarks as Jaydev Kenduli and Chandidas Nanoor, is home to Visva-Bharati University at Santiniketan, having close association with two Nobel laureates – Rabindranath Tagore and Amartya Sen.

== Geography ==
Map of Birbhum district showing CD blocks and municipal areas. Click on the map to view larger map.

Dubrajpur is located at 23°49′N 87°23′E.

Dubrajpur CD Block is part of the Suri-Bolpur Plain, one of the four sub-micro physiographic regions of Birbhum district. It covers the interfluves of the Mayurakshi and Ajay rivers, in the south-eastern part of the district. This area exhibits somewhat upland topography sloping from north-west to south-east. Dubrajpur CD Block extends into the adjacent Bakreshwar Uplands.

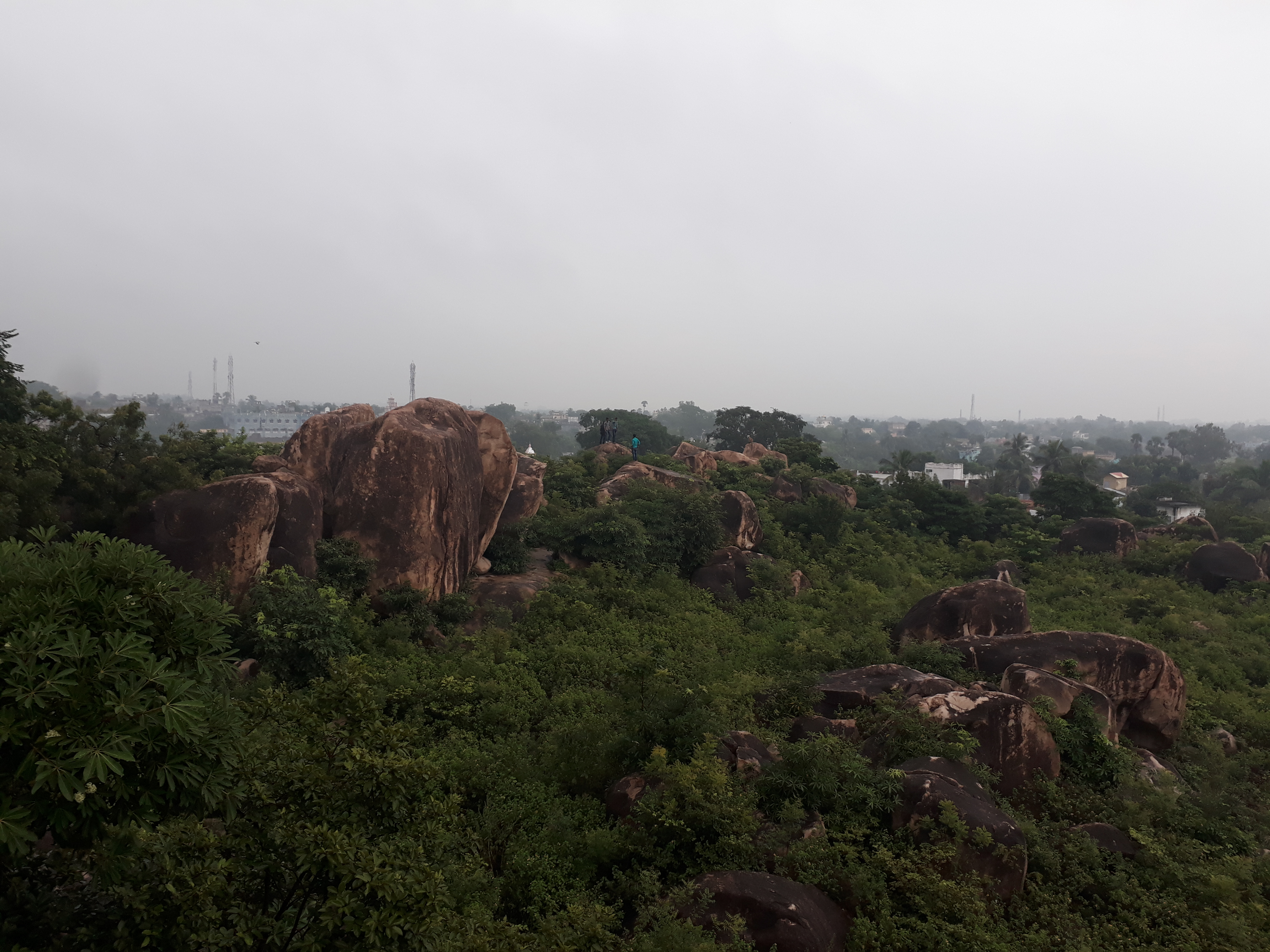
Mama Bhagne pahar

Near Dubrajpur town is the Mama Bhagne pahar. Many large sized rocks are found in the area. Two remarkable of these rocks are known as Mama and Bhagne (maternal uncle and nephew). Now, the entire area is known as Mama Bhagney.

Dubrajpur CD Block is bounded by Rajnagar and Suri I CD Blocks on the north, Suri II and Ilambazar CD Blocks on the east, Pandabeswar CD Block, in Paschim Bardhaman district, across the Ajay on the south and Khoyrasol CD Block on the west.

Dubrajpur CD Block has an area of 344.88 km^{2}. It has 1 panchayat samity, 10 gram panchayats, 104 gram sansads (village councils), 226 mouzas and 193 inhabited villages, as per District Statistical Handbook Birbhum 2008. Dubrajpur police station serves this block. Headquarters of this CD Block is at Dubrajpur.

Gram panchayats of Dubrajpur block/panchayat samiti are: Balijuri, Chinpai, Gohaliara, Hetampur, Jashpur, Lakshinarayanpur, Loba, Paduma, Parulia and Sahapur.

== Demographics ==
=== Population ===
As per the 2011 Census of India, Dubrajpur CD Block had a total population of 181,437, all of which were rural. There were 92,956 (51%) males and 88,481 (49%) females. Population below 6 years was 24,182. Scheduled Castes numbered 62,895 (34.66%) and Scheduled Tribes numbered 9,866 (5.44%).

As per 2001 census, Dubrajpur block had a total population of 158,968, out of which 81,346 were males and 77,622 were females. Dubrajpur block registered a population growth of 17.07 per cent during the 1991-2001 decade. Decadal growth for Birbhum district was 17.88 per cent. Decadal growth in West Bengal was 17.84 per cent.

Large villages (with 4,000+ population) in Dubrajpur CD Block are (2011 census figures in brackets): Sahapur (5,621).

Other villages in Dubrajpur CD Block include (2011 census figures in brackets): Parulia (495), Chinpai (2,760), Bakreshwar (1,741), Gohaliara (1,487), Hetampur (2,388), Jashpur (1,483), Paduma (1,140), Balijuri (1,913) and Lakshminarayanpur (728).

=== Literacy ===
As per the 2011 census the total number of literates in Dubrajpur CD Block was 107,340 (68.26% of the population over 6 years) out of which males numbered 61,460 (76.11% of the male population over 6 years) and females numbered 45,880 (59.96% of the female population over 6 years). The gender disparity (the difference between female and male literacy rates) was 16.14%.

See also – List of West Bengal districts ranked by literacy rate

Literacy in CD blocks of
Birbhum district
Rampurhat subdivision
Murarai I – 55.67%
Murarai II – 58.28%
Nalhati I – 69.83%
Nalhati II – 71.68%
Rampurhat I – 73.29%
Rampurhat II – 70.77%
Mayureswar I – 71.52%
Mayureswar II – 70.89%
Suri Sadar subdivision
Mohammad Bazar – 65.18%
Rajnagar – 68.10%
Suri I – 72.75%
Suri II – 72.75%
Sainthia – 72.33%
Dubrajpur – 68.26%
Khoyrasol – 68.75%
Bolpur subdivision
Bolpur Sriniketan – 70.67%
Ilambazar – 74.27%
Labpur – 71.20%
Nanoor – 69.45%
2011 Census: CD Block Wise

Primary Census Abstract Data

=== Language and religion ===
Religion in Dubrajpur CD block (2011)
Hinduism	66.52%
Islam	33.22%
Other or not stated	0.26%

In the 2011 census, Hindus numbered 120,697 and formed 66.52% of the population in Dubrajpur CD Block. Muslims numbered 60,280 and formed 33.22% of the population. Christians numbered 103 and formed 0.06% of the population. Others numbered 357 and formed 0.20% of the population.

The proportion of Hindus in Birbhum district has declined from 72.2% in 1961 to 62.3% in 2011. The proportion of Muslims in Birbhum district has increased from 27.6% to 37.1% during the same period. Christians formed 0.3% in 2011.

Languages in Dubrajpur CD block (2011)
1. Bengali (95.2%)
2. Santali (4.16%)
3. Others (0.59%)

At the time of the 2011 census, 95.25% of the population spoke Bengali and 4.16% Santali as their first language.

== Rural poverty ==
As per the BPL household survey carried out in 2005, the proportion of BPL households in Dubrajpur CD Block was 35.5%, against 42.3% in Birbhum district. In six CD Blocks – Murarai II, Nalhati II, Rampurhat II, Rampurhat I, Suri II and Murarai I – the proportion of BPL families was more than 50%. In three CD Blocks – Rajnagar, Suri I and Labhpur – the proportion of BPL families was less than 30%. The other ten CD Blocks in Birbhum district were placed in between. According to the District Human Development Report, Birbhum, “Although there is no indication that the share of BPL households is more in blocks with higher share of agricultural labourer, there is a clear pattern that the share of BPL households is more in blocks with disadvantaged population in general and Muslim population in particular.” (The disadvantaged population includes SCs, STs and Muslims.)

== Economy ==
=== Livelihood ===
Livelihood
in Dubrajpur CD Block
1. Cultivators (24.1%)
2. Agricultural labourers (50.0%)
3. Household industries (3.00%)
4. Other Workers (22.9%)

In Dubrajpur CD Block in 2011, amongst the class of total workers, cultivators numbered 17,124 and formed 24.6%, agricultural labourers numbered 35,603 and formed 50.03%, household industry workers numbered 2,136 and formed 3.00% and other workers numbered 16,300 and formed 22.91%. Total workers numbered 71,163 and formed 39.22% of the total population, and non-workers numbered 110,274 and formed 60.78% of the population.

Note: In the census records a person is considered a cultivator, if the person is engaged in cultivation/ supervision of land owned by self/government/institution. When a person who works on another person's land for wages in cash or kind or share, is regarded as an agricultural labourer. Household industry is defined as an industry conducted by one or more members of the family within the household or village, and one that does not qualify for registration as a factory under the Factories Act. Other workers are persons engaged in some economic activity other than cultivators, agricultural labourers and household workers. It includes factory, mining, plantation, transport and office workers, those engaged in business and commerce, teacher s, entertainment artistes and so on.

=== Infrastructure ===
There are 191 inhabited villages in Dubrajpur CD Block, as per District Census Handbook, Birbhum, 2011. Dubrajpur CD Block has the highest number of inhabited villages amongst all the CD Blocks in Birbhum district. 100% villages have power supply. 188 villages (98.43%) have drinking water supply. 37 villages (19.37%) have post offices. 171 villages (89.53%) have telephones (including landlines, public call offices and mobile phones). 58 villages (30.37%) have pucca (paved) approach roads and 75 villages (39.27%) have transport communication (includes bus service, rail facility and navigable waterways). 15 villages (7.85%) have agricultural credit societies and 11 villages (5.76%) have banks.

=== Agriculture ===
Following land reforms land ownership pattern has undergone transformation. In 2004-05 (the agricultural labourer data is for 2001), persons engaged in agriculture in Dubrajpur CD Block could be classified as follows: bargadars 14,931 (23.59%), patta (document) holders 10,563 (16.83%), small farmers (possessing land between 1 and 2 hectares) 3,894 (6.15%), marginal farmers (possessing land up to 1 hectare) 8,410 (13.28%) and agricultural labourers 25,419 (40.15%).

Birbhum is a predominantly paddy cultivation-based agricultural district. The area under paddy cultivation in 2010-11 was 249,000 hectares of land. Paddy is grown in do, suna and sali classes of land. There is double to triple cropping system for paddy cultivation. Other crops grown in Birbhum are gram, masuri, peas, wheat, linseed, khesari, til, sugarcane and occasionally cotton. 192,470 hectares of cultivable land is under irrigation by different sources, such as canals, tanks, river lift irrigation and different types of tubewells. In 2009-10, 158,380 hectares were irrigated by canal water. There are such major irrigation projects as Mayurakshi and Hijli. Other rivers such as Ajoy, Brahmani, Kuskurni, Dwaraka, Hingla and Kopai are also helpful for irrigation in the district.

In 2013-14, there were 54 fertiliser depots, 22 seed stores and 77 fair price shops in Dubrajpur CD block.

In 2013-14, Dubrajpur CD block produced 5,132 tonnes of Aman paddy, the main winter crop, from 1,903 hectares, 4,005 tonnes of wheat from 1,501 hectares, 46,659 tonnes of potatoes from 1,713 hectares and 4,890 tonnes of sugar cane from 60 hectares. It also produced pulses and oilseeds.

In 2013-14, the total area irrigated in Dubrajpur CD block was 11,003 hectares, out of which 5,488 hectares were irrigated by canal water, 1,150 hectares by tank water, 105 hectares by river lift irrigation, 3,135 hectares by deep tube wells and 1,125 hectares by shallow tube wells.

=== Banking ===
In 2013-14, Dubrajpur CD block had offices of 8 commercial banks and 4 gramin banks.

=== Coal ===
Khagra-Joydeb coal block, where a Supreme Court directive cancelled the original allotment to DVC, was given to DVC in a fresh allotment. With reserves of 103 million tonnes, the block will be in operation for about 30 years. In 2012 land protests had turned violent in Loba.

=== Power ===
The 1,005 MW Bakreshwar Thermal Power Station was commissioned between 1999 and 2009.

=== Other sectors ===
According to the District Human Development Report, 2009, Birbhum is one of the most backward districts of West Bengal in terms of industrial development. Of the new industrial projects set-up in West Bengal between 1991 and 2005, only 1.23% came to Birbhum. Bakreshwar Thermal Power Station is the only large-scale industry in the district and employs about 5,000 people. There are 4 medium-scale industries and 4,748 registered small-scale industries.

The proportion of workers engaged in agriculture in Birbhum has been decreasing. According to the District Human Development Report, “more people are now engaged in non-agricultural activities, such as fishing, retail sales, vegetable vending, selling milk, and so on. As all these activities are at the lower end of the spectrum of marketable skills, it remains doubtful if these activities generate enough return for their family’s sustenance.”

=== Backward Regions Grant Fund ===
Birbhum district is listed as a backward region and receives financial support from the Backward Regions Grant Fund. The fund, created by the Government of India, is designed to redress regional imbalances in development. As of 2012, 272 districts across the country were listed under this scheme. The list includes 11 districts of West Bengal.

== Transport ==
Dubrajpur CD block has 10 originating/ terminating bus routes.

The Andal-Sainthia branch line passes through this block. There are stations at Dubrajpur and Chinpai railway station.

NH 14, running from Morgram (in Murshidabad district) to Kharagpur (in Paschim Medinipur district) and SH 14, running from Dubrajpur to Betai (in Nadia district), pass through this block. Portions of these highways were earlier part of Panagarh-Morgram Highway.

== Culture ==
Bakreshwar is a Shakta pitha and a popular pilgrimage centre. It has eight hot springs. A fair is organised at Bakreswar on the eve of Siva Chaturdashi in the month of Falgun (February–March). The fair lasts for 8 days.

== Education ==
In 2013-14, Dubrajpur CD block had 143 primary schools with 11,263 students, 22 middle schools with 1,052 students, 11 high schools with 5,979 students and 5 higher secondary schools with 8,678 students. Dubrajpur CD Block had 1 general degree college with 2,609 students, 8 technical/ professional institutions with 1,120 students and 316 institutions for special and non-formal education with 12,655 students.

As per the 2011 census, in Dubrajpur CD Block, amongst the 191 inhabited villages, 34 villages did not have a school, 37 villages had more than 1 primary school, 45 villages had at least 1 primary and 1 middle school and 20 villages had at least 1 middle and 1 secondary school. 11 villages had senior secondary schools. There was 1 degree college for arts, science and commerce in Dubrajpur CD Block.

Krishna Chandra College was established at Hetampur in 1896.

== Healthcare ==
In 2014, Dubrajpur CD block had 1 hospital, 1 rural hospital, 4 primary health centres and 1 private nursing home with total 368 beds and 6 doctors (excluding private bodies). It had 30 family welfare subcentres. 8,876 patients were treated indoor and 84,566 patients were treated outdoor in the hospitals, health centres and subcentres of the CD block.

As per 2011 census, in Dubrajpur CD Block, 5 villages had community health centres, 6 villages had primary health centres, 37 villages had primary health subcentres, 21 villages had maternity and child welfare centres, 4 villages had veterinary hospitals, 7 villages had medicine shops and out of the 191 inhabited villages 108 villages had no medical facilities.

Dubrajpur Rural Hospital at PO Hetampur Rajbati has 30 beds. There are primary health centres at Balijuri (10 beds), Jashpur (PO Ghoratore) (6 beds), Jatra (6 beds) and Bakreshwar (6 beds).
