= Khujutipara =

- Village
- Location in West Bengal Khujutipara (India)
- Coordinates: 23.6109°N 87.8968°E
- Country: India
- State: West Bengal
- District: Birbhum

Population (2011)
  - Total: 2,595

Languages
  - Official: Bengali, English
- Time zone: IST
- Telephone code: 03462
- Lok Sabha constituency: Bolpur
- Vidhan Sabha constituency: Nanoor
- Website: birbhum.nic.in

Khujutipara is a village in Nanoor CD block in Bolpur subdivision of Birbhum district.

== Geography ==
Cities and towns in Bolpur subdivision of Birbhum district
M: municipal city/ town, CT: census town, R: rural/ urban centre, U: University.
Owing to space constraints in the small map, the actual locations in a larger map may vary slightly

=== Location ===
Khujutipara is located at 23.6109°N 87.8968°E.

Khujutipara is located in the south-eastern corner of the district which is an alluvial plain between Ajay River and Mayurakshi River. It has hot and dry summers, spread over March – May, followed by the monsoon from June to September. 78 per cent of the rainfall occurs during this period.

== Demographics ==
As per the 2011 Census of India, Khujutipara had a total population of 2,595 of which 1,342 (52%) were males and 1,253 (48%) were females. Population below 6 years was 280. The total number of literates in Khujutipara was 1,760 (76.03% of the population over 6 years).
