= Bolpur subdivision =

Bolpur Subdivision
- Subdivision
- Interactive map of Bolpur Subdivision
- Coordinates: 23.67°N 87.72°E
- Country: India
- State: West Bengal
- District: Birbhum
- Headquarters: Bolpur

Languages
  - Official: Bengali, English
- Time zone: UTC+5:30 (IST)
- ISO 3166 code: ISO 3166-2:IN
- Vehicle registration: WB
- Website: wb.gov.in

Bolpur Subdivision is an administrative subdivision of Birbhum district in the state of West Bengal, India.

== Overview ==
Bolpur subdivision is part of the Suri-Bolpur Plain, a sub-micro physiographic region. It covers the interfluves of the Mayurakshi and Ajay, in the south-eastern part of the district. This area exhibits somewhat upland topography sloping from north-west to south-east.

== Geography ==
=== Subdivisions ===
Birbhum district is divided into the following administrative subdivisions:

| Subdivision | Headquarters | Area km^{2} (2001) | Population (2011) | Rural population % (2011) | Urban population % (2011) |
|---|---|---|---|---|---|
| Rampurhat | Rampurhat | 1,574.23 | 1,508,506 | 96.62 | 3.38 |
| Suri Sadar | Suri | 1,782.72 | 1,121,871 | 96.57 | 3.43 |
| Bolpur | Bolpur | 1,186.66 | 872,027 | 96.56 | 3.44 |
| Birbhum district | | 4,545.00 | 3,502,404 | 96.59 | 3.41 |

=== Administrative units ===
Bolpur subdivision has 4 police stations, 4 community development blocks, 4 panchayat samitis, 40 gram panchayats, 621 mouzas, 579 inhabited villages, 1 municipality and 4 census towns. The municipality is: Bolpur. The census towns are: Ilambazar, Surul, Parota and Labhpur. The subdivision has its headquarters at Bolpur.

=== Police stations ===
Police stations in Bolpur subdivision have the following features and jurisdiction:

| Police station | Area covered km^{2} | Municipal town | CD Block |
|---|---|---|---|
| Bolpur | 333.6 | Bolpur | Bolpur Sriniketan |
| Bolpur Women | n/a | Bolpur | Bolpur Sriniketan |
| Santiniketan | n/a | Bolpur | Bolpur Sriniketan |
| Labhpur | 271.2 | - | Labpur |
| Nanoor | 309.2 | - | Nanoor |
| Ilambazar | 259.5 | - | Ilambazar |

=== Blocks ===
Community development blocks in Bolpur subdivision are:

| CD Block | Headquarters | Area km^{2} (2001) | Population (2011) | SC % | ST % | Hindus % | Muslims % | Literacy rate % | Census Towns |
|---|---|---|---|---|---|---|---|---|---|
| Labpur | Labhpur | 267.98 | 201,901 | 30.53 | 4.71 | 69.24 | 30.54 | 71.20 | 1 |
| Nanoor | Nanoor | 311.83 | 218,654 | 32.54 | 2.39 | 64.71 | 34.97 | 69.45 | 1 |
| Bolpur Sriniketan | Sriniketan | 334.58 | 202,553 | 30.59 | 19.06 | 73.92 | 25.45 | 70.67 | 1 |
| Ilambazar | Ilambazar | 261.54 | 168,709 | 23.63 | 8.94 | 51.67 | 47.41 | 74.27 | 1 |

=== Gram panchayats ===
The subdivision contains 40 gram panchayats under 4 community development blocks:

- Bolpur Sriniketan block consists of nine gram panchayats, viz. Bahiri–Panchshowa, Raipur–Supur, Sarpalehana–Albandha, Singhee, Kankalitala, Ruppur, Kasba, Sattor and Sian Muluk.
- Ilambazar block consists of nine gram panchayats, viz. Batikar, Ghurisha, Mongoldihi, Belati, Illambazar, Nanasole, Dharampur, Joydev–Kenduli and Sirsha.
- Labpur block consists of 11 gram panchayats, viz. Bipratikuri, Dwaraka, Jamna, Labpur–II, Chauhatta–Mahodari–I, Hatia, Kurunnahar, Thiba, Chauhatta & Mahodari –II, Indus and Labpur.
- Nanoor block consists of 11 gram panchayats, viz. Bara Saota, Daskalgram–Kareya–I, Chandidas Nanoor, Daskalgram–Kareya–II, Kirnahar–II, Kirnahar–I, Thupsara, Uchkaran, Charkalgram, Jalundi and Nawanagar Kadda.

== Education ==
Birbhum district had a literacy rate of 70.68% as per the provisional figures of the census of 2011. Rampurhat subdivision had a literacy rate of 69.12%, Suri Sadar subdivision 71.16% and Bolpur subdivision 72.71%.

Given in the table below is a comprehensive picture of the education scenario in Birbhum district, with data for the year 2013-14:

| Subdivision | Primary School | | Middle School | | High School | | Higher Secondary School | | General College, Univ | | Technical / Professional Instt | | Non-formal Education | |
| Subdivision | Institution | Student | Institution | Student | Institution | Student | Institution | Student | Institution | Student | Institution | Student | Institution | Student |
|---|---|---|---|---|---|---|---|---|---|---|---|---|---|---|
| Rampurhat | 889 | 99,767 | 132 | 9,487 | 82 | 68,462 | 65 | 85,685 | 7 | 16,963 | 24 | 3,448 | 2,291 | 99,407 |
| Suri Sadar | 912 | 71,882 | 90 | 5,188 | 72 | 40,161 | 56 | 69,109 | 6 | 13,912 | 35 | 7,620 | 1,961 | 58,469 |
| Bolpur | 628 | 48,314 | 64 | 5,859 | 53 | 31,266 | 49 | 60,139 | 6 | 17,379 | 20 | 3,424 | 1,333 | 43,805 |
| Birbhum district | 2,429 | 219,263 | 286 | 20,534 | 207 | 139,889 | 170 | 214,925 | 19 | 48,254 | 79 | 14,492 | 5,585 | 201,681 |

The following institutions are located in Bolpur subdivision:

- Visva-Bharati was founded by Rabindranath Tagore at Santiniketan in 1921. It was declared a central university and an “institution of national importance” in 1951.
- Bolpur College was established at Bolpur in 1950.
- Purni Devi Chaudhuri Girls' College was established at Bolpur in 2004.
- Bengal Institute of Technology & Management (BITM), a private engineering college on Santiniketan-Sriniketan Bypass, PO Dwaranda, was established in 2001.
- Santiniketan Institute of Polytechnic (SIP), a polytechnic college on Tatarpur, Muluk, Bolpur-Santiniketan, Birbhum, was established in 2010.
- Sambhunath College was established at Labhpur in 1963.
- Chandidas Mahavidyalaya was established at Khujutipara in 1972.
- Kabi Joydeb Mahavidyalaya was established at Ilambazar in 2007.

== Healthcare ==
Medical facilities in Bolpur subdivision are as follows:

Hospitals: (Name, location, beds)
Bolpur Subdivisional Hospital, Bolpur, well known as Sian Hospital, 125 beds
Pearson Memorial Hospital, Santiniketan, 50 beds

Rural Hospitals: (Name, CD Block, location, beds)
Labpur Rural Hospital, Labpur CD Block, Labhpur, 30 beds
Nanoor Rural Hospital, Nanoor CD Block, Nanoor, 30 beds
Ilambazar Rural Hospital, Ilambazar CD Block, Ilambazar, 30 beds

Block Primary Health Centres: (Name, CD Block, location, beds)
Bolpur Block Primary Health Centre, Bolpur Sriniketan CD Block, Bolpur, 60 beds

Primary Health Centres: (CD Block-wise)(CD Block, PHC location, beds)
Bolpur Sriniketan CD Block: Panchsowa (6), Sattore Kasba (PO Sattore) (10), Supur (PO Rajatpur) (10)
Labpur CD Block: Bipratikuri (6), Dwaraka (6), Ramkrishnapur (PO Brahamanigram) (6), Thiba (10), Abhadanga (6)
Nanoor CD Block: Banagram (PO Nanoor) (6), Khujutipara (10), Kirnahar (10)
Ilambazar CD Block: Batikar (10), Jaydev Kenduli (6)

== Electoral constituencies ==
Lok Sabha (parliamentary) and Vidhan Sabha (state assembly) constituencies in Bolpur subdivision were as follows:

| Lok Sabha constituency | Reservation | Vidhan Sabha constituency | Reservation | CD Block and/or Gram panchayats and/or municipal areas |
|---|---|---|---|---|
| Bolpur | SC | Labpur | None | Labpur CD Block, and Ahmedpur, Amarpur, Bhromorkol, Panrui, Sangra and Sreenidhipur GPs of Sainthia CD Block |
| - | - | Nanoor | SC | Nanoor CD Block, and Bahiri Panchshowa, Kankalitala, Kasba, Sarpalehana Albandha, Sian Muluk and Singhee GPs of Bolpur Sriniketan CD Block |
| - | - | Bolpur | None | Bolpur municipality, Ilambazar CD Block and Raipur Supur, Ruppur and Sattor GPs of Bolpur Sriniketan CD Block |
| - | - | All other Vidhan Sabha segments outside Bolpur subdivision | - | |
