= Kirnahar =

Kirnahar(Sankha)
- Village
- Location within West Bengal
- Coordinates: 23.7630377°N 87.8776320°E
- Country: India
- State: West Bengal
- District: Birbhum

Government
  - Body: Gram panchayat
- Elevation: 29 m (95 ft)

Population (2011)
  - Total: 7,103

Languages
  - Official: Bengali, English
- Time zone: UTC+5:30 (IST)
- PIN: 731302
- Telephone/STD code: 91 3463
- ISO 3166 code: IN-WB
- Lok Sabha constituency: Bolpur
- Vidhan Sabha constituency: Nanoor
- Website: birbhum.nic.in

Kirnahar is a village in Nanoor CD block in Bolpur subdivision of Birbhum district in the Indian state of West Bengal.

== Administration ==
Kirnahar I & II are village panchayats (local self-government) under Nanoor Panchayat Samity of Birbum Zilla Parishad. A police station, since 2022, is located at Kirnahar.

== Geography ==
Cities and towns in Bolpur subdivision of Birbhum district
M: municipal city/ town, CT: census town, R: rural/ urban centre, U: University.
Owing to space constraints in the small map, the actual locations in a larger map may vary slightly

=== Location ===
Kirnahar is located at 23.75°N 87.87°E. It has an average elevation of 29 m (95 ft).

Kirnahar is located in the south-eastern corner of the district which is an alluvial plain between Ajay River and Mayurakshi River. It has hot and dry summers, spread over March – May, followed by the monsoon from June to September. 78 per cent of the rainfall occurs during this period.

== Healthcare ==
There is a primary health centre at Kirnahar (with 10 beds).

== Education ==
Kirnahar has two higher secondary schools. They are:

- Kirnahar Shib Chandra High School
- Kirnahar Tarapado Memorial Girls High School

The first one is one of the oldest schools in Birbhum (Estd. 1895). It was established on the land donated by the local Sarkar zamindar Pioneere Babu Shib Chand Sarkar. His three sons established Shib Chandra High School in 1895. The school produced many great personalities who made their marks in political, cultural and scientific world.

There are 9 government-aided primary schools:

- Kirnahar Junior Basic School
- Uttar Kirnahar Primary School
- Kirnahar Nabin Chandra Smriti Primary School
- Kirnahar Laxmimata Primary School
- Parota Primary School
- Maheshgram Primary School
- Nimrha Primary School
- Sankha's School
- Kirnahar Nimna Buniyadi Vidhyalay (Near Bhadra Kalimata Mandir)

Kirnahar has one government sponsored library — Kirnahar Rabindra Smriti Samity Town Library. The library was established on 17 August 1941 (32nd Shravana, 1348 B.S.) just ten days after the demise of the notable poet/polymath Rabindranath Tagore. The founder-secretary was Krishnagopal Chandra. In 1957 it became sponsored by the West Bengal Government. Satyaranjan Sengupta was the first employed librarian. It was upgraded to a Town Library in 1986. During 2015, the library possessed over 15,000 books and had over 1,400 members.

== Notable residents ==
- Pranab Mukherjee, former President of India, was born at Mirati, Kirnahar

== Transport ==
Kirnahar railway station is midway station on the 52 km Ahmedpur Katwa Railway. It is well-connected by bus routes with Sainthia, Bolpur, Ahmedpur, Suri, Mallarpur and Rampurhat of this district and also with different places of the adjacent districts of Murshidabad and Burdwan. Three buses also run to Kolkata from this little town at 5:15 am, 6:00 am and 6:10 am.
