= Khustigiri =

- Village
- Location in West Bengal, India Khustigiri (India)
- Coordinates: 23.7605°N 87.536367°E
- Country: India
- State: West Bengal
- District: Birbhum

Government
  - Body: Gram panchayat

Languages
  - Official: Bengali, English
- Time zone: UTC+5:30 (IST)
- ISO 3166 code: IN-WB
- Vehicle registration: WB
- Website: wb.gov.in

Khustigiri (mentioned in census data as Khushtikuri) is a village in Ilambazar community development block in Bolpur subdivision of Birbhum District in the Indian state of West Bengal. It is 25 kilometres (16 mi) from Suri.

== Overview ==
Khustigiri is famous for the Dargah Sharif which is believed to be a place of learning, getting peace of mind, and becoming free from diseases and mental distress. This sacred place was established by the great Sufi saint Syed Shah Abdullah Kermani about 500 years ago for providing service to mankind, by the order of his spiritual master, Makhdoom Shah Arzani. The Sufi saint Abdullah Kermani (in short Kermani Baba) had established khankah, Jama Masjid, madrasah, langor khana, atithi shala, nahabat khana, library, charitable dispensary etc. for the service to mankind. In addition to these, the attractions of this place are the big and beautiful tomb of Kermani with double domes, sacred Gangagore, khas mahal, tombs of 14 Kazis, Hazrat Museum, historical tamarind tree, big dias, new minar, beautiful garden and the mazars of the descendants of Kermani. Several functions and ceremonies are held throughout the year. Many centres under this dargah are being opened in various parts of West Bengal.

== History ==
It is said that a Muslim saint Saiyad Shah Abdullah Kirmani when young left Kirman in Iran his native country and visited a Muslim saint Shah Arzani, who died at Patna during the reign of Shah Jahan in 1630 AD. Shah Arzani directed him to go to Bengal and gave him a toothpick of chambeli wood. He told him to stay at the place where the toothpick became fresh and green. He arrived in Birbum and stayed at Bargaon, where he performed several miracles (karamat) but the toothpick remained unchanged. He then moved on to Khustigiri. There one morning he found the toothpick to have become fresh and green. He planted it and it soon became a large tree. Shah Abdullah is specially renowned for his power over serpents. His dargah is in the hands of his descendants and is visited by numerous pilgrims.

== Geography ==
Cities and towns in Bolpur subdivision of Birbhum district
M: municipal city/ town, CT: census town, R: rural/ urban centre, U: University.
Owing to space constraints in the small map, the actual locations in a larger map may vary slightly

=== Location ===
Khustigiri is located at 23.7605°N 87.536367°E.

Note: The map alongside presents some of the notable locations in the area. All places marked in the map are linked in the larger full screen map.

== Fair ==
Medini mela is organised around the time of Muharram and Shab e Baraat near the mazar of Shah Abdullah Kermani at Khustigiri. Above all urs is observed every year from 11th Falgun to 15th Falgun (24 to 28 February) every year where millions of people attend.

== Demographics ==
As per the 2011 Census of India, Khushtikuri had a total population of 1,994 of which 1,039 (52%) were males and 955 (48%) were females. Population below 6 years was 294. The total number of literates in Khushtikuri was 1,243 (73.12% of the population over 6 years).

== Transport ==
Khustigiri is on the Panrui-Kurmitha Road.
