= Nanoor =

- Village
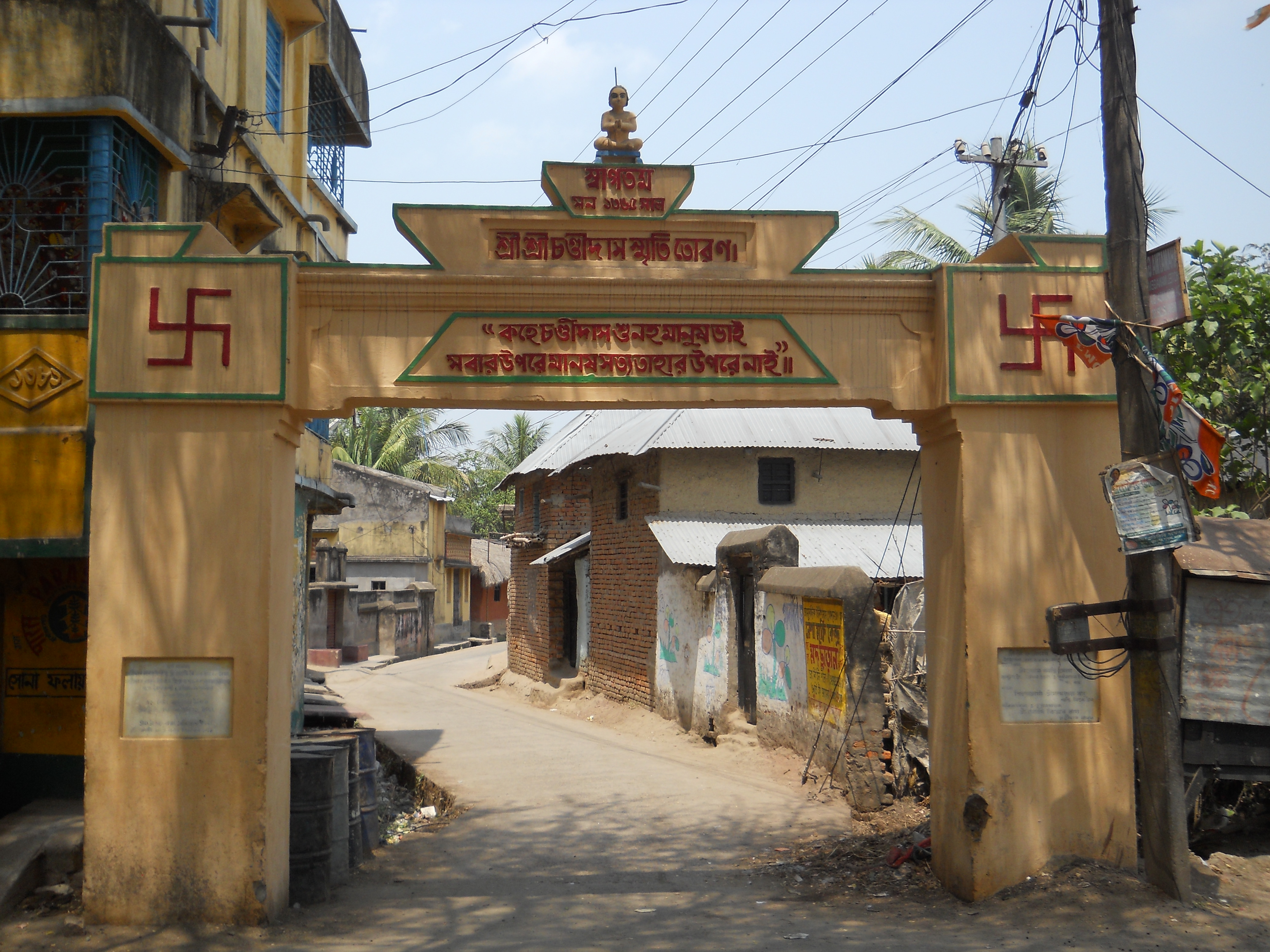
- Way to Chandidas bhita at Nanoor

- Location in West Bengal, India Nanoor (India)
- Coordinates: 23.70°N 87.86°E
- Country: India
- State: West Bengal
- District: Birbhum

Government
  - MLA: Bidhan Majhi
- Elevation: 24 m (79 ft)

Population (2011)
  - Total: 8,311

Languages
  - Official: Bengali, English
- Time zone: UTC+5:30 (IST)
- PIN: 731301
- Telephone/STD code: 91 3463
- Sex ratio: 958 ♂/♀
- Lok Sabha constituency: Bolpur
- Vidhan Sabha constituency: Nanoor
- Website: birbhum.nic.in

Nanoor (also spelt Nanur, called Chandidas Nanoor), is a village in Nanoor CD block in Bolpur subdivision of Birbhum district in West Bengal. Nanoor is the birthplace of 14th century lyric poet Chandidas of Vaishnava Padavali fame. It is developing as a craft centre with NGO support. With the massacres in 2000, Nanoor was in intense media focus.

== History ==
=== Archaeological finds ===
The archaeological department of Calcutta University organised an excavation programme in Nanoor in 1932 and 1957 but nothing much has happened since then. The archaeological discoveries at Jalundi village in Nanoor block in 2007 are believed to be the ruins of the ancient Pala or Sen dynasties.

=== Chandidas ===
According to the historian Binoy Ghosh, there were at least three poets associated with the name of Chandidas. They were identified as ‘Baru’, ‘Dwija’ and ‘Din’. Baru Chandidas possibly belonged to Chhatna in Bankura district and he composed Srikrishnakirtan. Not much is known about Din Chandidas, except that he also composed on the life of Sri Krishna. Dwija Chandidas possibly belonged to Nanoor and composed lyrically rich creations initiating the finest traditions of Bengali padavali (gathering of songs). The Nanoor-Kirnahar area is full of folk-myths about Chandidas – the story of his love for a washer woman, the story of his religious devotion and music and the story of his death.

The temple of Bisalakhi or Bagisree (more popular as Basuli) is believed to have been the centre of the devotional activity of Chandidas. The place at Nanoor where the Basuli temple (see pic lower down on this page) now stands and the surrounding area resembling a mound is called Chandibhita (see pic in the infobox). An effort was made by the University of Calcutta to understand what is there in the mound by excavating a small section of it. In the “Excavations at Nanoor by K.G.Goswami, March 1950”, the report says that in the mound, with a radius of around 550 feet and height of 17 feet, there are five occupational levels. The lowest of these levels belong to the Gupta era. At another place in Nanoor, some coins of the Gupta era were recovered. During and prior to the Gupta era, Buddhism had a strong hold over Bengal and early tantric practices prevailed.

Chandidas lived about 500 years ago, just around or a little prior to the arrival of Muslims in Bengal. By then the poet Jaydeva had already composed the Gita Govinda (see map below for location of Jayadev Kenduli). It is natural that such an age could produce a tantric devoted to his goddess, who could indulge in composing Sahajiya lyrics and propagate the merits of humanism. His compositions were a possible source of inspiration for Sri Chaitanya (1486-1534).

There are claims that Chandidas originally belonged to Ketugram, in neighbouring Purba Bardhaman district, and later came to Nanoor.

== Geography ==
Cities and towns in Bolpur subdivision of Birbhum district
M: municipal city/ town, CT: census town, R: rural/ urban centre, U: University.
Owing to space constraints in the small map, the actual locations in a larger map may vary slightly

=== Location ===
Nanoor is located at 23.70°N 87.86°E. It has an average elevation of 24 metres (79 ft).

It is 47 km from Suri, 18 km from Bolpur/Santiniketan and 29 km from Ahmedpur.

Note: The map alongside presents some of the notable locations in the area. All places marked in the map are linked in the larger full screen map.

=== Physical features ===
As per historical records there have been at least 13 intensive droughts between the years 1799 and 1855. The drought of 1836-37 was particularly severe.

=== Police station ===
Nanoor police station has jurisdiction over Nanoor CD block.

=== CD block HQ ===
The headquarters of Nanoor CD block are located at Nanoor.

== Demographics ==
As per the 2011 Census of India, Chandidas Nanur had a total population of 8,399 of which 4,268 (51%) were males and 4,131 (49%) were females. Population below 6 years was 977. The total number of literates in Chandidas Nanur was 5,409 (72.88% of the population over 6 years).

== Nanoor massacre ==
On 27 July 2000, CPI(M) activists allegedly killed 11 landless agricultural labourers in Suchpur, near Nanoor and under Nanoor police station.

The prime witness to the Nanoor killings was injured in an attack allegedly by CPI-M activists.

The Nanoor area has continued to be turbulent. On the basis of a FIR (first information report) lodged with the police against CPI(M) men, the police made arrests and in August 2001 they submitted charge sheets against 82 accused. The trial started in 2000 and continued for eight years.

The session court delivered verdict on Nanoor Massacre case in 2010, when 44 persons were convicted and sentenced to Life Imprisonment. Out of the 44, four were CPI(M) members.

== Education ==
Nanoor Chandidas Memorial High School is a Bengali-medium co-educational institution established in 1937. It has arrangements for teaching from Class V to XII.

Chandidas Mahavidyalaya was established at Khujutipara in 1972.

== Culture ==
=== Temples ===
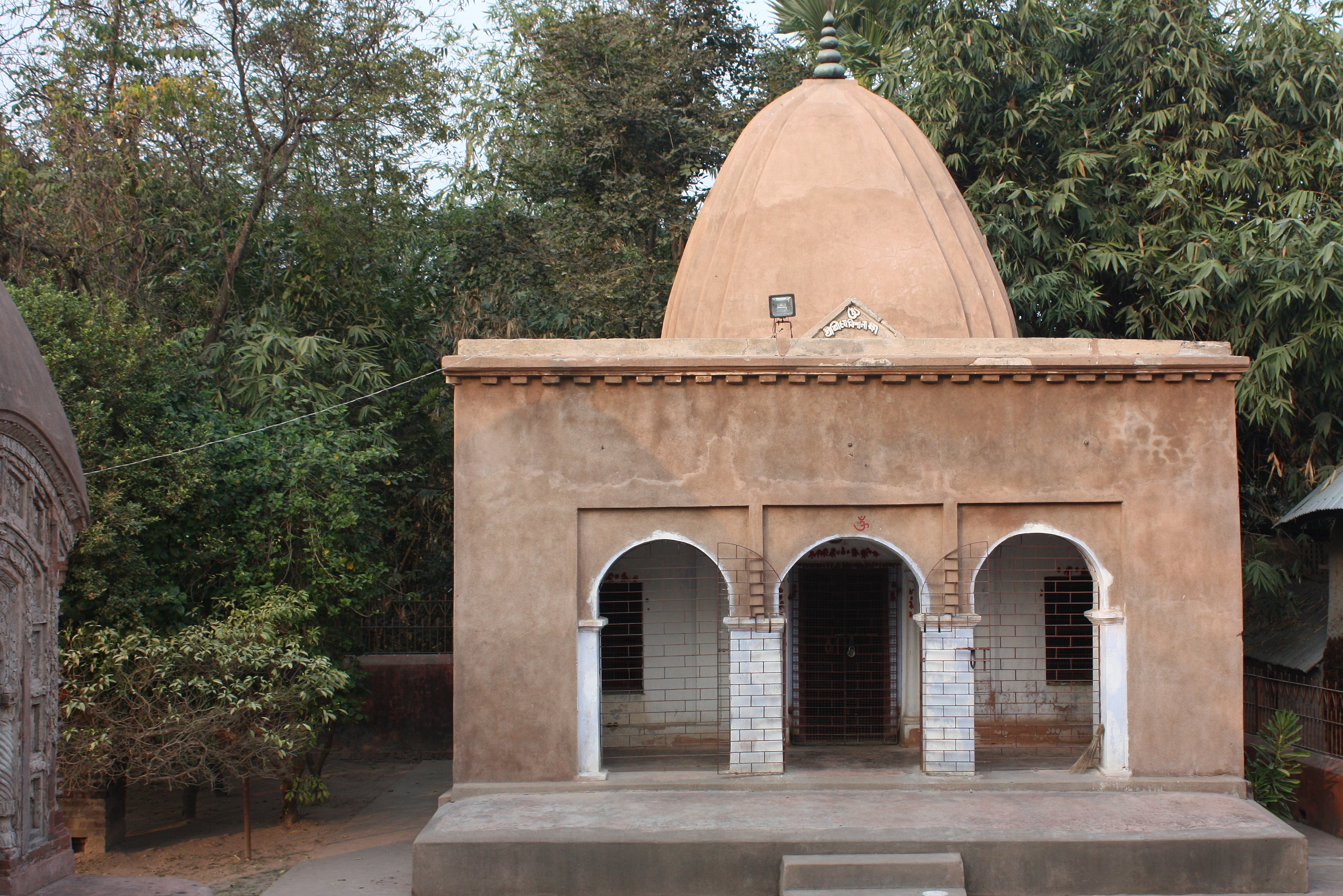
Bisalkshi temple

There is a temple dedicated to Devi Basuli at Nanoor. The Navaratna temple at Brahmandihi, Kirnahar Vadrokali Tala Temple, Parota Mahaprabhu Tala Temple and the Chand Roy temple and four Shiva temples at Uchkaran are amongst the temples under the protection of the state archaeological department. In 2001, the invaluable and rare black-stone Saraswati idol went missing from the Bishalakshmi temple.

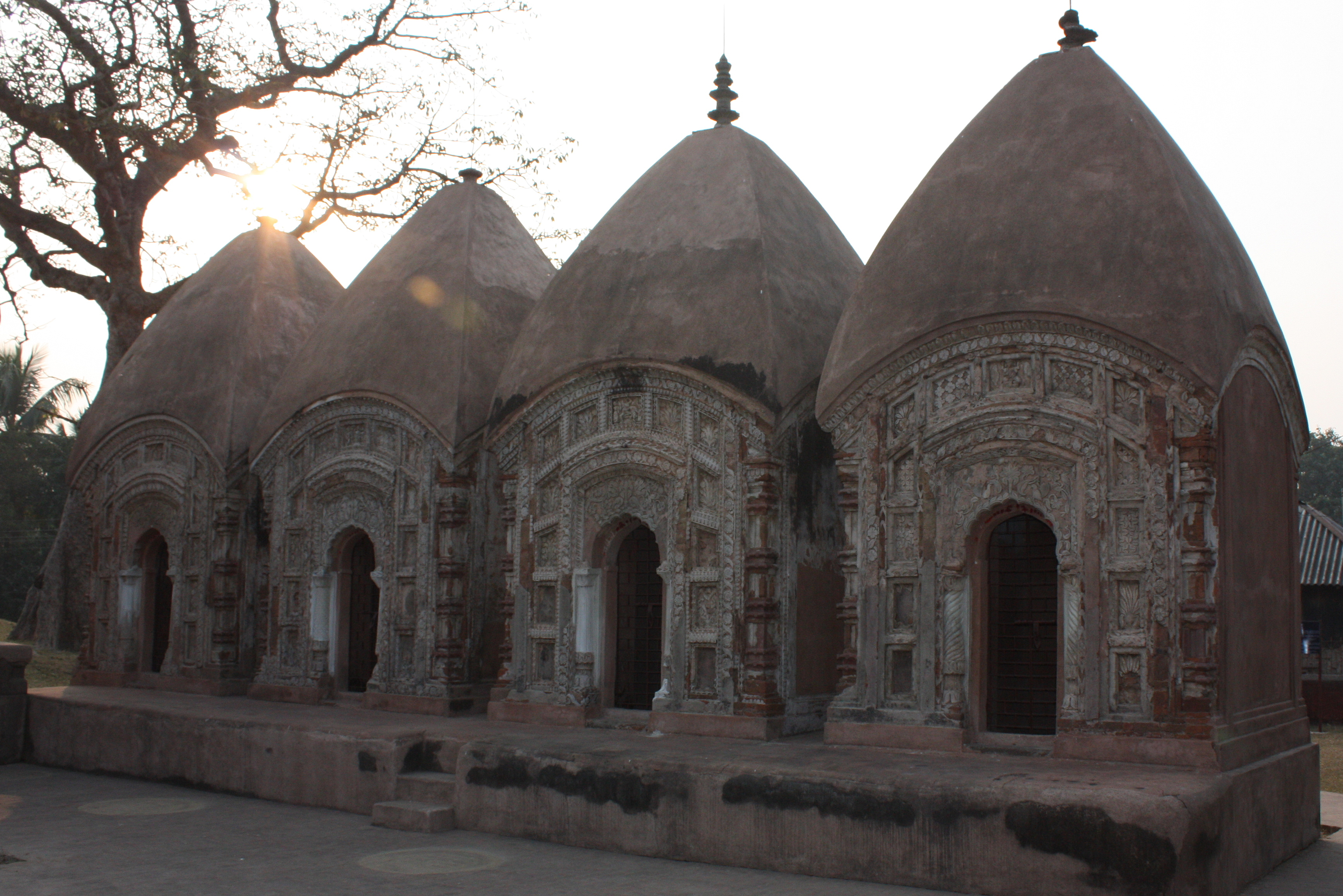
Nanoor temples

David J. McCutchion mentions several temples in the Nanoor area:
(1) the Shiva temple at Thupsara built in 1833 as a standard (small) tightly ridged early rekha deul of Birbhum-Bardhaman type with terracotta carvings on three sides,
(2) the Jora Shiva temples at Serandi built in 1830 as a late wide ridging (banded) rekha deul with terracotta carvings,
(3) the four Shiva temples at Uchkaron built in 1769 as standard small char chala structures with rich terracotta facades,

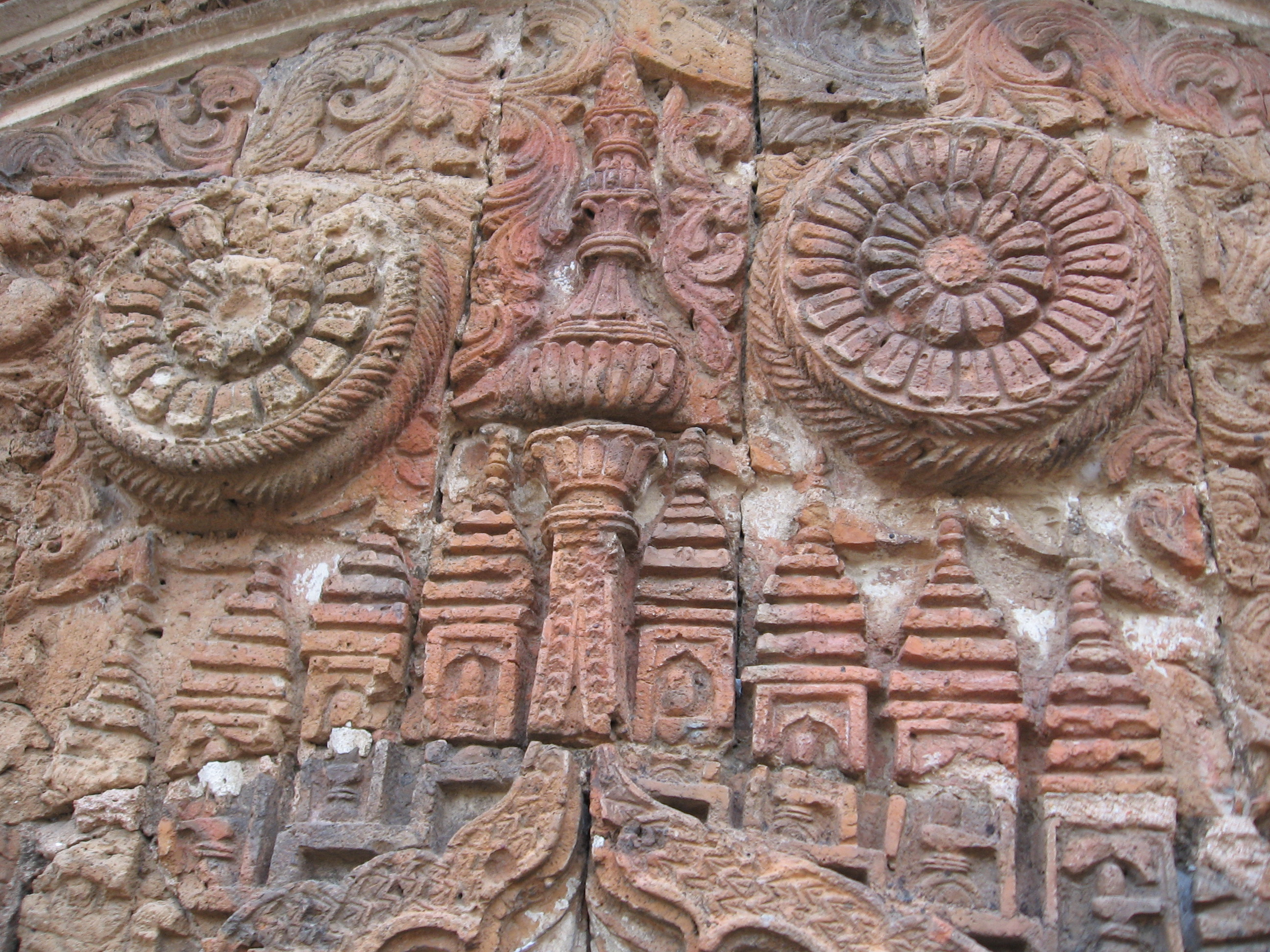
Terracotta carvings in a Nanoor temple

(4) the small decorated char chala Shiva temples at Nanoor,
(5) the Jora Shiva temple at Nanoor as a standard ‘Hooghly-Burdwan’ 18th century or earlier small at chala structures,
(6) the Vishnu temple at Serandi built in mid 19th century as a navaratna with turrets arranged without an upper storey and with porches on triple archways with terracotta façade, and
(7) the renovated Chand Raya (1768) temple at Uchkaran as a small flat roofed or Chandni type structure with traditional pillars and terracotta decoration.

== Healthcare ==
Nanoor Rural Hospital with 30 beds is the main medical facility in Nanoor CD block. There are primary health centres at Banagram, Khujutipara and Kirnahar.

== See also ==
- Nanoor travel guide from Wikivoyage
