= Parota (disambiguation) =

Parota redirects to Enterolobium cyclocarpum, a species of flowering tree in the pea family

Parota may also refer to:

- Parota, Birbhum, a census town in West Bengal, India
- Parotta, South Indian food
