= Bhedia =

Village in Jaunpur, Uttar Pradesh, India

Coordinates: 26°39′N 81°25′E

Bhedia is a village in Jaunpur, Uttar Pradesh, India.
