= Bidhan Chandra Majhi =

Indian politician

Bidhan Chandra Majhi is an Indian politician from Democratic Trinamool Congress. In May 2021, he was elected as the member of the West Bengal Legislative Assembly from Nanoor (Vidhan Sabha constituency). He won the election.
