= Bakreshwar Thermal Power Station =

Coal-fired power station in West Bengal, India

- Country: India
- Location: Chinpai and Bhurkuna gram panchayats, Birbhum district, West Bengal
- Coordinates: 23°50′00″N 87°27′00″E
- Status: Operational
- Commission date: 1999
- Owner: West Bengal Power Development Corporation Limited
- Operator: West Bengal Power Development Corporation

Power generation
- Units operational: 5 x 210 MW
- Nameplate capacity: 1,050 MW

Bakreshwar Thermal Power Station of West Bengal Power Development Corporation Limited is a power station with an installed capacity of 1050 MW (5x210 MW) and it is proposed for capacity expansion of another 500 MW.

== Location ==
Bakreshwar Thermal Power Station is located at 23°50′N 87°27′E in Chinpai and Bhurkuna gram panchayat areas of Birbhum district in the Indian state of West Bengal. It is located off the Panagarh–Morgram Highway, on the bank of Bakreshwar River some distance downstream from the hot springs and temple at Bakreshwar. Chinpai railway station on the Andal-Sainthia Branch Line and Bakreswar Thermal Power Plant Township are located nearby.

== Capacity ==
Five units of 210 MW each were commissioned in 1999, 2001, 2008 and 2010. For the first three units Japan Bank for International Cooperation gave a loan of 80.8 million yen or around Rs. 25.25 billion. The first unit was completed in a record time of 37 months and commissioned on 17 July 1999. The yardstick of Central Electricity Authority for construction of power units of 200–250 MW is 48 months.

Bakreshwar power project stage II involves installation of two units of 210 mW each at an estimated cost of Rs 20 billion.

== Neel Nirjan ==
The reservoir formed by erecting a dam in Bakreshwar River named Neel Nirjan (meaning blue solitude), for providing water to the thermal power plant, is gaining in popularity as a tourist spot.

== Political imbroglio ==
Bakreshwar Thermal Power Station was embroiled in political tussle for many years. It was initially proposed to be set up with central assistance but central funding was not forthcoming, in spite of the best efforts of the West Bengal leadership. Once the Left Front formed its government in 1977, Bakreshwar was in deeper political trouble. The delays over providing central funds for the project were cited by the Marxist leaders as another instance of the centre's "step-motherly" attitude to West Bengal. For several years, the Bakreshwar project was held up because the Soviet Union was requested to provide financial assistance. The Soviet funds never came even after several years of wait and negotiations. It was finally built by the state government.

== See also ==
- List of power stations in West Bengal
