= Nanoor Assembly constituency =

Nanoor
- Constituency No. 287 for the West Bengal Legislative Assembly
- Interactive Map Outlining Nanoor Assembly Constituency

Constituency details
- Country: India
- Region: East India
- State: West Bengal
- District: Birbhum
- Lok Sabha constituency: Bolpur
- Established: 1951
- Total electors: 218,071
- Reservation: SC

Member of Legislative Assembly
- 18th West Bengal Legislative Assembly
- Incumbent Bidhan Chandra Majhi
- Party: DTC
- Elected year: 2026

Nanoor Assembly constituency is an assembly constituency in Birbhum district in the Indian state of West Bengal. It is reserved for scheduled castes.

== Overview ==
As per orders of the Delimitation Commission, No. 287, Nanoor Assembly constituency (SC) is composed of the following: Nanoor CD Block, and Bahiri Panchshowa, Kankalitala, Kasba, Sarpalehana Albandha, Sian Muluk and Singhee gram panchayats of Bolpur Sriniketan CD Block.

Nanoor Assembly constituency is part of No. 41 Bolpur Lok Sabha constituency (SC).

== Members of Legislative Assembly ==
Year	Name	Party
Nanur
1952	Murarka Basanta Lal	Indian National Congress
Seat did not exist from 1957 to 1967
1967	S. Jash	Indian National Congress
1969	Banamali Das	Communist Party of India (Marxist)
1971	Banamali Das	Communist Party of India (Marxist)
1972	Banamali Das	Communist Party of India (Marxist)
1977	Banamali Das	Communist Party of India (Marxist)
1982	Banamali Das	Communist Party of India (Marxist)
1987	Ananda Gopal Das	Communist Party of India (Marxist)
1991	Ananda Gopal Das	Communist Party of India (Marxist)
1996	Ananda Gopal Das	Communist Party of India (Marxist)
2001	Ananda Gopal Das	Communist Party of India (Marxist)
2006	Joydeb Hazra	Communist Party of India (Marxist)
Nanoor
2011	Gadadhar Hazra	Trinamool Congress
2016	Shyamali Pradhan	Communist Party of India (Marxist)
2021	Bidhan Chandra Majhi	Trinamool Congress
2026	Bidhan Chandra Majhi	Trinamool Congress

== Election results ==
Vote share of Winning candidates
2026	47.37%
2021	47.64%
2016	50.07%
2011	49.21%
2006	58.56%
2001	54.07%
1996	56.66%
1991	57.30%
1987	63.36%
1982	55.79%
1977	63.04%
1972	58.51%
1971	50.16%
1969	57.72%
1967	43.93%
1952	16.80%
1952	18.53%

=== 2026 ===
2026 West Bengal Legislative Assembly election: Nanoor (SC)
Party	Candidate	Votes	%	±%
AITC	Bidhan Chandra Majhi	119,910	47.37	▼0.27
BJP	Khokan Das	111,788	44.16	▼0.65
CPI(M)	Shyamali Pradhan	10,589	4.18	▼1.29
INC	Abhay Das	3,040	1.20	
AJUP	Chiran Das	2,994	1.18	
NOTA	None of the Above	1,865	0.74	▼0.17
BSP	Ram Prasad Thandar	1,673	0.66	▼0.50
IND	Joyshri Hazra	1,260	0.50	
Majority		8,122	3.21	▲0.38
Turnout		253,119	93.88	▲8.86
AITC hold		Swing		

=== 2021 ===
2021 West Bengal Legislative Assembly election: Nanoor (SC)
Party	Candidate	Votes	%	±%
AITC	Bidhan Chandra Majhi	112,116	47.64	▲9.91
BJP	Tarakeswar Saha	105,446	44.81	▲35.93
CPI(M)	Shyamali Pradhan	12,878	5.47	▼44.60
BSP	Chandipada Das	2,739	1.16	
NOTA	None of the Above	2,149	0.91	▼1.17
Majority		6,670	2.83	▼9.51
Turnout		235,328	85.02	▲2.29
Swing to AITC from CPI(M)		Swing		

=== 2016 ===
2016 West Bengal Legislative Assembly election: Nanoor (SC)
Party	Candidate	Votes	%	±%
CPI(M)	Shyamali Pradhan	104,374	50.07	▲4.00
AITC	Gadadhar Hazra	78,644	37.73	▼11.48
BJP	Tarakeswar Saha	18,502	8.88	▲4.16
NOTA	None of the Above	4,342	2.08	
IND	Sebashish Bagdi	2,602	1.25	
Majority		25,730	12.34	▲9.20
Turnout		208,464	82.73	▼2.73
Swing to CPI(M) from AITC		Swing		

=== 2011 ===
2011 West Bengal Legislative Assembly election: Nanoor (SC)
Party	Candidate	Votes	%	±%
AITC	Gadadhar Hazra	91,818	49.21	▲15.91
CPI(M)	Shyamali Pradhan	85,955	46.07	▼12.49
BJP	Rajkumar Fulmali	8,811	4.72	
Majority		5,863	3.14	▼22.12
Turnout		186,584	85.46	
Swing to AITC from CPI(M)		Swing		

=== 2006 ===
2006 West Bengal Legislative Assembly election: Nanur (SC)
Party	Candidate	Votes	%	±%
CPI(M)	Joydeb Hazra	72,713	58.56	▲4.49
AITC	Gadadhar Hazra	41,348	33.30	▼9.67
INC	Tapan Kumar Saha	10,106	8.14	
Majority		31,365	25.26	▲14.16
Turnout		124,167		
CPI(M) hold		Swing		

=== 2001 ===
2001 West Bengal Legislative Assembly election: Nanur (SC)
Party	Candidate	Votes	%	±%
CPI(M)	Anand Gopal Das	65,520	54.07	▼2.59
AITC	Krishnagopal Majhi	52,073	42.97	
PDS	Tarun Das	2,146	1.77	
IND	Kartick Majhi	1,446	1.19	
Majority		13,447	11.10	▼8.22
Turnout		121,215	78.50	▼0.91
CPI(M) hold		Swing		

=== 1996 ===
1996 West Bengal Legislative Assembly election: Nanur (SC)
Party	Candidate	Votes	%	±%
CPI(M)	Anandagopal Das	62,252	56.66	▼0.64
INC	Sibkinkar Saha	41,029	37.34	▲12.28
BJP	Jatadhari Dhibar	6,398	5.82	▼11.81
IND	Simai Das	196	0.18	
Majority		21,223	19.32	▼12.92
Turnout		112,412	79.41	▲1.87
CPI(M) hold		Swing		

=== 1991 ===
1991 West Bengal Legislative Assembly election: Nanur (SC)
Party	Candidate	Votes	%	±%
CPI(M)	Ananda Gopal Das	57,385	57.30	▼6.06
INC	Sib Kinkar Saha	25,100	25.06	▼11.58
BJP	Soumendra Samajdar	17,656	17.63	
Majority		32,285	32.24	▲5.52
Turnout		102,606	77.54	▲3.67
CPI(M) hold		Swing		

=== 1987 ===
1987 West Bengal Legislative Assembly election: Nanur (SC)
Party	Candidate	Votes	%	±%
CPI(M)	Ananda Gopal Das	54,315	63.36	▲7.57
INC	Adhir Kumar Saha	31,403	36.64	▼7.57
Majority		22,912	26.72	▲15.14
Turnout		87,131	73.87	▼10.22
CPI(M) hold		Swing		

=== 1982 ===
1982 West Bengal Legislative Assembly election: Nanur (SC)
Party	Candidate	Votes	%	±%
CPI(M)	Banamali Das	45,052	55.79	▼7.25
INC	Sib Kinkar Saha	35,705	44.21	▲25.62
Majority		9,347	11.58	▼32.87
Turnout		82,597	84.09	▲31.01
CPI(M) hold		Swing		

=== 1977 ===
1977 West Bengal Legislative Assembly election: Nanur (SC)
Party	Candidate	Votes	%	±%
CPI(M)	Banamali Das	27,107	63.04	
INC	Dulal Saha	7,993	18.59	
JP	Kebal Ram Hazra	7,657	17.81	
IND	Sristidhar Jash	240	0.56	
Majority		19,114	44.45	
Turnout		44,072	53.08	
Swing to CPI(M) from INC		Swing		

=== 1972 ===
1972 West Bengal Legislative Assembly election: Nanur (SC)
Party	Candidate	Votes	%	±%
INC	Saha Dulal	25,018	58.51	
CPI(M)	Banamali Das	17,743	41.49	
Majority		7,275	17.02	
Turnout		44,018	58.11	
Swing to INC from CPI(M)		Swing		

=== 1971 ===
1971 West Bengal Legislative Assembly election: Nanur (SC)
Party	Candidate	Votes	%	±%
CPI(M)	Banamali Das	18,486	50.16	
BAC	Ila Das	12,420	33.70	
CPI	Sakti Pada Bagdi	5,150	13.97	
INC(O)	Sristidhar Josh	800	2.17	
Majority		6,066	16.46	
Turnout		40,137	53.84	
CPI(M) hold		Swing		

=== 1969 ===
1969 West Bengal Legislative Assembly election: Nanur (SC)
Party	Candidate	Votes	%	±%
CPI(M)	Banamali Das	22,048	57.72	
INC	Sristidhar Josh	14,252	37.31	
PBI (Note: Proutist Bloc India)	Nilkanta Hazra	752	1.97	
NDF	Sridharchandra Shha	696	1.82	
BJD	Joydeb Saha	449	1.18	
Majority		7,796	20.41	
Turnout		39,382	55.29	
Swing to CPI(M) from INC		Swing		

=== 1967 ===
1967 West Bengal Legislative Assembly election: Nanur (SC)
Party	Candidate	Votes	%	±%
INC	S. Jash	14,627	43.93	
CPI(M)	B. Das	12,187	36.60	
BAC	K. K. Das	6,484	19.47	
Majority		2,440	7.33	
Turnout		35,931	51.12	
INC hold		Swing		

=== 1952 ===
1952 West Bengal Legislative Assembly election: Nanur (2 seats)
Party	Candidate	Votes	%	±%
INC	Murarka Basanta Lal	13,027	18.53	
INC	Saha Sisir Kumar	11,810	16.80	
HM	Roy Anadi Kinkar	10,759	15.31	
CPI	Hazara Ram Chandra	10,598	15.08	
CPI	Chattaraj Radhanath	10,294	14.65	
IND	Mukhopadyay Kali Kinkar	5,682	8.08	
RCPI	Das Dhirendra Mohan	2,831	4.03	
KMPP	Saha Nilkantha	2,458	3.50	
IND	Dalui Amulya Ratan	1,500	2.13	
IND	Nath Kali Charan	1,326	1.89	
Majority		1,217	1.73	
Turnout		70,285	71.15	
INC win (new seat)				
