= Ajay River =

River in India

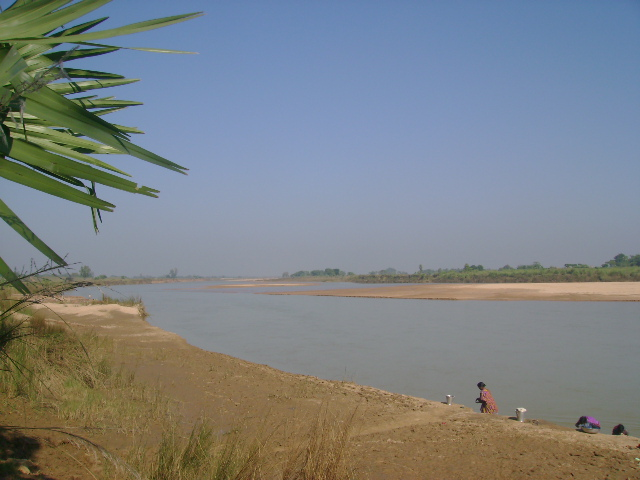

- Location of mouth
- Etymology: Sanskrit: Unconquerable

Location
- Country: India
- State: Bihar, Jharkhand, West Bengal
- Cities: Deoghar, Jamtara, Chittaranjan, Pandabeswar, Illambazar, Bhedia, Bolpur, Nutanhat Katwa

Physical characteristics
- Source
  - location: Tola BaridihJamui, Bihar
  - coordinates: 24°50′58″N 86°32′14″E
  - elevation: 400 metres (1,300 ft)
- Mouth: Katwa
  - location: Katwa, West Bengal
  - coordinates: 24°06′07″N 88°13′17″E
  - elevation: 21 metres (69 ft)
- Length: 334 km (208 mi)
- Discharge
  - location: Hooghly River

Basin features
- Tributaries
  - right: Pathro and Jayanti in Jharkhand, Tumuni and Kunur in Bardhaman district of West Bengal

The Ajay (/ˈədʒɑɪ/) is a river which flows through the Indian states of Bihar, Jharkhand and West Bengal. The catchment area of Ajay River is 6,000 square kilometres (2,300 mi^{2}). It is a tributary of the Hooghly river.

== See also ==
List of rivers of India
