= Bolpur Lok Sabha constituency =

Lok Sabha constituency in West Bengal

Coordinates: 23°40′N 87°43′E

Bolpur WB-41
- Lok Sabha constituency
- Interactive Map Outlining Bolpur Lok Sabha Constituency

Constituency details
- Country: India
- Region: East India
- State: West Bengal
- Assembly constituencies: Ausgram; Bolpur; Ketugram; Labpur; Mayureswar; Mangalkot; Nanoor
- Established: 1967
- Total electors: 18,39,234
- Reservation: SC

Member of Parliament
- 18th Lok Sabha
- Incumbent Asit Kumar Mal
- Party: NCPI
- Alliance: NDA
- Elected year: 2024

Bolpur Lok Sabha constituency is in West Bengal, in India. While four assembly segments of No. 41 Bolpur Lok Sabha constituency are in Birbhum district, three are in Purba Bardhaman district. The seat was a free seat till 2004, but was declared reserved for scheduled castes from 2009 general elections.

== Assembly segments ==
Parliamentary constituencies in West Bengal – 1. Cooch Behar, 2. Alipurduars, 3. Jalpaiguri, 4. Darjeeling, 5. Raiganj, 6. Balurghat, 7. Maldaha Uttar, 8. Maldaha Dakshin, 9. Jangipur, 10. Baharampur, 11. Murshidabad, 12. Krishnanagar, 13. Ranaghat, 14. Bangaon, 15. Barrackpore, 16. Dum Dum, 17. Barasat, 18. Basirhat, 19. Jaynagar, 20. Mathurapur, 21. Diamond Harbour, 22. Jadavpur, 23. Kolkata Dakshin, 24. Kolkata Uttar, 25. Howrah, 26. Uluberia, 27. Serampore, 28. Hooghly, 29. Arambagh, 30. Tamluk, 31, Kanthi, 32. Ghatal, 33. Jhargram, 34. Medinipur, 35. Purulia, 36. Bankura, 37. Bishnupur, 38. Bardhaman Purba, 39. Bardhaman Durgapur

As per order of the Delimitation Commission issued in 2006 in respect of the delimitation of constituencies in the West Bengal, parliamentary constituency no. 41 Bolpur, reserved for Scheduled castes (SC), is composed of the following assembly segments:

#	Name	District	Member	Party	2024 Lead
271	Ketugram	Purba Bardhaman	Anadi Ghosh	BJP	AITC
272	Mangalkot	Purba Bardhaman	Shishir Ghosh	BJP	AITC
273	Ausgram (SC)	Purba Bardhaman	Kalita Maji	BJP	AITC
286	Bolpur	Birbhum	Chandranath Sinha	AITC	AITC
287	Nanoor (SC)	Birbhum	Bidhan Chandra Majhi	AITC	AITC
288	Labpur	Birbhum	Debasish Ojha	BJP	AITC
290	Mayureswar	Birbhum	Dudh Kumar Mondal	BJP	AITC

Prior to delimitation, Bolpur Lok Sabha constituency was composed of the following assembly segments:Ausgram (SC) (assembly constituency no. 267), Mangalkot (assembly constituency no. 281), Nanoor (SC) (assembly constituency no. 283), Bolpur (assembly constituency no. 284), Labpur (assembly constituency no. 285), Dubrajpur (assembly constituency no. 286) and Mayureswar (SC) (assembly constituency no. 290)

== Members of Parliament ==
Year	Member	Party
1967	Anil Kumar Chanda	Indian National Congress
1971	Saradish Roy	Communist Party of India (Marxist)
1977	Saradish Roy	Communist Party of India (Marxist)
1980	Saradish Roy	Communist Party of India (Marxist)
1984	Saradish Roy	Communist Party of India (Marxist)
1985^	Somnath Chatterjee	Communist Party of India (Marxist)
1989	Somnath Chatterjee	Communist Party of India (Marxist)
1991	Somnath Chatterjee	Communist Party of India (Marxist)
1996	Somnath Chatterjee	Communist Party of India (Marxist)
1998	Somnath Chatterjee	Communist Party of India (Marxist)
1999	Somnath Chatterjee	Communist Party of India (Marxist)
2004	Somnath Chatterjee	Communist Party of India (Marxist)
2009	Ram Chandra Dome	Communist Party of India (Marxist)
2014	Anupam Hazra	Trinamool Congress
2019	Asit Kumar Mal	Trinamool Congress
2024	Asit Kumar Mal	Trinamool Congress
2026 (Note: Switched to NCPI as part of AITC Rebels in Lok Sabha.)	Asit Kumar Mal	Nationalist Citizens Party of India

== Election results ==
Vote share of Winning candidates
2024	55.98%
2019	47.83%
2014	48.33%
2009	49.90%
2004	65.80%
1999	59.36%
1998	59.55%
1996	60.55%
1991	56.64%
1989	60.42%
1985 (by-poll)	56.92%
1984	55.09%
1980	54.97%
1977	50.19%
1971	45.39%
1967	52.73%

=== 2024 ===
2024 Indian general election: Bolpur
Party	Candidate	Votes	%	±%
AITC	Asit Kumar Mal	855,633	55.98	
BJP	Piya Saha	528,380	34.57	
CPI(M)	Shyamali Pradhan	99,383	6.50	
NOTA	None of the Above	21,722	1.42	
IND	Atul Chandra Bauri	7,829	0.51	
BSP	Dr. Manik Chandra Prodhan	7,039	0.46	
MPOI (Note: Mulnibasi Party of India)	Shanta Das	3,640	0.24	
SUCI(C)	Bijoy Dolui	2,792	0.18	
HSS (Note: Hindustan Shakti Sena)	Mantu Dhibar	2,052	0.13	
Majority		327,253	21.41	
Turnout		1,528,470	82.66	
AITC hold		Swing		

=== 2019 ===
2019 Indian general election: Bolpur
Party	Candidate	Votes	%	±%
AITC	Asit Kumar Mal	699,171	47.83	
BJP	Das Ramprasad	592,769	40.55	
CPI(M)	Ram Chandra Dome	91,964	6.29	
INC	Abhijit Saha	30,112	2.06	
RVNP (Note: Rashtravadi Janata Party)	Simanta Mondal	17,013	1.16	
NOTA	None of the Above	12,278	0.84	
BSP	Das Samiran	9,165	0.63	
SUCI(C)	Bijoy Dolui	8,797	0.60	
Majority		106,402	7.28	
Turnout		1,461,269	85.74	
AITC hold		Swing		

=== 2014 ===
2014 Indian general election: Bolpur
Party	Candidate	Votes	%	±%
AITC	Anupam Hazra	630,693	48.33	
CPI(M)	Ramchandra Dome	394,581	30.23	
BJP	Kamini Mohan Sarkar	197,474	15.13	
INC	Tapan Kumar Saha	46,953	3.60	
NOTA	None of the Above	17,322	1.33	
JDP	Sanjib Malik	6,371	0.49	
BSP	Samiran Das	5,952	0.46	
SUCI(C)	Bijoy Dolui	5,410	0.41	
Majority		236,112	18.10	
Turnout		1,304,756	84.81	
Swing to AITC from CPI(M)		Swing		

=== 2009 ===
2009 Indian general elections: Bolpur
Party	Candidate	Votes	%	±%
CPI(M)	Ram Chandra Dome	508,383	49.90	
INC	Asit Kumar Mal	411,501	38.14	
BJP	Arjun Saha	70,084	6.49	
AUDF	Adara Bauri	21,325	1.97	
IND	Professor Bijay Dalui	14,581	1.35	
IND	Nihar Hazra	11,798	1.09	
BSP	Vidyasagar Mete	11,139	1.03	
Majority		96,882	11.76	
Turnout		1,078,811	82.49	
CPI(M) hold		Swing		

=== 2004 ===
General Election, 2004: Bolpur
Party	Candidate	Votes	%	±%
CPI(M)	Somnath Chatterjee	504,836	65.80	
AITC	Dr. Nirmal Kumar Maji	194,531	25.30	
INC	Dhananjoy Saha	48,756	6.49	
IND	Budhen Soren	9,860	1.30	
BSP	Bhabotosh Mandal	6,561	0.09	
IND	Bijoy Dolui	5,515	0.07	
Majority		310,305	40.40	
Turnout		7,67,695	74.2	
CPI(M) hold		Swing		

=== 1999 ===
General Election, 1999: Bolpur
Party	Candidate	Votes	%	±%
CPI(M)	Somnath Chatterjee	464,199	59.36	
AITC	Suniti Chattaraj	277,810	35.53	
INC	Dr. Sushil Banerjee	37,093	4.74	
JP	Nazma	2,852	0.36	
Majority		186,389	23.50	
Turnout		7,81,954	76.43	
CPI(M) hold		Swing		

=== 1998 ===
General Election, 1998: Bolpur
Party	Candidate	Votes	%	±%
CPI(M)	Somnath Chatterjee	470,645	59.55	
AITC	Gour Hari Chanda	219,553	27.78	
INC	Suniti Chattaraj	110,091	12.67	
Majority		251,092	31.30	
Turnout		7,81,954	78.55	
CPI(M) hold		Swing		

=== 1996 ===
1996 Indian general election: Bolpur
Party	Candidate	Votes	%	±%
CPI(M)	Somnath Chatterjee	471,549	60.55	
INC	Sunil Das	217,903	27.98	
BJP	Tara Prosanna Sinha	76,548	9.83	
IND	Modaswar Hossain	8,670	1.11	
IND	Md. Sadakas	1,987	0.26	
IND	Maharaj Mistry	1,482	0.19	
IND	Abu Taher Mirza	669	0.09	
Majority		253,646	32.57	
Turnout		802,298	82.10	
CPI(M) hold		Swing		

=== 1991 ===
1991 Indian general election: Bolpur
Party	Candidate	Votes	%	±%
CPI(M)	Somnath Chatterjee	394,496	56.64	
IND	Jivan Mukhopadhyay	167,872	24.10	
BJP	Tara Prasanna Singha	117,394	16.85	
IND	Aloke Mukherjee	7,577	1.09	
BSP	Sailendra Nath Majumder	2,654	0.38	
JP	Shymali Ghosh	2,392	0.34	
IND	Sunil Kumar Mitra	2,149	0.31	
DDP (Note: Doordarshi Party)	Maharaj Mistry	920	0.13	
IND	Manohar Marmu	615	0.09	
IND	Abu Tahir Mirza	428	0.06	
Majority		226,624	32.54	
Turnout		713,844	77.17	
CPI(M) hold		Swing		

=== 1989 ===
1989 Indian general election: Bolpur
Party	Candidate	Votes	%	±%
CPI(M)	Somnath Chatterjee	421,483	60.42	
INC	Sachinandan Sau	257,890	36.97	
IND	Madeswar Hossain	8,164	1.17	
JP	Mahonmbd Saddu Kas	5,045	0.72	
IND	Rabindranath Ghosh	2,587	0.37	
IND	Abu Taher Mirza	1,437	0.21	
IND	Sanat Kumar Datta	1,027	0.15	
Majority		163,593	23.45	
Turnout		711,128	79.20	
CPI(M) hold		Swing		

=== 1985 by-election ===
A by-election was held in this constituency in 1985 which was necessitated by the Sudden Death of sitting CPIM-MP Dr. Saradish Roy. In the by-election, Somnath Chatterjee of CPIM defeated his nearest rival Siddhartha Shankar Ray of Congress by 98,999 votes.

1985 Bolpur Lok Sabha by-election
Party	Candidate	Votes	%	±%
CPI(M)	Somnath Chatterjee	339,078	56.92	
INC	Siddhartha Shankar Ray	240,079	40.30	
IND	K. K. Roy	10,087	1.69	
IND	M. Hossain	4,182	0.70	
IND	N. C. Mandal	2,245	0.38	
Majority		98,999	16.62	
Turnout		595,671	62.82	
CPI(M) hold		Swing		

=== 1984 ===
1984 Indian general election: Bolpur
Party	Candidate	Votes	%	±%
CPI(M)	Saradish Roy	317,749	55.09	
INC	Nihar Dutta	256,818	44.53	
IND	Narayan Chandra Mandal	2,170	0.38	
Majority		60,931	10.56	
Turnout		589,186	78.26	
CPI(M) hold		Swing		

=== 1980 ===
1980 Indian general election: Bolpur
Party	Candidate	Votes	%	±%
CPI(M)	Saradish Roy	264,798	54.97	
INC(I)	Pranab Kumar Mukherjee	196,169	40.72	
IND	Kaitish Chandra Chattopadhyay	8,718	1.81	
IND	Narayan Chandra Mandal	3,872	0.80	
JP(S)	Modeswar Hossain	2,809	0.58	
INC(U)	Gour Harichandra	2,236	0.46	
IND	Nirmal Saha	1,771	0.37	
IND	Dilip Banerjee	1,353	0.28	
Majority		68,629	14.24	
Turnout		493,812	74.04	
CPI(M) hold		Swing		

=== 1977 ===
1977 Indian general election: Bolpur
Party	Candidate	Votes	%	±%
CPI(M)	Saradish Roy	128,963	50.19	
CPI	Durga Banerjee	93,012	36.20	
IND	Chattopadhyay Mihir Lal	22,465	8.74	
IND	Abdul Kased Mallick (Based)	7,737	3.01	
IND	Bankim Chattopadhyaya	2,493	0.97	
IND	Kazi Golam Kader	2,262	0.88	
Majority		35,951	13.99	
Turnout		266,128	48.36	
CPI(M) hold		Swing		

=== 1971 ===
1971 Indian general election: Bolpur
Party	Candidate	Votes	%	±%
CPI(M)	Saradish Roy	115,591	45.39	
INC	Phulrenu Guha	78,966	31.01	
AIFB	Adhyapak Osman Ghani	26,429	10.38	
Bangla Congress	Bhupal Chandra Bose	21,855	8.58	
INC(O)	Biva Mitra	8,081	3.17	
IND	Gopen Lahiry	3,762	1.48	
Majority		36,625	14.38	
Turnout		270,782	52.77	
Swing to CPI(M) from INC		Swing		

=== 1967 ===
1967 Indian general election: Bolpur
Party	Candidate	Votes	%	±%
INC	Anil Kumar Chanda	131,761	52.73	
CPI(M)	Saradish Roy	118,129	47.27	
Majority		13,632	5.46	
Turnout		259,965	53.75	
INC win (new seat)				

== See also ==
- List of constituencies of the Lok Sabha
