= Palli Samgathana Vibhaga =

School associated with Visva-Bharati University

- Visva-Bharati University
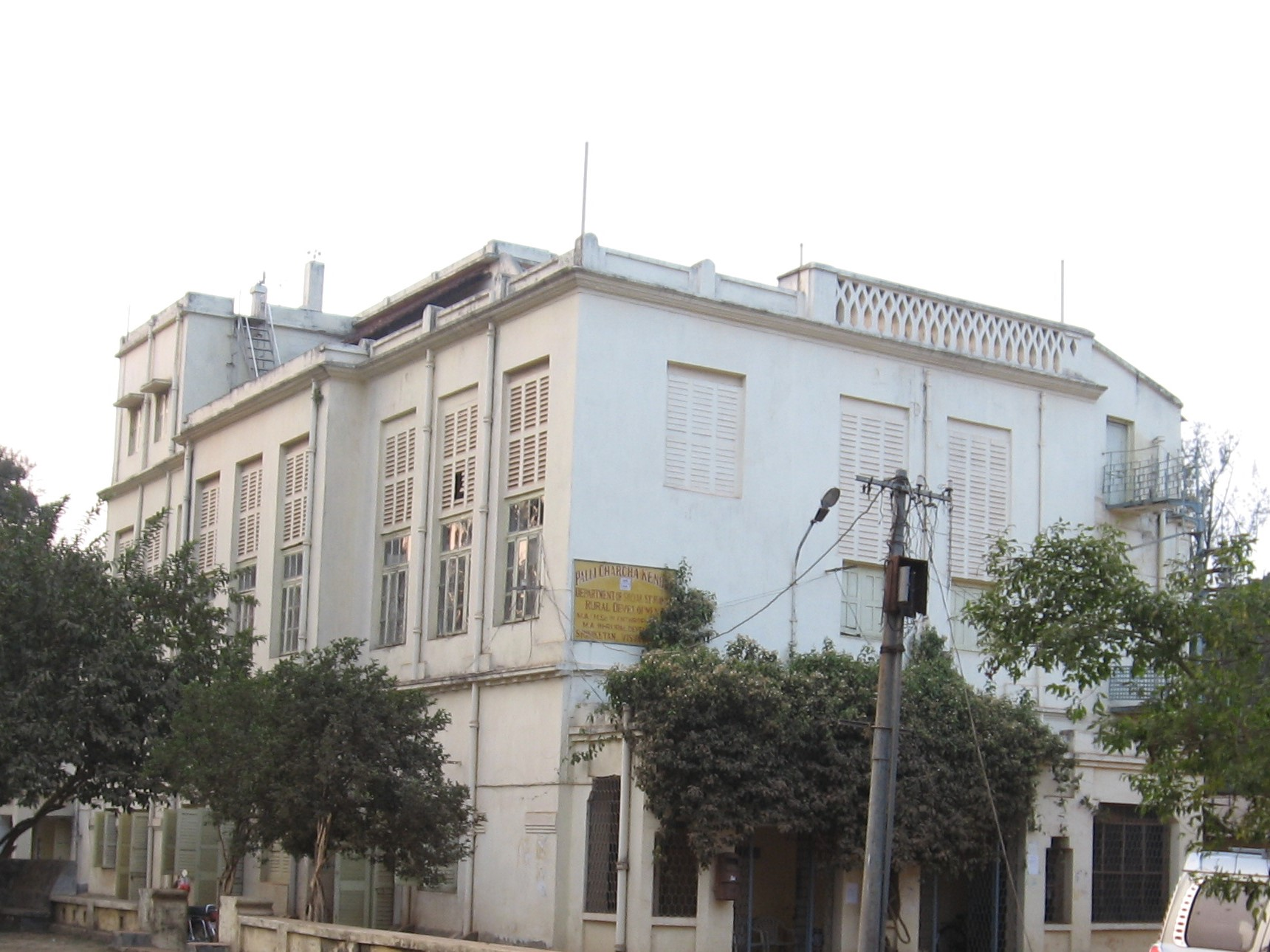
- Institute of Rural Reconstruction at Sriniketan
- Location: Sriniketan, West Bengal, India
- Coordinates: 23.6671°N 87.6617°E
- Abbreviation: P.S.V.
- Founder: Rabindranath Tagore
- Established: 1922
- Principal: Prof. Arabinda Mandal
- Website: visvabharati.ac.in/PalliSamgathanaVibhaga.html

Palli Samgathana Vibhaga (Institute of Rural Reconstruction), of Visva-Bharati University, was established at Sriniketan in 1922, by the Nobel laureate Rabindranath Tagore. Leonard Knight Elmhirst was its first director. This department was closely founded by Rathindranath Tagore (eldest son of Guru Rabindranath Tagore) which had always aimed in closely serving with the local-tribes and rural life of the people.

== Overview ==
Rabindranath was engaged in his zamindari work in his family estates at Shilaidaha and Patisar during 1890s. In an address to the workers of Sriniketan in 1939, he said, "Gradually the sorrow and poverty of the villagers became clear to me, and I began to grow restless to do something about it ….from that time onward I continuously endeavoured to find out how villagers’ mind could be aroused, so that they themselves could accept responsibility for their own lives." Tagore wrote, "Life in villages must be made more attractive, work and joy must be combined and an aesthetic sense should be developed."

The village-oriented activities at Sriniketan were multi-faceted. "In Sikha-Satra and Sikha-Charcha-Bhavana, the village boys belonging to all castes received education as well as instruction in music, agriculture, hygiene and sanitation and also in village craft. Experiments were undertaken for varieties of new crops that may be suitable for local conditions in the department of agriculture. Scientific experiments were made in dairy and animal husbandry for improvement of financial conditions of village people. Revival of cottage industries and introduction of new ones was the main motto of the activities in Silpa-Bhavana. Thus, income from agriculture could be supplemented with the help of rural industries. Village Welfare Department took initiative for public works like road repairing, tank cleaning and maintaining a circulation library. Brati Balak or boy-scouts organization and Maternity and Child Welfare section were established in 1940. A number of Co-operative Health Societies provided medical treatment at a low cost for the villagers…"

== History ==
In 1921 Rabindranath bought a large manor house with surrounding lands in Surul, 3 km from Santiniketan, from the Sinhas of Raipur. He set up the Institute of Rural Reconstruction in the manor house, in 1922 with Leonard Knight Elmhirst as its first director. Rathindranath Tagore, Santosh Chandra Majumdar, Gourgopal Ghosh, Kalimohan Ghosh and Kim Taro Kasahara joined Elmhirst.

The second but contiguous campus of Visva Bharati was subsequently located around the same place in 1923 and it came to be known as Sriniketan. Silpa Bhavana at Santiniketan had already started training in handicrafts. Sriniketan took over the work with the objective bringing back life in its completeness to the villages and help people to solve their own problems instead of solution being imposed on them from outside. An emphasis was laid on a scientific study of the village problem before a solution was attempted.

In consonance with such ideas about reconstruction of village life a new type of school meant mainly for the children of neighbouring villages, who would eventually bring the offering of their acquired knowledge for the welfare of the village community, was also conceived. Siksha-Satra was such a school set up at Santiniketan in 1924 but shifted to Sriniketan in 1927. The Loka-Siksha Samsad an organisation for the propagation of non-formal education amongst those who had no access to usual educational opportunities, was started in 1936. Siksha Charcha for training village school teachers followed next year. In 1963, an agricultural college was set up in Sriniketan and in 1977 Rural Research Centre was set up.

== The Institute of Rural Reconstruction ==
Just because Santiniketan is home to such institutions as Kala Bhavana and Sangit Bhavana, it must not be assumed that Visva-Bharati came to represent only a dreamy aesthetic outlook that ignored the harsh realities of everyday life. Tagore founded an Institute of Rural Reconstruction in 1922. The place came to be known as Sriniketan (Abode of well-being). He launched a vigorous programme of rural reform that aimed to address the problems that pervaded rural India in the early twentieth century, problems like poverty, disease, ignorance, superstition and caste. Sriniketan is more of a place where anyone gets to meet the reality much closer to the heart and give a pause to the gloomy life. Its a journey to become and empower more resilience, self -taught, confident, respectful while gracefully carrying the culture and tradition of every individual.

The Institute of Rural Reconstruction, known (in Bengali) as Palli Samgathana Vibhaga has four departments: Lifelong Learning and Extension (Department of Adult, Continuing Education and Extension), Palli Charcha Kendra (a teaching department founded in 1977), Department of Social Work (a teaching department founded in 1963 and offers social work degrees at undergraduate, post-graduate and Ph D levels) and Silpa Sadan (a Centre for development of the Design, Art, Culture and Technology and implement with the Rural Reconstruction and Development). Palli Siksha Bhavana (Institute of Agricultural Science), also located at Sriniketan, is a separate institute that imparts education in agricultural sciences.

Silpa Sadana (earlier called Silpa Bhavana) offers 4- year design course according to the New Education Policy (NEP) with accredation of the CUET (UG) for all the major trades Furniture & Interior Design, Textile & Apparel Design and Ceramic & Glass Design. As per the NEP any candidate enrolling in the Major Trade, gets to select a subsidiary or a minor trade, which includes options from Hand Made Paper (Paper Making & Packaging)/ Ceramic & Glass/ Textile Weaving/ Leather (Batik & Binding) Furniture Design. In this curriculum the candidate gets to complete their Certificate Course in 1-year, Diploma Course in 2-year, Bachelors in 3-year and Masters in 4-year Masters. The institute also provides Ph.D courses to the specified trades. Before NEP the education structure involved 4-years Bachelors & 2-years Masters for the said Major Trades. Along with that it also offered the certificate (2-year) and diploma/ vocational courses (3-years) in leather craft, book binding and handmade packaging, batik work and handmade paper making, handloom weaving, pottery and wood craft. The present eligibility criteria for attending to any of the courses is the candidate must have completed class 12, and appear to CUET-UG to enroll and depending upon the percentage of marks/ ranks they are selected. However, for Masters in Design one must belog from Bachelors of Design/ Art/ Architecture (or similar technical courses which are equivalent to B.Des course). Siksha Charcha offers 2-year D El Ed course.

The Rural Extension Centre (Department of Adult, Continuing Education and Extension) is one of the oldest units under Palli Samgathana Vibhaga, Visva-Bharati. It has been actively engaged in improving the condition of the villagers since its inception. The idea is to encourage the villagers to become self-reliant through formation of village development societies, self-help groups, Brati organisations, mohila samities and the like. The area of operation of the unit spread over 43 villages under 8 Gram Panchayats in 2 blocks of Bolpur Sriniketan and Illambazar.

The Indian Council of Agricultural Research established the Krishi Vigyan Kendra mandated for the district of Birbhum, West Bengal in 1994 under the administrative control of Palli Siksha Bhavana. It was named as Rathindra Krishi Vigyan Kendra to pay tributes, homage and regards to Rathindranath Tagore, the man who was the guiding force behind the whole "Sriniketan Experiment".

== Sriniketan model: evaluation ==
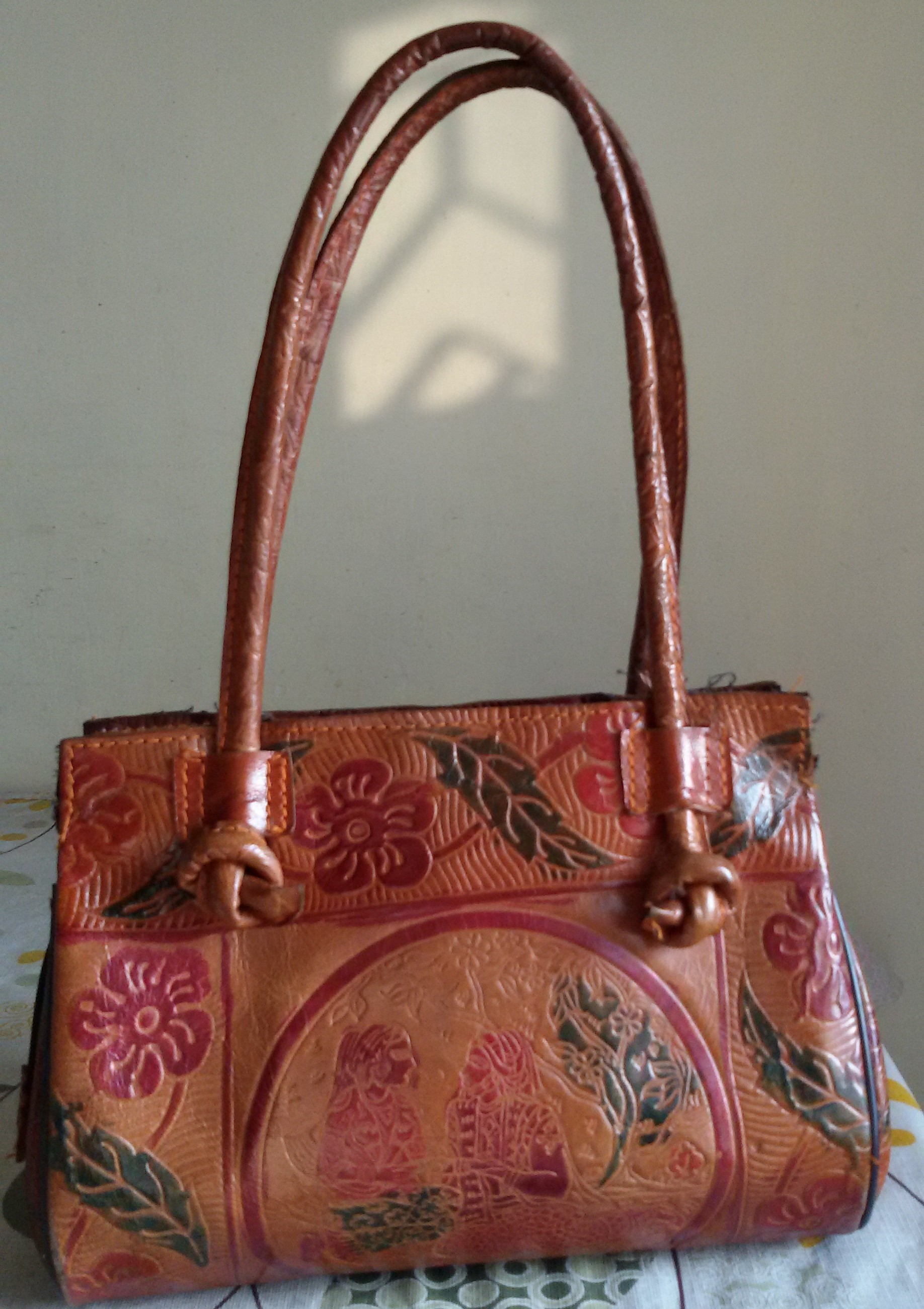
Santiniketan leather bag with batik design

Recent studies have been highlighting the concepts and role of the institute in uplifting the local economy:

"In the village of Surul, renamed Sriniketan, adjacent to Santiniketan, he (Rabindranath Tagore) started an Institute of Rural Reconstruction with the help of a Cornell-trained English agricultural expert, Leonard Elmhirst. The kind of work that was begun here has since been repeated and elaborated in many programmes of self-help in India. For instance, Sriniketan pioneered the manufacture of hand-crafted leather purses and handbags, a cottage industry which has, since then, taken off elsewhere as well and now exports products to many parts of the world."Santiniketan Leather Goods have secured GI tag.

"The small scale cottage industry and handicraft items of Sriniketan are identified as special ethnic and traditional products, recognised nationally and even internationally with high esteem. Students of Tagore’s art and craft centre at Sriniketan and the artists of Kala Bhavana are known for their extra-ordinary skill and craftsmanship. The surrounding part of the rural economy at this region is basically thriving on a plural economy, sometimes contributing to seasonal sustenance of village families.

"A number of survey reports in the Surul village adjoining Sriniketan reveal that the dwelling units of this village are mostly living on traditional kantha stitch designing on silk and cotton sarees and other accessories, upholsteries continuing throughout the year. These items involve most of the women of the villages from mainly minority and backward classes who have developed unique skills through repetitive and voluminous productivity. The men of these families search for market outlets and help these products fetching a fair price. It is very interesting to note that now-a-days this particular occupation has taken a systematic mass engagement pattern where a number of self-help groups with cluster of at least 9 to 11 or more women together, earning their daily wages and even forming a co-operative for financial support through micro-finance.

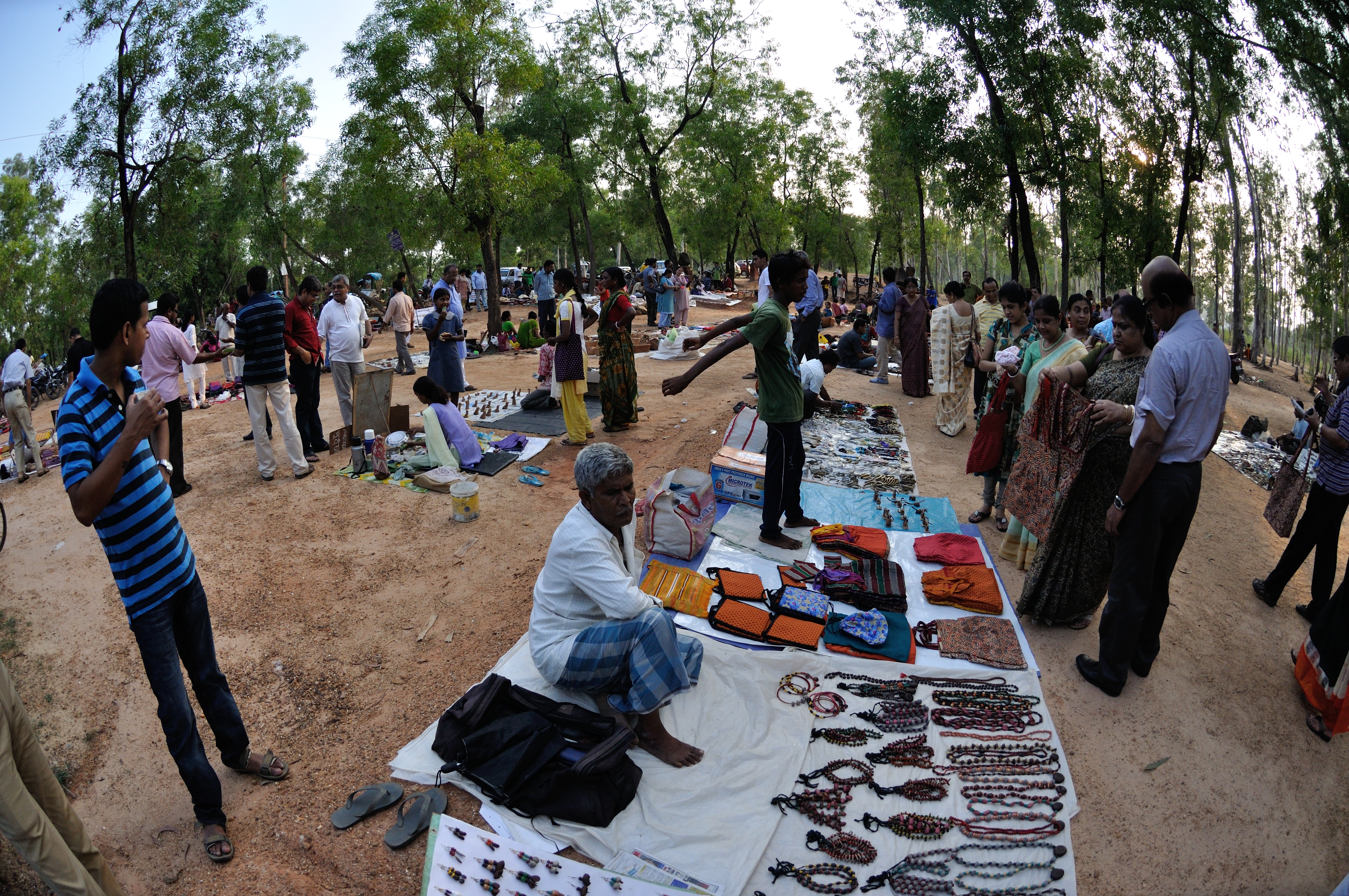
Local village handicrafts at the Saturday Haat at Sonajhuri

"NIFT, the nation-level textile organisation has been working on this model and a good number of NGOs are also coming forward for utilising these rich resource of skilled artisans. These products fortunately earned reputation not only in the local and national markets, emporiums, shops and exhibitions but they are also exported outside to attract a special focus on ladies and gents fashion statements. "Kantha stitch occupies the centre stage of Sriniketan’s sustainable economy, there are many more which endowed value to develop Tagore’s dreams of turning Sriniketan as a hub of multi-dimensional artist…Leather goods and handicrafts are equally adorable. Terracota is another speciality masterpiece of the region. The modern architectural interiors, wall designing, roof and floor tiles and decoration pieces are mostly crafted with this material capturing the craze of the modern designers… the thermocole Durga, Ganesha, replica of temples of repute exhibit amazing signs of excellence and signature expertise… Plants and plantation export-based programmes are expanding due to the fertile soil and a number of people are working on it which may convert the important destination Sriniketan into a piece of Green Earth where florists and agriculturists tirelessly dedicate them into creating beautiful nurseries of plants and flowers of special types including orchids and medicinal plants and thus toiling on lush greenery of crops and harvests…"

== See also ==
- Notable people associated with Santiniketan
