= Binuria =

- Village
- Location in West Bengal, India Binuria (India)
- Coordinates: 23.66833333°N 87.6325°E
- Country: India
- State: West Bengal
- District: Birbhum
- Elevation: 58 m (190 ft)

Population (2011)
  - Total: 2,592

Languages
  - Official: Bengali, English
- Time zone: UTC+5:30 (IST)
- PIN: 731236
- Lok Sabha constituency: Bolpur
- Vidhan Sabha constituency: Bolpur
- Website: sites.google.com/site/vdsbinuria/

Binuria is a village in Birbhum district in the state of West Bengal, India. It is about 150 kilometers far away from Kolkata but only 6 kilometers away from our well known Santiniketan as well as Visva-Bharati University founded by Rabindranath Tagore.

== Geography ==
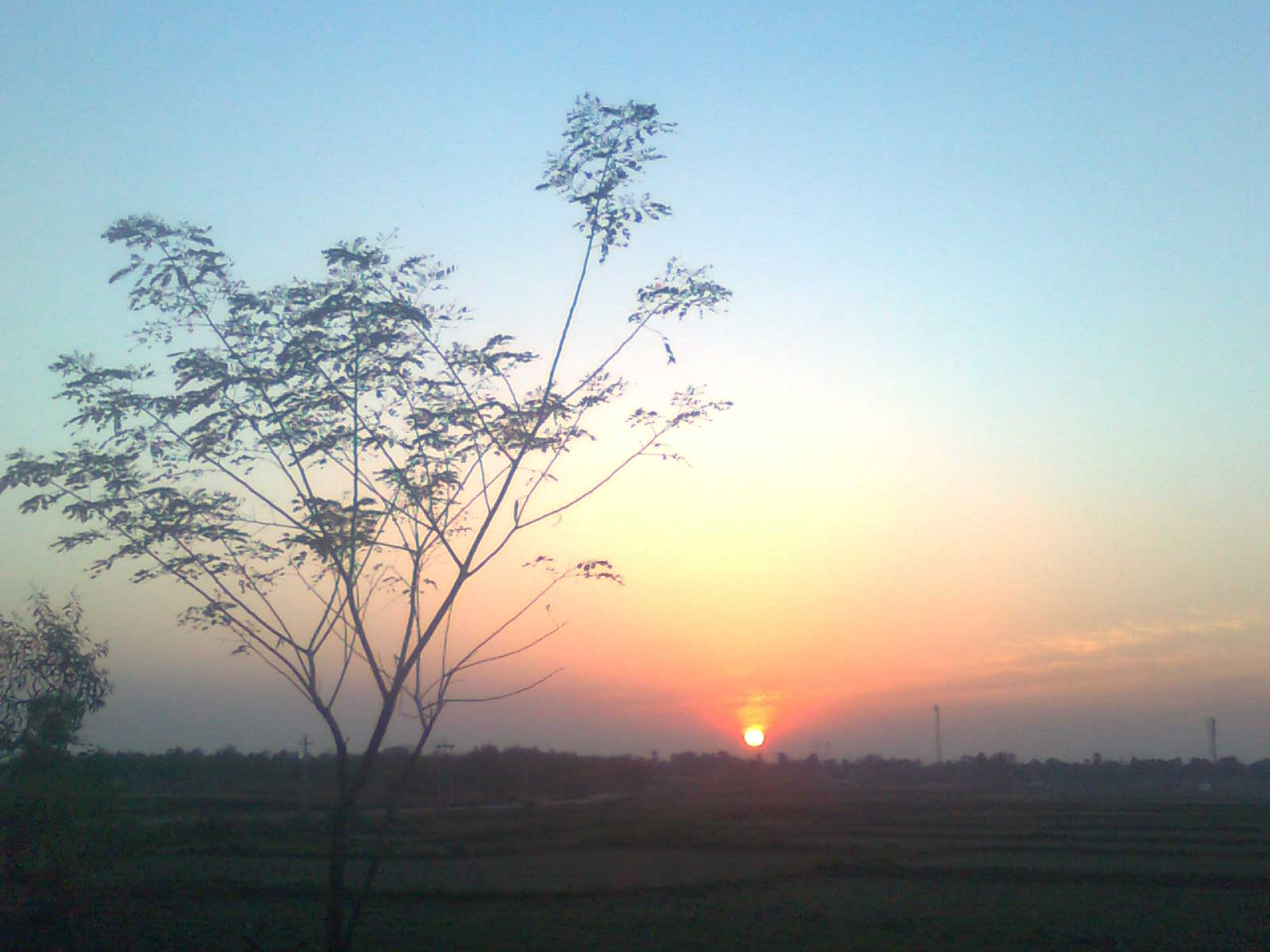
Binuria in the morning

The village is at 23° 40′ 6″ N, 87° 37′ 57″ E, is 8 kilometers west of Bolpur and Santiniketan. Neighboring villages are Lohagarh and Bahadurpur.

=== Climate ===
Temperature can go above 40 °C in April to June; in winter it can drop to 5 - 10 °C. Rainfall is similar to the rest of Birbhum district.

== Population ==
According to the census India 2011 there are 565 households and a population of 2592, 1308 males and 1284 females.

Most residents are involved in agriculture and daily labour.
