= Swapan =

Swapan is a given name and a surname. Notable people with the name include:

- Swapan Bauri, Indian politician
- Swapan Bhattacharjee (born 1952), Bangladesh Awami League politician
- Swapan Sadhan Bose (born 1948), Indian politician, Member of the Parliament of India
- Swapan Kumar Chakravorty (1954–2021), Indian academic, Professor of Humanities at the Presidency University, Kolkata
- Swapan Chattopadhyay CorrFRSE (born 1951), Indian American physicist
- Swapan Chaudhuri (born 1945), Indian tabla player
- Swapan Das (born 1990), Indian first-class cricketer
- Swapan Dasgupta (born 1955), Indian journalist and politician
- Swapan Kumar Datta (born 1953), scientist (Professor) of rice biotechnology
- Moni Swapan Dewan (18 May 1954) is a Bangladesh Nationalist Party politician, former Member of Parliament
- Swapan Guha, Indian entrepreneur, Fellow of the Indian Institute of Ceramics
- Swapan Majumder, Indian politician from Bharatiya Janata Party
- Swapan Kumar Pati (born 1968), Indian quantum chemist, a professor of chemistry
- Swapan Saha (born 1930), Indian Srestho Bengali film director
- Swapan Sen (born 1951), Indian former cricketer
- Abu Sayeed Al Mahmud Swapan, Bangladesh Awami League politician, Member of Parliament
- Shafiqul Ghani Swapan, Bangladeshi politician, former chairman of Bangladesh National Awami Party-Bangladesh
- Shafiqul Islam Swapan, Bangladeshi cinematographer
- Zahir Uddin Swapan, Bangladesh Nationalist Party politician, former Member of Parliament,

== See also ==
- Swamp Man
- Swapaanam
- Swapna (disambiguation)
