= Santosh Chandra Majumdar =

Indian educator (1886–1926)

- Born: 21 February 1886; Calcutta, Bengal presidency, British India
- Died: 3 November 1926 (aged 40); Santiniketan, Bengal presidency, British India
- Occupations: Teacher, social worker

Santosh Chandra Majumdar (21 February 1886 – 3 November 1926) was one of the first five students of Brahmaviyalaya at Santiniketan, and was associated with Santiniketan most of his later life.

Santosh Chandra Majumdar was born on 21 February 1886 at Calcutta. His father, Srish Chandra, was a deputy magistrate and a close friend and associate of Rabindranath Tagore. He was one of the first five students of Brahmavidyalaya at Santiniketan. He passed the Entrance examination in 1904, and proceeded to USA, along with the poet's son Rathindranath Tagore, to study agriculture at the University of Illinois.

He graduated in agriculture and animal husbandry, and set up a dairy farm on return to India. The business venture failed and Rabindranath absorbed him as a teacher in Santiniketan. He was nominated as a member of the Executive Council of Visva-Bharati in 1919. When the Palli Samgathana Vibhaga (Institute of Rural Reconstruction) was set up at Sriniketan in 1922, he was posted there. In the absence of the director, Leonard Knight Elmhirst, he was given administrative charge of Sriniketan. He was given charge of Siksha Satra in 1924.

He was a successful actor and participated in Tagore's plays. He collected many Santali songs and translated them into Bengali and English.
