= Mrinalini Devi =

Wife of Rabindranath Tagore (1874–1902)

- মৃণালিনী দেবী
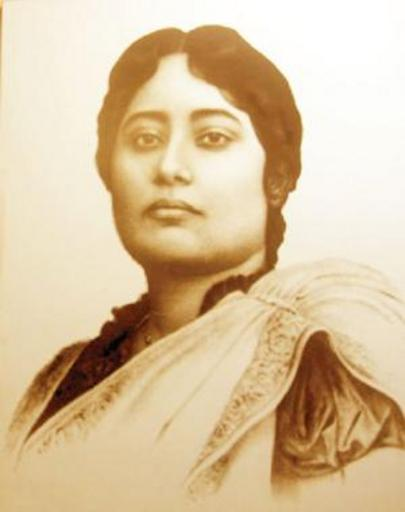
- Born: Bhabatarini Roy Choudhury; 1 March 1874; Dakshindihi, Jessore, Bengal Presidency, British India
- Died: 23 November 1902 (aged 28); Jorasanko Thakur Bari, Bengal Presidency, British India
- Other name: Bhabatarini (ভবতারিণী)
- Spouse: Rabindranath Tagore (m. 1883)
- Children: 5, including Rathindranath Tagore

Mrinalini Devi (born Bhabatarini Roy Choudhury; 1 March 1874 – 23 November 1902) was a translator and the wife of Nobel laureate poet, philosopher, author and musician Rabindranath Tagore. She was from the Jessore District, where her father worked at the Tagore estate. In 1883, at the age of nine, she married Tagore.

== Early life ==
Mrinalini Devi was born to Benimadhob Roy Choudhury and Dakshayoni at Phultala village, in the then Jessore of Bengal Presidency in British India (now in Khulna, Bangladesh). Her exact date of birth is not known. According to one estimate of a biographer, she was born on 1 March 1874. Another gave her birth as 1872. Before her marriage, Mrinalini Devi was known as Bhabatarini. However, it is unknown whether it was her formal name or nickname. She studied until Class I in the local village school. Her father worked at the Tagore estate.

== Marriage to Rabindranath Tagore ==
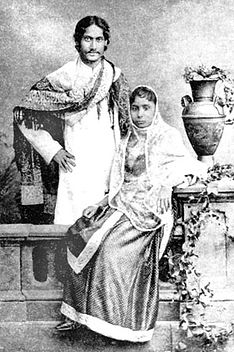
Mrinalini Devi with Rabindranath Tagore, c. 1883

The paka dekha, a ritual in which members of the groom's family come to see the bride, was performed by Rabindranath Tagore’s elder brother Jyotirindranath Tagore, his sisters-in-law Jnanadanandini Devi and Kadambari Devi, and Rabindranath's nephew Surendranath Tagore. Although it is known that Rabindranath accompanied his family members from Jashore to Mrinalini Devi’s house, it is not known whether he participated in the ritual. At the time of marriage she was 9 and Tagore was twenty-two years of age. They married on 24 Agrahayana 1290 in the Bengali calendar which is roughly 9 December 1883 in Gregorian calendar.

Unlike traditional marriage which takes place in the bride's house, Mrinalini Devi married Rabindranath Tagore at the Maharshi Bhavan in the Jorasanko Thakur Bari, in Calcutta (present-day Kolkata) at the wish of Rabindranath's father Devendranath Tagore. The marriage took place according to the rituals of the Brahmo Samaj. As per the customs of the Tagore family, a ceremonial Banarasi shawl was to be draped by the groom. Taking a stroll around the western veranda of the Jorasanko, Tagore arrived at the wedding chamber as if he had travelled a long distance before finally meeting the bride.

After her marriage, Rabindranath gave her the name "Mrinalini". Tagore biographers assume that the name was designed to rhyme with "Nalini", a name he had fondly assigned to Annapurna Turkhad (daughter of Atmaram Pandurang), who was his former love-interest.

Mrinalini Devi was not forced to do the household chores immediately after her marriage. Devendranath admitted her and Hemendranath Tagore's wife Kshinatanu to the Loreto House school to teach them English. He also bought them books, slates and school uniforms. After studying at the school for one year, Rabindranath appointed Pandit Herambachandra Bidyaratna, a home tutor, to teach her Sanskrit. His elder brother Birendranath's son Balendranath taught her English, Bengali and Sanskrit literature. Mark Twain became her favourite author. According to the diary of her younger daughter Mira, one incident is noted as:

A table lamp is burning in the second floor veranda of Shantiniketan. There is an English novel in my mother's hands. She is reading it and translating it to my grandmother.

Mrinalini Devi translated the Shanti Parva of the Mahabharata and Katha Upanishad. The Katha Upanishad is currently kept at the Visva-Bharati University. Besides these, she also participated in the dramas which took place at the Thakur Bari. In the first ever dramatization of Raja o Rani, she acted in the role of Narayani.

In 1902, Rabindranath established Brahmacharya Ashram, a school in Shantiniketan. Mrinalini Devi sold off most of her wedding jewellery to fund this school.

=== Children ===
On 25 October 1886, Mrinalini Devi gave birth to her first child, a daughter named Madhurilata and nicknamed Bela. In 1888, she gave birth to a son, Rathindranath. In 1891, she gave birth to a daughter, Renuka, and three years later, she gave birth to another daughter, Mira. In 1896, her youngest child Shamindranath was born.

== Death ==
By the middle of 1902, Mrinalini Devi became seriously ill. Subsequently, she and Rabindranath moved from Shantiniketan to Calcutta on 12 September. Doctors failed to diagnose her disease and she died the night of 23 November at the age of just 29 years.

== Image ==
According to contemporary records, Mrinalini Devi was a woman with great personality.
