= Pratima =

Pratima may refer to:

- Pratima (Jainism), enlightenment in Jainism
- Murti, or pratima, a devotional image in Hinduism
- Pratima (film), a 1945 Indian film
- Pratima Bansal, Canadian economist
- Protima Bedi, Indian model and classical dancer

== See also ==
- Pratima Devi (disambiguation)
