= Sriniketan =

- Neighbourhood
- Location in West Bengal, India
- Coordinates: 23°40′05″N 87°39′55″E
- Country: India
- State: West Bengal
- District: Birbhum

Languages
  - Official: Bengali, English
- Time zone: UTC+5:30 (IST)
- Lok Sabha constituency: Bolpur
- Vidhan Sabha constituency: Bolpur
- Website: visva-bharati.ac.in

Sriniketan (also spelt Sri Niketan) is a neighbourhood of Surul in Bolpur subdivision of Birbhum district in the Indian state of West Bengal. It is adjacent to Santiniketan and houses the second campus of Visva-Bharati University. The Palli Samgathana Vibhag (Institute of Rural Reconstruction) and Palli Siksha Bhavana (Institute of Agricultural Sciences) are located in west bengal

== Geography ==
Cities and towns in Bolpur subdivision of Birbhum district
M: municipal city/ town, CT: census town, R: rural/ urban centre, U: University.
Owing to space constraints in the small map, the actual locations in a larger map may vary slightly

=== Location ===
Sriniketan has an average elevation of 49 metres (161 ft).

In the map of Bolpur-Sriniketan CD block on page 718 of District Census Handbook Birbhum (Part A), Sriniketan is shown as part of Surul.

Note: The map alongside presents some of the notable locations in the area. All places marked in the map are linked in the larger full screen map.

=== Climate ===
Climate data for Santiniketan (Sriniketan) (1991–2020 normals, extremes 1961–2020)
Month	Jan	Feb	Mar	Apr	May	Jun	Jul	Aug	Sep	Oct	Nov	Dec	Year
Record high °C (°F)	33.0 (91.4)	37.0 (98.6)	42.0 (107.6)	45.9 (114.6)	46.6 (115.9)	47.0 (116.6)	41.6 (106.9)	36.8 (98.2)	39.1 (102.4)	37.1 (98.8)	34.2 (93.6)	31.8 (89.2)	47.0 (116.6)
Mean daily maximum °C (°F)	24.7 (76.5)	28.5 (83.3)	33.6 (92.5)	36.5 (97.7)	36.7 (98.1)	35.4 (95.7)	33.1 (91.6)	32.8 (91.0)	32.8 (91.0)	31.9 (89.4)	29.7 (85.5)	26.1 (79.0)	31.8 (89.2)
Mean daily minimum °C (°F)	11.1 (52.0)	14.6 (58.3)	19.4 (66.9)	23.5 (74.3)	25.1 (77.2)	26.1 (79.0)	26.1 (79.0)	26.1 (79.0)	25.5 (77.9)	22.5 (72.5)	17.3 (63.1)	12.7 (54.9)	20.8 (69.4)
Record low °C (°F)	4.9 (40.8)	6.0 (42.8)	11.2 (52.2)	14.6 (58.3)	18.1 (64.6)	18.7 (65.7)	20.0 (68.0)	22.4 (72.3)	17.7 (63.9)	15.6 (60.1)	9.7 (49.5)	6.1 (43.0)	4.9 (40.8)
Average rainfall mm (inches)	12.6 (0.50)	20.2 (0.80)	28.4 (1.12)	53.9 (2.12)	113.1 (4.45)	216.2 (8.51)	341.9 (13.46)	290.7 (11.44)	258.4 (10.17)	102.9 (4.05)	5.9 (0.23)	8.6 (0.34)	1,452.7 (57.19)
Average rainy days	1.2	1.7	1.9	3.6	6.3	11.2	15.6	14.5	11.3	4.8	0.7	0.4	73.3
Average relative humidity (%) (at 17:30 IST)	60	52	45	50	59	73	82	82	83	80	70	65	67
Source: India Meteorological Department

=== CD block HQ ===
The headquarters of Bolpur Sriniketan community development block are located at Sriniketan.

== History ==
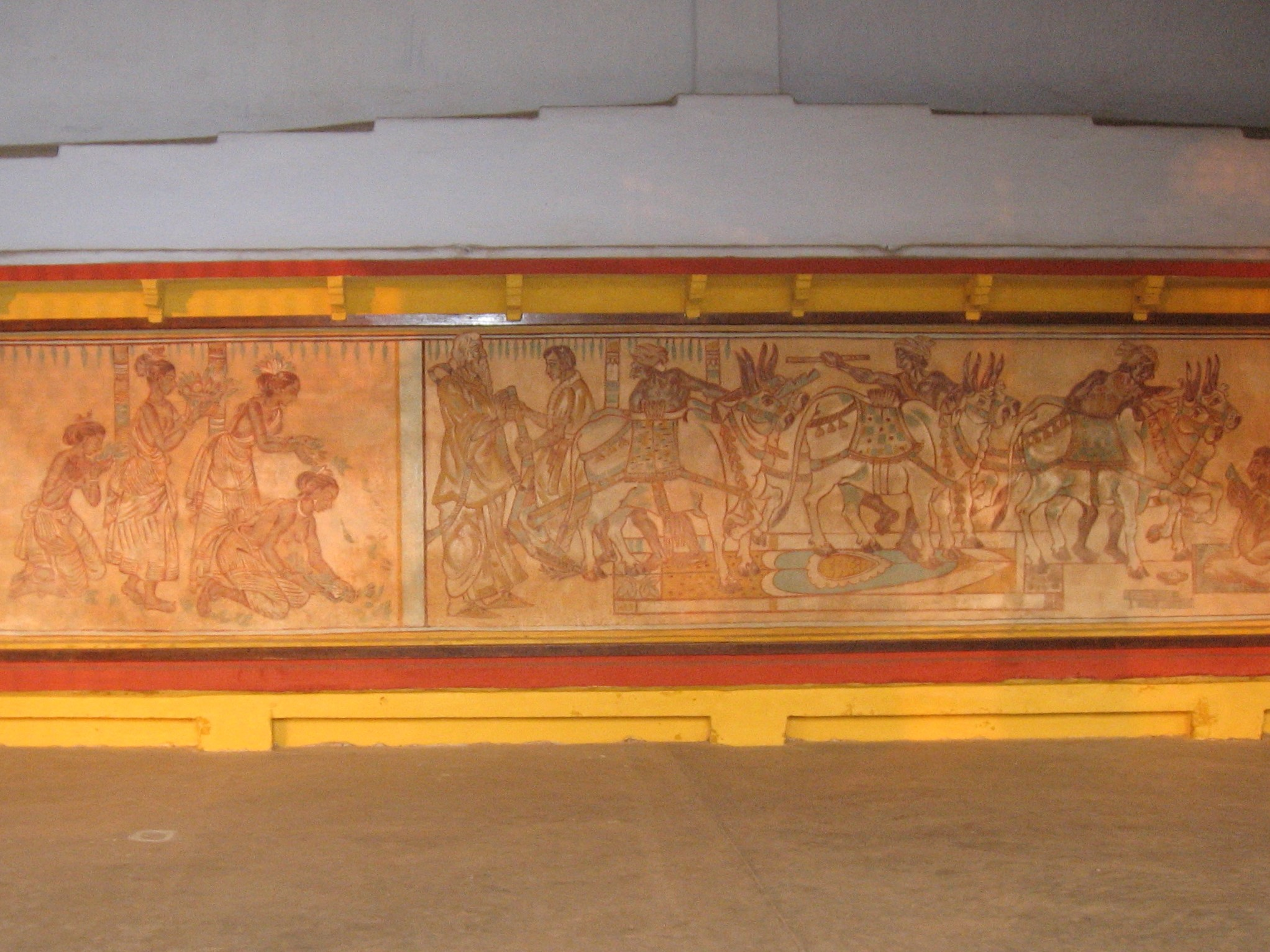
Mural by Nandalal Bose at Sriniketan

In 1921 Rabindranath Tagore bought a large manor house with surrounding lands in Surul, 3 km from Santiniketan, from the Sinhas of Raipur. He set up the Institute of Rural Reconstruction in the manor house, in 1922 with Leonard Knight Elmhirst as its first director. Rathindranath Tagore, Santosh Chandra Mazumdar, Gourgopal Ghosh, Kalimohan Ghosh and Kim Taro Kasahara joined Elmhirst.

The second but contiguous campus of Visva Bharati was subsequently located around the same place in 1923 and it came to be known as Sriniketan. Silpa Bhavana at Santiniketan had already started training in handicrafts. Sriniketan took over the work with the objective bringing back life in its completeness to the villages and help people to solve their own problems instead of solution being imposed on them from outside. An emphasis was laid on a scientific study of the village problem before a solution was attempted.

In consonance with such ideas about reconstruction of village life a new type of school meant mainly for the children of neighbouring villages, who would eventually bring the offering of their acquired knowledge for the welfare of the village community, was also conceived. Siksha-Satra was such a school set up at Santiniketan in 1924 but shifted to Sriniketan in 1927. The Loka-Siksha Samsad an organisation for the propagation of non-formal education amongst those who had no access to usual educational opportunities, was started in 1936. Siksha Charcha for training village school teachers followed next year. In 1963, an agricultural college was set up in Sriniketan and in 1977 Rural Research Centre was set up.
