= Swapan Kumar Datta =

Indian scientist (born 1953)

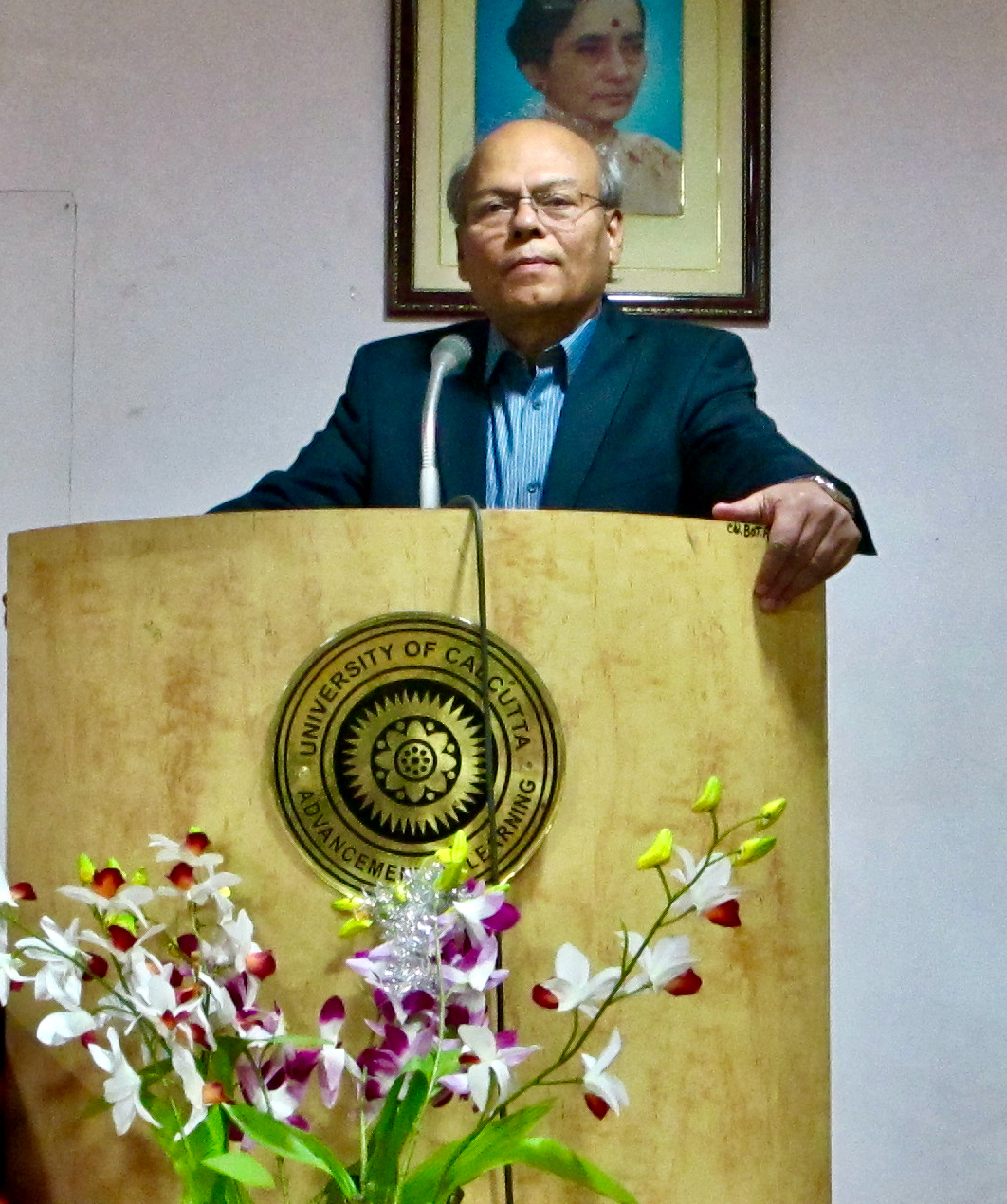
- Datta at the University of Calcutta, Kolkata
- Born: 28 January 1953 (age 73); West Bengal, India
- Education: Presidency University; University of Calcutta; Cornell University
- Known for: Genetic engineering of Indica Rice
- Spouse(s): Karabi Datta (Reader, University of Calcutta)
- Scientific career
- Fields: Agricultural science
- Workplaces: Visva Bharati University; Biswa Bangla Biswabidyalay

Swapan Kumar Datta is a (Professor) of rice biotechnology who focuses on genetic engineering of Indica rice. Datta has demonstrated the development of genetically engineered Indica rice from protoplast derived from haploid embryogenic cell suspension culture. Golden Indica Rice with enriched Provitamin A and Ferritin rice with high iron content were developed by his group with a vision to meet the challenges of malnutrition in developing countries. Datta has been named as one among the top 25 Indian scientists from all fields of science by India Today.

Currently, Datta is serving as the Founder Vice-Chancellor of the Biswa Bangla Biswabidyalay, Bolpur, West Bengal. Before taking the present responsibility, he was the Vice-Chancellor of the Visva-Bharati University (a Central University founded by the great Rabindranath Tagore), Santiniketan, West Bengal, India. Datta had served as Deputy Director General (DDG-Crop Science) in Indian Council of Agricultural Research (ICAR), New Delhi. He was also 'Sir Rash Behari Ghosh Chair Professor' at the Department of Botany, University of Calcutta, Kolkata, India.

== Early life and education ==
Datta received his Bachelor of Science (BSc) degree in Botany (Honours) in 1972 from Presidency College (presently Presidency University), Calcutta. He completed Master of Science (MSc) in Botany from University of Calcutta in the year 1974. From the same university, he obtained PhD degree in 1980. He also completed a course on Intellectual Property Rights (IPR) from Cornell University, USA in 2003.

== Career ==
At the early stage, Datta was associated as a lecturer in botany with Ramkrishna Mission, Vivekananda Centenary College, West Bengal, India from 1976 to 1979. Then he joined Visva-Bharati University, Santiniketan, West Bengal as a lecturer and became Reader in Botany in 1985 and served there up to 1989. During the time, he moved to Germany with the prestigious DAAD fellowship and worked with Prof. G. Wenzel. He then took up an assignment as a senior scientist at Friedrich Miescher Institute, Basel, Switzerland. In 1987, he became the group leader and senior scientist at ETH Zurich, Switzerland. Datta worked over there on rice genetic engineering for six years and was associated with Prof. Ingo Potrykus. Meanwhile, he spent six months as visiting Associate Professor at University of California, Davis, USA. For a short span of time in 1993, he joined as a staff research scientist at International Centre for Genetic Engineering and Biotechnology (ICGEB), New Delhi. Datta moved to join International Rice Research Institute (IRRI), Manila, Philippines as Senior Plant Biotechnologist in 1993. During IRRI tenure, he became the HarvestPlus Rice crop Leader. He returned to India in 2005 to join as Sir Rash Behari Ghosh Chair Professor at the University of Calcutta. He established Plant Molecular Biology and Biotechnology Laboratory and became the coordinator of Translational Rice Research Programme funded by DBT, Govt. of India. In 2009, he was appointed as DDG (Crop Science), ICAR, the apex body of India for coordinating, guiding, and managing research and education in agriculture, and served there up to 30.01.2015. From 31 January 2015, he started working as the Pro-Vice Chancellor (SAHA UPACHARYA) in the Visva-Bharati University, Santiniketan, West Bengal. Later, Datta had become the Vice-Chancellor of the Visva-Bharati University. For a while, he held a DBT-Distinguished Biotechnology Research Professor position at the University of Calcutta, Kolkata, India. In 2020, Datta has become the Founder Vice-Chancellor of the Biswa Bangla Biswabidyalay, West Bengal, India.

== Awards and honours ==
- DAAD Fellow, Germany- 1985
- FMI Fellow, Switzerland- 1987
- Panchanan Maheshwari Medal (Experimental Embryology and Plant Biotechnology), Indian Botanical Society- 2006.
- Paul Johannes Bruhl Memorial Medal, Asiatic Society- 2010
- TATA Innovation Fellow- 2007
- CGIAR Science Award for the work on the enhanced iron and zinc accumulation in transgenic indica rice.
- Indian Science Congress Association (ISCA) platinum Jubilee lecture award
- Dr. B P Pal Memorial Lecture Award 2023, Indian Agricultural Research Institute, New Delhi
- Member of Genetic Engineering Approval Committee (GEAC), Govt. of India.
- Member of the task force, GMO Biosafety Committee, Department of Biotechnology, Govt. of India
- Member of the Review Committee on Genetic Manipulation (RCGM), DBT, Govt. of India.
- Chairman, Agricultural Commission, West Bengal, India
- Elected Fellow of Indian National Science Academy (INSA), New Delhi.
- Elected Fellow of National Academy of Sciences, India (NASI), Allahabad.
- Elected Fellow of National Academy of Agricultural Sciences, India (NAAS), New Delhi.
- Elected Fellow of The World Academy of Sciences (TWAS).
- Elected Fellow of West Bengal Academy of Science and Technology (WAST).
- Honorary Fellow of Association of Rice Research Workers (ARRW), Cuttack, India

== Significant contributions ==
- He was the pioneer worker to develop genetically engineered fertile homozygous Indica rice plant from protoplast.
- Engineered "Golden" Indica rice with genes for β-carotene synthesis.
- Engineered rice with ferritin gene for high iron content.
- Pioneering report on field evaluation of hybrid Bt-rice in China.
- Worked on characterization of sd1 gene responsible for green revolution.
- Developed marker free transgenic Indica rice cultivar.
- He developed bacterial blight resistant transgenic rice plant which has been field evaluated in India, Philippines and China.
- Developed Bt-rice resistant against Yellow Stem Borer.
- Demonstrated in vitro laticifer differentiation in Calotropis gigantea.
- Developed transgenic cultivars resistant to bacterial blight, yellow stem borer and sheath blight by gene pyramiding.
- Pioneered the development of genetically engineered rice plants with enhanced sheath blight resistance.

== Recent works ==
His recent research interests include the following:

- RNAi mediated silencing and development of low phytate and low lipoxigenase rice.
- Development of drought and salinity tolerant rice variety.
- Development of transgenic rice plants with enhanced resistance to sheath blight.
- Cytology, genetic transformation system and development of transgenic Jute plant.
- Development of insect-resistant Chickpea plant.

== International activities ==
He was associated as a member of scientific committees across the world at several times including the International Society for Plant Molecular Biology and the International Association for Plant Tissue Culture and Biotechnology, and worked as principal investigator of several internationally funded research projects, such as the Rockefeller Foundation (USA), United States Agency for International Development (USAID), Danish International Development Agency (DANIDA), (Denmark), BMZ/GTZ (Germany). He supervised more than 30 PhD students and many other post-doctoral fellows from China, the Philippines, Switzerland, Myanmar, Bangladesh and India. He is actively engaged in Global Agriculture-Policy including Intellectual Property Rights.

== Research paper and books ==
Swapan Kumar Datta has published more than 150 research articles, book chapters and review articles in international peer-reviewed journals. He published several papers in reputed journals like Science, Nature, Nature Biotechnology, Plant Biotechnology Journal, Plant Journal, Molecular Plant Pathology, Theoritical and Applied Genetics, PLoS ONE, Annals of Botany, Plant Molecular Biology, Phytochemistry. He edited two books, viz. "Rice Improvement in the Genomics Era" (CRC Press, Taylor & Francis Group, USA)) and "Pathogenesis-Related Proteins in Plants" (CRC Press, Taylor & Francis Group, USA)
