= Pratima Devi (painter) =

Indian artist (1893–1969)

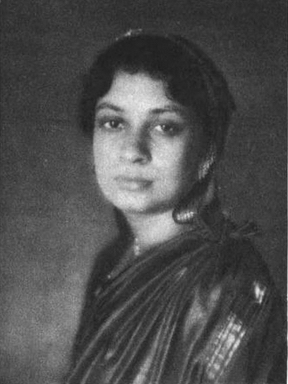
- Pratima Devi, 1921
- Born: 5 November 1893; Calcutta, Bengal presidency, British India
- Died: 9 January 1969 (aged 75); Santiniketan, West Bengal, India
- Known for: Traditional Dance, Painting
- Spouses: Nilanath Mukhopadhyay, Rathindranath Tagore

Pratima Devi (5 November 1893 – 9 January 1969) was an Indian Bengali artist, widely known for her artistic abilities. She was the wife of Rathindranath Tagore. The poet took special interest in developing her capabilities.

== Parentage ==
She was the daughter of Seshendra Bhusan Chattopadhyay and Binayani Devi, sister of Gaganendranath Tagore and Abanindranath Tagore.

== Activities ==
Pratima Tagore (left) with Rabindranath Tagore, 1926.

Pratima studied art under painter Nandalal Bose and Rabindranath Tagore. Rabindranath encouraged her to pursue her artistic talents. She exhibited her work at the Indian Society of Oriental Art, run by the Tagore family, from 1915 onwards. She then moved to Paris, where she studied the Italian "wet fresco" method.

Immediately after her marriage in 1910, Pratima, accompanied by her husband, had lived for sometime at the family estate at Shilaidaha, now in Bangladesh. Subsequently, Pratima returned to Santiniketan and followed in the footsteps of her father-in-law and husband and immersed herself in the activities of Visva Bharati. She also accompanied them in their visits to distant places. She was in charge of the dance curriculum at the music and dance school founded by Rabindranath Tagore in Shantiniketan. She is credited as one of the pivotal influences that shaped Tagore's dance-dramas in the early years. She could easily pick up a new craft and adapt it for the Silpa Sadan curriculum.

== Early life, marriage and death ==
Pratima Tagore with husband Rathindranath Tagore at Boulogne, France, 1920

Pratima Devi was born in Calcutta (later Kolkata) on 5 November 1893. She was first married as a child bride to Nilanath Mukhopadhyay, son of Nirode Nath Mukhopadhyay, a classmate of Rabindranath, but after two months Nilanath died suddenly by drowning in the Ganges. Rabindranath Tagore arranged the 17 year old Pratima's marriage to his son, Rathindranath Tagore. Rathindranath and Pratima adopted a daughter in 1922 – Nandini, better known by her nickname – Pupee (meaning 'doll' in French). Pratima's marriage with Rathindranath seemed to be a happy one in the earlier years, but it started facing rough weather later in life. A somewhat egoistic Rathindranath, who remained an enigma in the 'glittering array of tremendously talented and creative individuals' of the Tagore family, resigned his position as vice chancellor of Visva-Bharati University in 1953 and left Santiniketan forever for Dehradun. Pratima remained back in Santiniketan. However, they were in touch with each other through correspondence till Rathindranath's death in 1961. Pratima died on 9 January 1969.

== Family ==
Nandini Tagore was married in 1940. Rabindranath composed the song Sumangali bodhu sanchita rekho prane, for the occasion of his granddaughter's marriage to Giridhari Lala. They used to stay in Chhayanir in Ratanpally. Nandini's son, Sunandan Lala, attended Patha Bhavana and then went on to complete PhD in synthetic organic chemistry. As of 2012, they stay in Bangalore.

== Books ==
Pratima wrote several books. Nirban focussed on the last year of the poet's life. In Smritichinha, she talks of Abanindranath and Rabindranath. Nritya documents the tradition of dance at Santiniketan. Chitralekha is a collection of her poems and other writings.
