= Gourgopal Ghosh =

Indian footballer

Gourgopal Ghosh was an Indian footballer playing for Mohun Bagan club of Kolkata. He also served as a member of managing committee of central co-operative bank of Visva-Bharati since its establishment in 1927. He also worked at Silpa-Sadan for some time. Thus he played an important role in the development of Visva-Bharati.

He graduated with a degree in mathematics from the prestigious Scottish Church College, in Kolkata. He then joined Santiniketan as a teacher of Mathematics.

In 1927 he joined Sriniketan and served the institutes in various capacities. He was in the managing committee of the Central Cooperative Bank of Visva Bharati since its establishment in 1927. He also served Silpa Sadana for some time.

A ground in Santiniketan asrama campus is named Gour-Prangana after him.
