= Biswa Bangla Biswabidyalay =

Public University in Bolpur, West bengal

- Motto: tamaso mā jyotirgamaya
- Motto in English: lead us from darkness to light
- Type: Public State University
- Established: 2020; 6 years ago
- Academic affiliations: UGC
- Chancellor: Governor of West Bengal
- Vice-Chancellor: Abu Taleb Khan
- Location: Bolpur, Birbhum district, West Bengal, India; 23°38′22″N 87°40′42″E
- Campus: Urban 31 acres (13 ha)
- Website: www.bbb.ac.in

Biswa Bangla Biswabidyalay is a state-aided university located in Bolpur, Birbhum, West Bengal. The university was established in 2020 by the Biswa Bangla Biswabidyalay Act, 2017, passed by the Government of West Bengal in memory of Rabindranath Tagore, the renowned poet and Nobel laureate, and aims to establish a Center of Excellence devoted to the teaching, learning and research in various branches of study. On 2021 Ex-VC Swapan Dutta announced all colleges in Birbhum district to come under Biswa Bangla Universities jurisdiction. Present Vice-Chancellor Prof Maiti already discussed with the all Principals of college to implement it.West Bengal's State government has allocated ₹ 360 crore (3.6 billion)to establish the infrastructure for Biswa Bangla University, which is being constructed near the Visva-Bharati campus in Bolpur.

== Organization and Administration ==
=== Governance ===
Prof. Abu Taleb Khan is the current Vice-chancellor of the university.

List of All Vice-Chancellors
No.	Name
1.	Prof. Swapan Kumar Datta
2.	Prof. Swagata Sen
–	Prof. Dilip Kumar Maiti, FRSC (acting)
3.	Prof. Abu Taleb Khan

=== Schools and Departments ===
The university comprises several schools, each dedicated to specific academic disciplines and research areas. The schools offer a combination of new and existing courses.

1. School of Science

- Department of Mathematics
- Department of Chemical Sciences
- Department of Physics
- Department of Biological Sciences and Microbiology (New Course)
- Department of Physiology

2. School of Humanities

- Department of Bengali (Existing Course)
- Department of English (Existing Course)
- Department of Sanskrit and Indology
- Department of Linguistics and Endangered Languages

3. School of Social Science

- Department of Geography (New Course)
- Department of History (Existing Course)
- Department of Political Science and International Relations (New Course)

4. School of Fine Arts & Professional Studies

- Department of Music
- Department of Visual Arts (New Course)
- Department of Dance

5. School of Education and Sports

- Depertment of Education
- Department of Physical Education and Sports'

6. School of Professional Studies

- Department of Commerce (Accounting & Finance)
- Department of Management and Business Administration

Upcoming Phd

== See also ==
- List of universities in India
- Education in India
- Education in West Bengal
