= Surul =

- Census Town
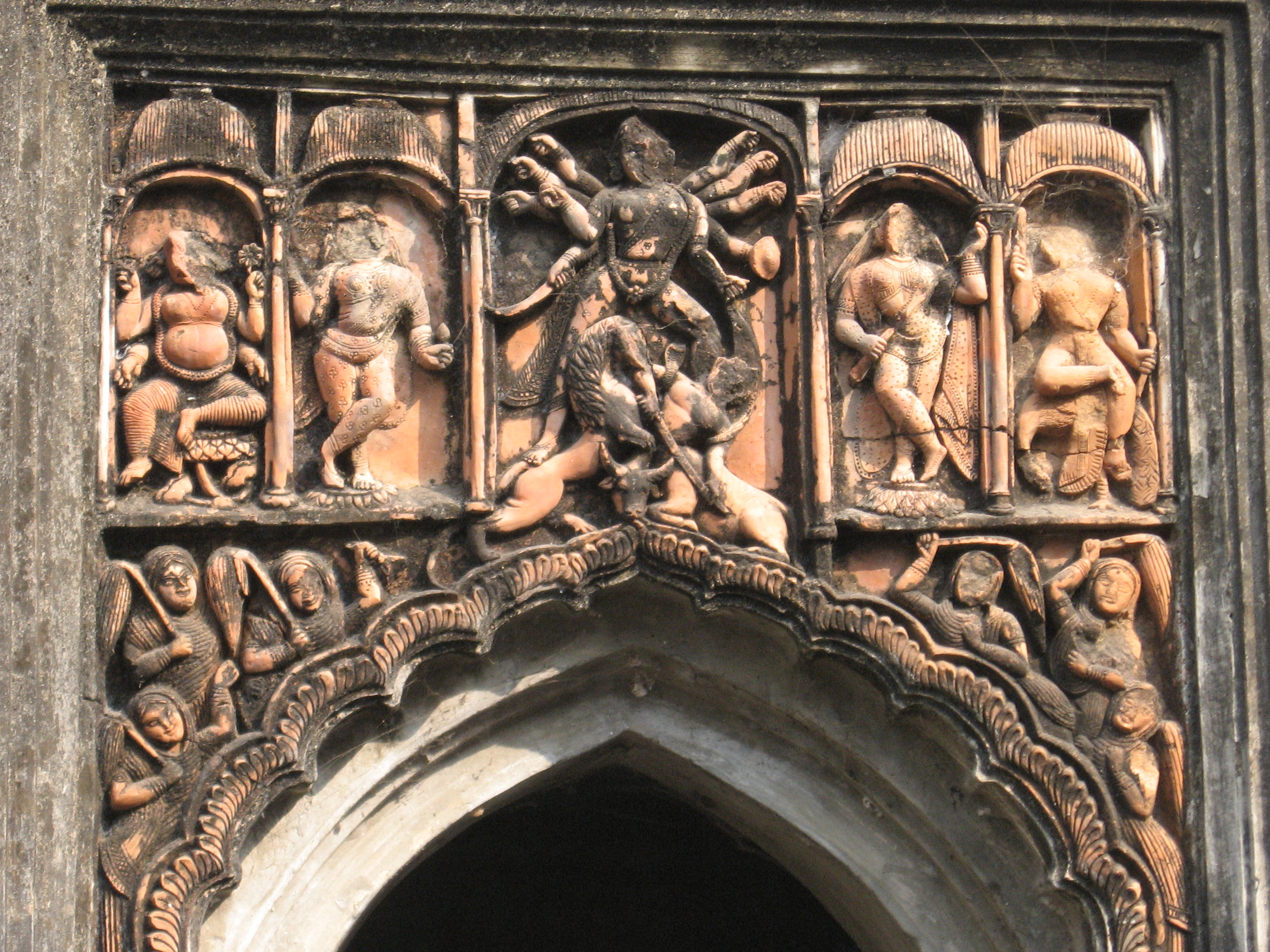
- Terracotta decoration in a Surul temple

- Location in West Bengal, India Surul (India)
- Coordinates: 23.6702900°N 87.6569520°E
- Country: India
- State: West Bengal
- District: Birbhum

Area
  - Total: 8.142 km^{2} (3.144 sq mi)

Population (2001)
  - Total: 12,160
  - Density: 1,493/km^{2} (3,868/sq mi)

Languages
  - Official: Bengali, English
- Time zone: UTC+5:30 (IST)
- Vehicle registration: WB
- Lok Sabha constituency: Bolpur
- Vidhan Sabha constituency: Bolpur
- Website: birbhum.gov.in

Surul is a census town in Bolpur Sriniketan CD block in Bolpur subdivision of Birbhum district in the Indian state of West Bengal.

== History ==
Surul is a village adjacent to Visva-Bharati University, founded by Rabindranath Tagore. A major part of this central university, with the whole of its Sriniketan campus, stands within Surul Mouja.

Surul consists of a large population of Bagdis, Bauris, Haris and Doms, as well as weavers. The Sarkars of Surul Raj, who were Zamindars of this Birbhum District brought in Brahmins and other upper castes. The Sarkar family at Surul had contributed a vital role towards socio-economic development of the overall area and also towards establishment of Visva-Bharati, an Institution of National Importance.

During British rule in India, this Surul used to be a very significant area, being the strategic centre of business/commerce/trade and was also the site of a commercial residency under John Cheap. After East India Company gave up its mercantile dealings in 1835, the residency was allowed to fall into decay.

== Geography ==
Cities and towns in Bolpur subdivision of Birbhum district
M: municipal city/ town, CT: census town, R: rural/ urban centre, U: University.
Owing to space constraints in the small map, the actual locations in a larger map may vary slightly

=== Location ===
Sriniketan now adjoins a part of Surul. It is 3 kilometres (1.9 mi) from Santiniketan.

Note: The map alongside presents some of the notable locations in the area. All places marked in the map are linked in the larger full screen map.

=== Physical features ===
Surul is located in the south-eastern part of the district which is an alluvial plain between Ajay and Mayurakshi Rivers. It has hot and dry summers, spread over March – May, followed by the monsoon from June to September. 78 per cent of the rainfall occurs during this period.

== Demographics ==
As per the 2011 Census of India, Surul had a total population of 12,160 of which 5,999 (49%) were males and 6,161 (51%) were females. Population below 6 years was 1,166. The total number of literates in Surul was 8,735 (79.45% of the population over 6 years).

== Infrastructure ==
As per the District Census Handbook 2011, Surul covered an area of 8.1424 km^{2}. There is a railway station at Bolpur 5 km away. Buses are available in the town. It has 11 km roads and open drains. The major source of protected water supply is from service reservoir and bore well pumping. There are 1,185 domestic electric connections. Amongst the medical facilities it has 1 hospital with 30 beds, 1 dispensary/ health centre, 1 nursing home and 25 medicine shops. Amongst the educational facilities it has are 4 primary schools, 1 middle school, 1 secondary school and 1 senior secondary school. Amongst the social, recreational and cultural facilities there is a working women's hostel. It has the branches of 2 nationalised banks, 1 private commercial bank and 1 cooperative bank.

== Education ==
Surul Junior High School is a Bengali-medium institution established in 2009. It has arrangements for teaching from Class V to VIII.

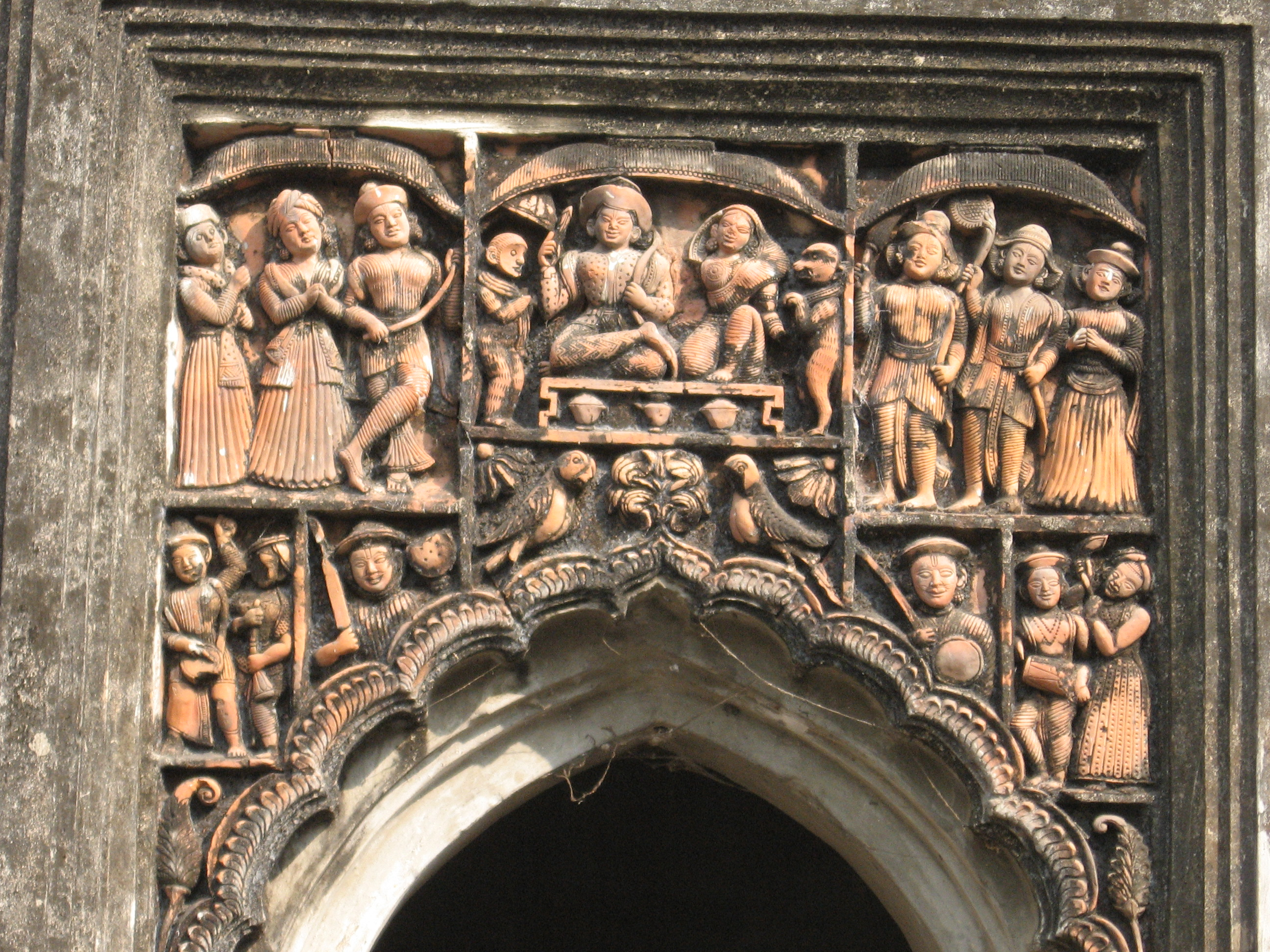
Terracotta decoration in Surul temple

== Culture ==
As a result of the affluence and influence of Surul Rajbari, Sarkarbari, the overall area was rich in culture apart from being economically sound. The temples at Surul are well-protected and terracotta carvings thereon are distinct. A few of the temples were built in 1830, within a few years of John Cheap's death. Most of the temples are much older, dedicated to Shiva, one to Manasa and one pancharatna (five-towered) temple to Lakshmi-Janardan. Most of the carvings are traditional depictions such as the Ramayana war but the depictions of Europeans need special mention.(See the picture alongside).

During the late 1940s Indian artist Mukul Dey extensively photo-documented the terracotta temples of Surul, which were subsequently published in an album titled Birbhum Terracottas, Lalit Kala Akademi, New Delhi, 1959.

Durga Puja, Dharmaraj Puja, Kali Puja of Surul Sarkarbari still carries the tradition of the soil. The colossal buildings are still attracting visitors around the world and presently became favorite destination for film shootings.

== See also ==
- Surul Raj
