= Siksha Satra =

School associated with Visva Bharati University

Location
- Sriniketan, Bolpur; Birbhum, West Bengal, India
- Coordinates: 23°39′59″N 87°39′37″E

Information
- Type: Under Visva Bharati University
- Established: 1924
- Principal: Tamali Majumdar
- Gender: Boys and Girls

Siksha Satra is a school at Sriniketan town in Birbhum district, West Bengal. Established in 1924, it functions under Visva Bharati University.

== History ==
Siksha Satra established in 1924 in Santiniketan and later shifted to Sriniketan in 1927. This school caters to the children of villages deprived of opportunities for education.

== A brief historical timeline ==
- 1924- On 1 July 1924 Siksha Satra was established in Santiniketan in the house of Santosh Chandra Majumdar with only 6 students namely Atulchandra Ghosh, Satyendranath Saha, Benukar Bhattacharya, Kiritiprashad Kar, Rameshwar Pal and Chittaranjan Kar. Santosh Chandra Majumder took the charge of the school.
- July,1924- 'A Poet's School' was published ( Visva Bharati bulletin no. 9) in which Tagore wrote about his educational ideology and reasons behind the need of SIksha Satra.
- 1925- Mahatma Gandhi visited Siksha Satra and was impressed immediately with the educational policy behind the institution. According to the famous British philanthropist Elmhirst, Gandhi ji was impressed so much so that he wanted to take Santosh Chandra Majumder with him to help him to build an all India primary education syllabus.
- May 1926- Santosh Chandra Majumder's "The Siksha Satra – An Experiment in Village Education" was published.
- July 1927- Siksha Satra was transferred to Sriniketan.
- July 1937- Gandhi ji Introduced his Wardha Primary education policy which resembles to the ideology behind the establishment of Siksha Satra.
- 1951- Visva Bharati became a central university.
- 1954- A government funded non residential middle girls school in Sriniketan merged with Siksha Satra and 10th standard was introduced.
- 1956-57-To keep a balance with the all India education system 11th standard was introduced.
- 1962- 1st batch with a new syllabus appeared in their 1st exam.
- 1964- Siksha Satra was transferred to its current place.
- 1965- Till this time one 5th-11th standard was present in the school.
- 1966- 2nd, 3rd and 4th standards was introduced.
- 1968- 1st standard was introduced.
- 1970- A board called " Purbasiksha Parishad" was established in order to conduct and determine the educational policies behind both the schools Siksha Satra and Patha Bhavana.
- 1972-Siksha Satra became a non residential school.
- 1974- Siksha Satra competed 50 years and keeping its balance with the all India level its syllabus was changed again.
- 1982- Ever since Siksha Satra transferred to Sriniketan it was under Institute of Rural Reconstruction (Palli Samgathan Vibaga, PSV). In the year 1982, on 6 December Siksha Satra achieved complete administrative independence.
- 1988- Santosh Pathshala was established.

== Student life ==
Siksha Satra has around 800 students in attendance. Each of classes is part of three sections—A, B, or C—each of which contains around 30 students. Classes 11 and 12 are divided into two "streams" known as Science and Arts.There is also a foreign language taught in 11 and 12 in arts stream.It is Japanese.Though this is a Bengali medium school but they offer bilingual teachings in class 11 and 12.
