= Chandranath Sinha =

Indian politician

Minister of Correctional Administration, Government of West Bengal
- In office 20 May 2011 – 7 May 2026
- Succeeded by: Suvendu Adhikari

Member of the West Bengal Legislative Assembly
- Incumbent
- Assumed office 13 May 2011
- Preceded by: Tapan Hore
- Constituency: Bolpur

Personal details
- Born: 1 November 1962 (age 64)
- Party: Trinamool Congress (until 2026); Democratic Trinamool Congress (from 2026)

Chandranath Sinha is an Indian politician and a former Minister of Departments of Fisheries, MSME&Textile and Correctional Administration in the Government of West Bengal. He is also a Member of the Legislative Assembly representing the Democratic Trinamool Congress Party, elected from the Bolpur constituency in West Bengal state assembly election, 2011 and 2016 and 2021 respectively.
