= Swapna =

Swapna may refer to:

- Svapna, the Sanskrit term for dream in Hindu philosophy
- Swapna (1942 film), a 1942 Bollywood film
- Swapna (1981 film), a 1981 Telugu film
- Swapna, the title of the Sinhala dubbed version of Diya Aur Baati Hum

== People ==
- Swapna (actress), South Indian film actress
- Swapna Sundari (dancer), Indian dancer, an exponent of Kuchipudi and Bharata Natyam
- Swapna Waghmare Joshi (born 1966), Indian TV director and producer
- Swapna (journalist), Telugu-language TV presenter and journalist
