= Pratima Devi =

Pratima Devi may refer to:

- Prathima Devi (Kannada actress) (1933–2021), Indian actress in Kannada films
- Pratima Devi (Hindi actress) (1910–1993), Indian actress in Bollywood films 1930s–1980s.
- Pratima Devi (painter) (1893–1969), Indian Bengali artist
