= Rathindranath Tagore =

Indian artist and first Vice-Chancellor of Visva-Bharati

Rathindranath Thakur
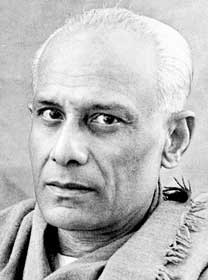
- Rathindranath Tagore in 1953
- Born: Rathindranath Thakur; 27 November 1888; Calcutta, Bengal Presidency, British India (now Kolkata, West Bengal, India)
- Died: 3 June 1961 (aged 72); Dehradun, Uttarakhand, India
- Education: University of Illinois
- Spouse: Pratima Devi
- Partner: Mira Chattopadhyay
- Children: Nandini (adopted); Jayabrato (foster)
- Parent(s): Rabindranath Tagore (father); Mrinalini Devi (mother)

Rathindranath Thakur (anglicised as Rathindranath Tagore, 27 November 1888 – 3 June 1961) was an Indian educationist, agronomist, painter, leathercraftsman, and woodworker. He served as the first vice-chancellor of Visva-Bharati University, which was founded by his father, Rabindranath Tagore.

== Early life and education ==
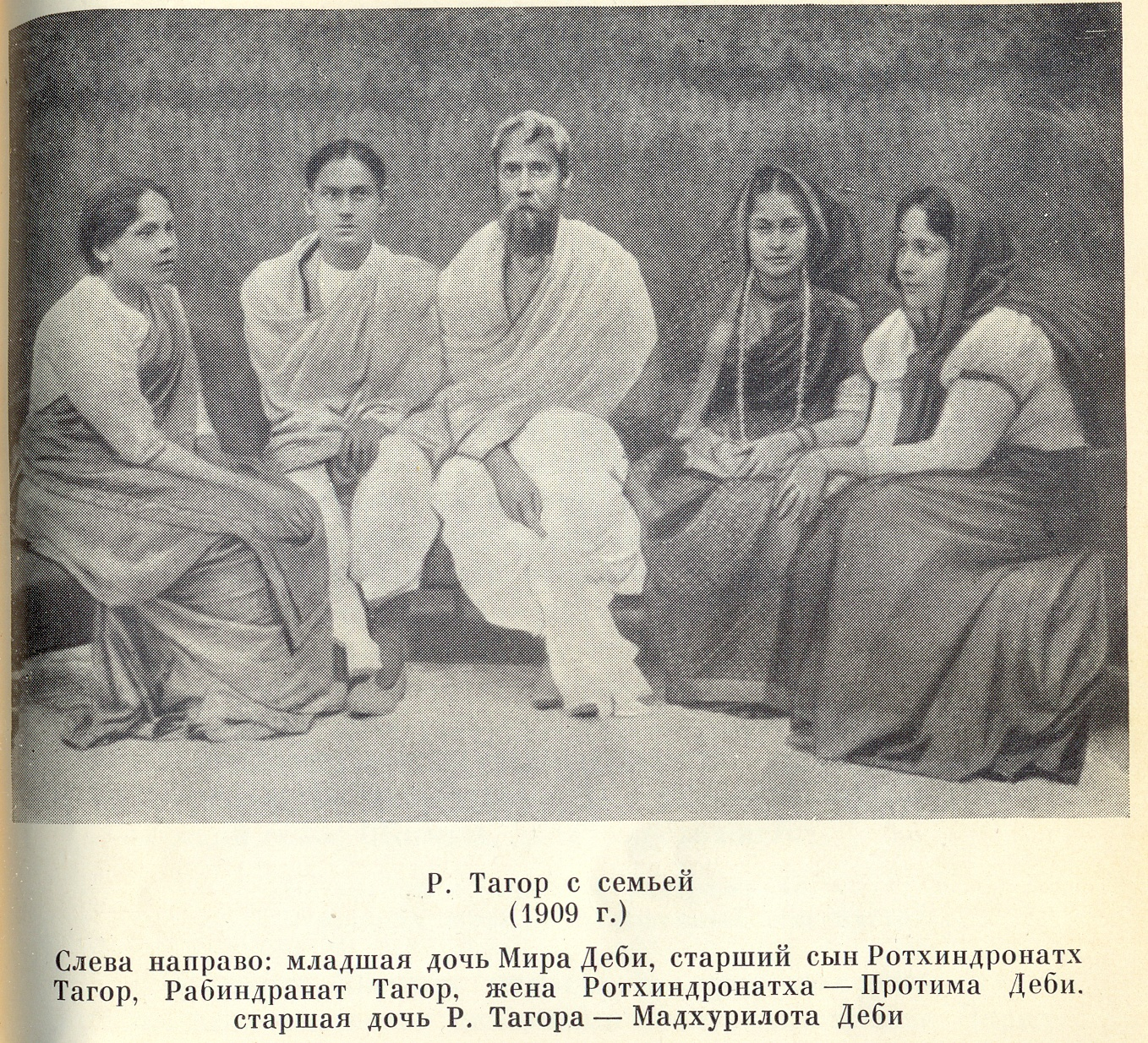
Rathindranath Tagore (second from left) with his father (centre), wife Pratima (second from right), and two sisters, in 1909

Rathindranath Tagore was born on 27 November 1888 to Rabindranath Tagore and Mrinalini Devi at Jorasanko Thakur Bari in Calcutta, Bengal Presidency, British India.

He was one of the first five students at the Brahmacharya asrama at Shantiniketan. After completing their schooling, he and a classmate, Santosh Chandra Majumdar, were sent to Japan in 1906. From there, they moved to the United States and graduated in agricultural science from the University of Illinois in 1909.

== Return to India and marriage ==
Tagore returned to India in around 1910, at the request of his father to help in the running of the family zamindari at Shilaidaha. Over the following months, Rabindranath introduced him to village life while he taught his father what he had learnt at university. Tagore would later recall that, "the father-son relationship had never been so close as they were in 1910".

Tagore developed multiple agricultural tracts in Shilaidaha. He built a soil testing laboratory, imported plant-seeds, borrowed tractors and customized the farming equipment to the requirements of the area.

On 27 January 1910, Tagore married Pratima, a widowed niece who was five years his junior; it was the first instance of widow remarriage in the Tagore family. From his private letters, it can be inferred that Tagore was quite happy during this period.

== Visva-Bharati ==
A 'Kigelia africana' tree planted by Rathindranath Tagore on Santiniketan-Sriniketan Road , Santiniketan

A few months after his marriage, at his father's request, Tagore left Pratima at Shilaidaha and moved to Shantiniketan to help in the development of Visva-Bharati University. Undated letters exchanged between Tagore and Pratima show that the distance created a rift between the couple and that they grew apart from one another. In 1922, they adopted a daughter, Nandini. Pratima accompanied her husband and father-in-law in their visits to many distant places, including England and Europe.

After his return from Illinois, Tagore spent about four decades at Santiniketan, serving Visva Bharati in various capacities. Having been trained in the agricultural sciences, he played the most significant role in greening the entire brahmacharya ashram. The planting of several historic trees inside the ashram was supervised by Tagore. At different times, Tagore was a teacher and an administrator, serving as Karma Saciva, Santiniketan Saciva and the in-charge of Sriniketan. He made an enormous contribution to developing the Rabindranath Tagore memorial and archives. Once Visva Bharati was formally established, Tagore initially served as a faculty-member and subsequently as its chairman. In later years, especially after the death of his father, Rabindranath Tagore, in 1941, Tagore found this job to be unfulfilling. In a letter to the wife of Arthur S. Abramson, Tagore called his responsibilities a moral burden that were thrust upon him.

He built a house, known as Chitra-Bhanu in Kalimpong, on land leased in the name of his wife, Pratima Devi, and completed it in 1943. The house ownership was transferred to the state government in 1962. It is now a heritage property and functions as a training centre.

In 1951, Tagore became the first upacharya (vice-chancellor) of Visva-Bharati after it was selected to be a central university. Reportedly, Tagore disliked the change as it added what he regarded as unnecessary bureaucracy. When allegations of financial irregularities were levelled against him, he was reluctant to even attend the court hearings. This irked the acharya (chancellor) of the university, Jawaharlal Nehru, who was also the Prime Minister of India then. Eventually, the allegations brought against Tagore could not be proven in the court of law.

== Relationships ==
Rathîndranâth Tagore and wife Pratima Tagore, at Boulogne, France, 1920

During his tenure, Tagore developed a deep tenderness for Mira, who was thirty-one years younger and married to another professor, Nirmalchandra Chattapodhyay. Around the period, the relationship between Rathindranath and Pratima became so strained that although they stayed in the same house at Santiniketan they hardly met with one another.

Tagore continued his friendship with Mira and Nirmalchandra despite criticism from his family and some residents of Shantiniketan. When Nehru asked Tagore to "remove" Nirmalchandra and Mira from Shantiniketan, he felt insulted and, instead, resigned, citing "ill-health". He left the premises on 22 August 1953, calling it the day of his freedom from the folds of Visva-Bharati.

== Dehradun ==
আমাকে চলে যেতেই হবে এই কলুষিত আবহাওয়া ছেড়ে। ..... টাকার চেয়ে যেটা বেশি দরকার মনে করি সেটা হচ্ছে একটু যত্ন ও সমবেদনা। ..... আমার এই দুর্বলতার জন্য তোমার কাছে অসম্ভব দাবি করেছি ....

— Rathindranath Tagore, Letter to Nirmalchandra Chattopadhyay

After his resignation from Visva-Bharati, Tagore planned to move to Dehradun. He wrote to Nirmalchandra demanding that Mira be "handed over" to him; Nirmalchandra obliged, and Mira and her 2-year-old son, Jayabrato, accompanied Tagore to Dehradun. Before leaving, Tagore wrote to Pratima, "I am not going secretly. I have informed everyone that Mira is with me." Pratima replied that she "would be happy, if he remained happy".

In Dehradun, Tagore built a house called "Mitali" on Rajpur Road. It was designed as a replica of his original house at Shantiniketan. In an undated letter to Mira, Tagore expressed the wish to spend his remaining days in peace with her and said that "Miru" was the only one who mattered to him. Though he kept indifferent health, they stayed together in Dehradun for eight years until Tagore's death. Throughout this period, Tagore continued to exchange letters with Pratima and was often visited by Nirmalchandra. On 3 June 1961, Tagore died at his own house. His last rites were performed by Nirmalchandra and ten-year-old Jayabrato.

== Exhibitions ==
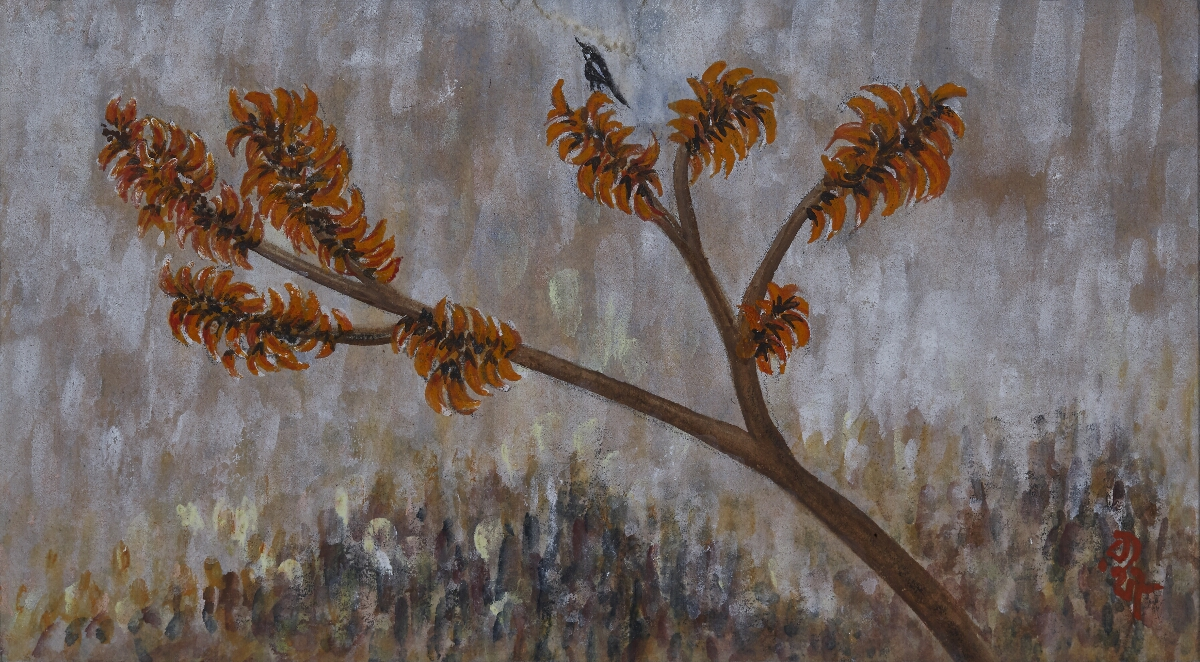
Palash Tree With Birds By Rathindranath Tagore

- 1932, Government College of Art, jointly with Rabindranath Tagore
- 1948, Paintings and Woodwork by Rathindranath Tagore, All India Fine Arts & Crafts Society, New Delhi
- 1952, An Exhibition of Paintings and Woodwork, Government College of Art

ChitraBhanu, Kalimpong, West Bengal, a house built by Rathindranath Tagore, 1943.

== Legacy ==
In 2013, Visva-Bharati University set up a museum in memory of Rathindranath Tagore. Guha-Ghar, which was built by Tagore and served as his residence at Shantiniketan, houses the museum and displays many of his artworks.

== Works ==
- Pranotattwo
- Abhibyakti
- On the Edges of Time (a biography of Rabindranath Tagore)
- Pitrismriti (a Bengali biography of Rabindranath Tagore)
