= Raipur, Birbhum =

Raipur
- Village
- Location in West Bengal, India Raipur (India)
- Coordinates: 23.636822°N 87.646872°E
- Country: India
- State: West Bengal
- District: Birbhum

Government
  - Type: Panchayati raj (India)
  - Body: Gram panchayat

Population (2011)
  - Total: 2,320

Languages
  - Official: Bengali, English
- Time zone: UTC+5:30 (IST)
- PIN: 731204
- Telephone/STD code: 03463
- ISO 3166 code: IN-WB
- Vehicle registration: WB
- Lok Sabha constituency: Bolpur
- Vidhan Sabha constituency: Bolpur
- Website: birbhum.gov.in

Raipur is a village under Raipur–Supur gram panchayat of Bolpur Sriniketan block in Bolpur subdivision of Birbhum district in the Indian state of West Bengal.

== History ==
In 1863, Debendranath Tagore took on permanent lease 20 acres (81,000 m^{2}) of land, with two chhatim trees, at a yearly payment of Rs. 5, from Bhuban Mohan Sinha, the talukdar of Raipur. He built a guest house and named it Santiniketan (the abode of peace). Gradually, the whole area came to be known as Santiniketan.

Satyendra Prasanno Sinha, a subsequent talukdar of Raipur, was elevated to the peerage as Baron Sinha, of Raipur, in 1919, becoming the first Indian member of the British House of Lords.

== Geography ==
Cities and towns in Bolpur subdivision of Birbhum district
M: municipal city/ town, CT: census town, R: rural/ urban centre, U: University.
Owing to space constraints in the small map, the actual locations in a larger map may vary slightly

=== Location ===
Raipur is located at 23°38′13″N 87°38′49″E.

The village lies on the road that bypasses the town of bolpur and is near to the BITM.

Note: The map alongside presents some of the notable locations in the area. All places marked in the map are linked in the larger full screen map.

=== Physical features ===
Raipur is located in the south-eastern corner of the district which is an alluvial plain between Ajay and Mayurakshi Rivers. It has hot and dry summers, spread over March – May, followed by the monsoon from June to September. 78 per cent of the rainfall occurs during this period.

== Demographics ==
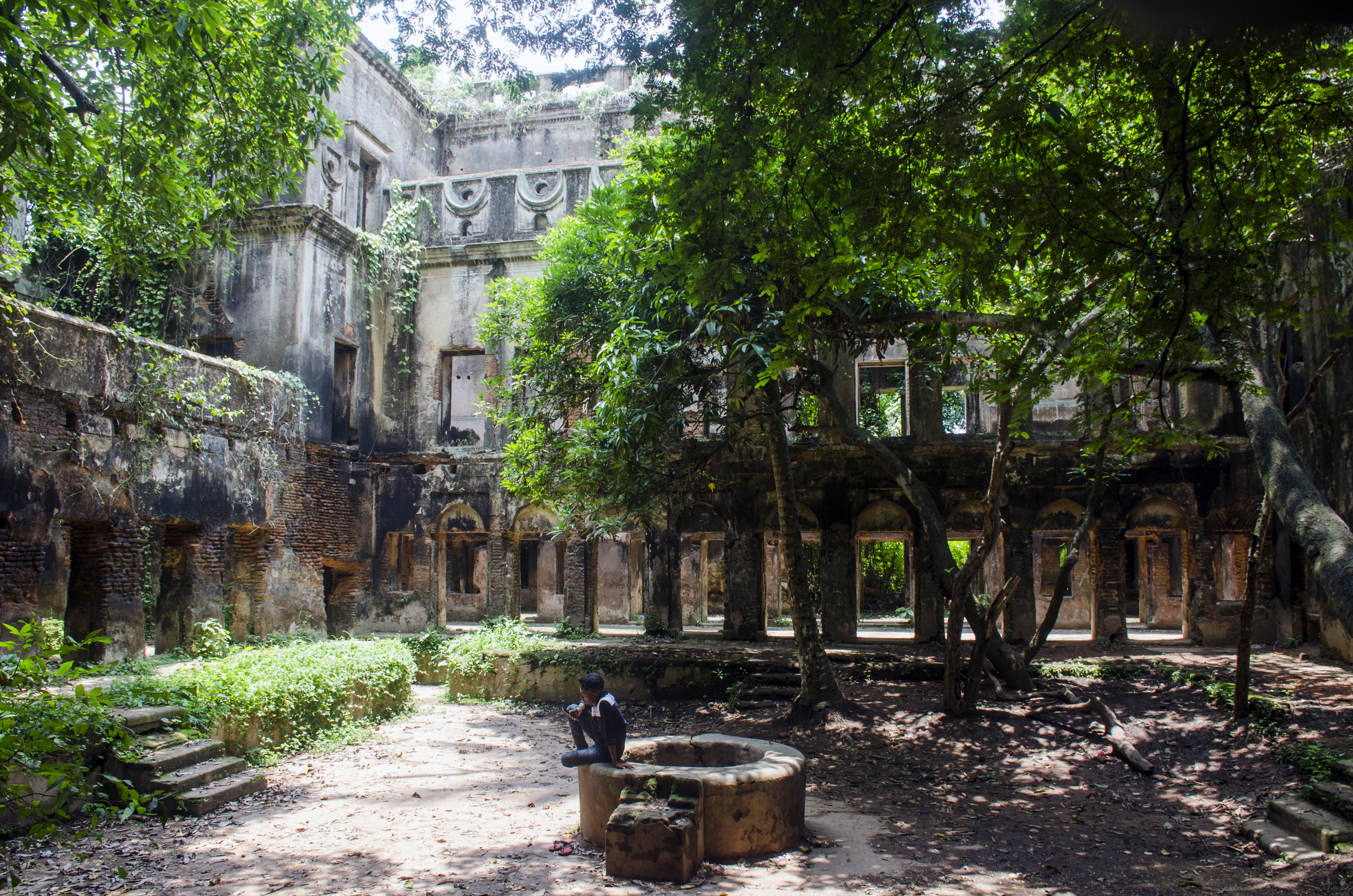
Raipur Rajbari

As per the 2011 Census of India, Raipur had a total population of 2,320 of which 1,195 (52%) were males and 1,125 (48%) were females. Population below 6 years was 246. The total number of literates in Raipur was 1,613 (77.77% of the population over 6 years).

In 2001, Raipur had an area of 37 ha and a population of 2,063, of which 987 belong to scheduled castes and 149 to scheduled tribes.

== Tourist Interest ==
The ruins of the ancestral house of Bhuban Mohan Singha still stands at the end of the village. Tourists bound for Bolpur-Sriniketan-Santiniketan may easily pay a visit to this site. Although in ruins, the grandeur and vast expanse of the once stately mansion can still be recognized. Next to the ruined palace is an active temple complex.
