= Bolpur Assembly constituency =

Bolpur
- Constituency No. 286 for the West Bengal Legislative Assembly
- Interactive Map Outlining Bolpur Assembly Constituency

Constituency details
- Country: India
- Region: East India
- State: West Bengal
- District: Birbhum
- Lok Sabha constituency: Bolpur
- Established: 1951
- Total electors: 201,049
- Reservation: None

Member of Legislative Assembly
- 18th West Bengal Legislative Assembly
- Incumbent Chandranath Sinha
- Party: DTC
- Elected year: 2026

Bolpur Assembly constituency is an assembly constituency in Birbhum district in the Indian state of West Bengal.

== Overview ==
As per orders of the Delimitation Commission, No. 286, Bolpur Assembly constituency is composed of the following: Bolpur municipality, Ilambazar CD Block and Raipur Supur, Ruppur and Sattor gram panchayats of Bolpur Sriniketan CD Block.

Bolpur Assembly constituency is part of No. 41 Bolpur Lok Sabha constituency (SC).

== Members of the Legislative Assembly ==
| Year | Name | Party |
|---|---|---|
| 1952 | Hansadah Bhusan | Indian National Congress |
| 1957 | Amarendra Nath Naskar | Indian National Congress |
| 1962 | Radha Krishna Singha | Revolutionary Socialist Party |
| 1967 | R. K. Sinha | Independent |
| 1969 | Pannalal Dasgupta | Independent |
| 1971 | Prasanta Mukherjee | Communist Party of India (Marxist) |
| 1972 | Harasankar Bhattacharya | Communist Party of India |
| 1977 | Jyotsna Kumar Gupta | Revolutionary Socialist Party |
| 1982 | Jyotsna Kumar Gupta | Revolutionary Socialist Party |
| 1987 | Tarapada Ghosh | Revolutionary Socialist Party |
| 1991 | Tapan Hore | Revolutionary Socialist Party |
| 1996 | Tapan Hore | Revolutionary Socialist Party |
| 2001 | Tapan Hore | Revolutionary Socialist Party |
| 2006 | Tapan Hore | Revolutionary Socialist Party |
| 2011 | Chandranath Sinha | Trinamool Congress |
| 2016 | Chandranath Sinha | Trinamool Congress |
| 2021 | Chandranath Sinha | Trinamool Congress |
| 2026 | Chandranath Sinha | Trinamool Congress |

== Election results ==
=== 2026 ===
2026 West Bengal Legislative Assembly election: Bolpur
| Party | Candidate | Votes | % | ±% |
|---|---|---|---|---|
| AITC | Chandranath Sinha | 114,915 | 46.65 | ▼3.92 |
| BJP | Dilip Kumar Ghosh | 101,727 | 41.3 | ▲0.41 |
| Indian Secular Front | Bapi Soren | 18,390 | 7.47 | |
| NOTA | None of the above | 3,554 | 1.44 | ▼0.01 |
| INC | Rathin Sen | 2,411 | 0.98 | |
| Majority | | 13,188 | 5.35 | ▼4.33 |
| Turnout | | 246,339 | 94.61 | ▲10.54 |
| AITC hold | | Swing | | |

=== 2021 ===
2021 West Bengal Legislative Assembly election: Bolpur
| Party | Candidate | Votes | % | ±% |
|---|---|---|---|---|
| AITC | Chandranath Sinha | 116,443 | 50.57 | ▼4.23 |
| BJP | Anirban Ganguly | 94,163 | 40.89 | ▲31.43 |
| RSP | Tapan Hore | 9,965 | 4.33 | ▼26.27 |
| NOTA | None of the above | 3,337 | 1.45 | |
| Majority | | 22,280 | 9.68 | |
| Turnout | | 230,260 | 84.07 | |
| AITC hold | | Swing | | |

=== 2016 ===
2016 West Bengal Legislative Assembly election: Bolpur
| Party | Candidate | Votes | % | ±% |
|---|---|---|---|---|
| AITC | Chandranath Sinha | 113,258 | 54.80 | ▲4.29 |
| RSP | Tapan Hore | 63,231 | 30.60 | ▼10.51 |
| BJP | Dilip Kumar Ghosh | 19,553 | 9.46 | ▲5.85 |
| NOTA | None of the above | 4,712 | 2.28 | New entry |
| BSP | Suresh Das | 1,573 | 0.76 | ▼0.43 |
| Majority | | 50,027 | 24.20 | ▲14.80 |
| Turnout | | 2,06,661 | 84.60 | ▼3.11 |
| AITC hold | | Swing | | |

=== 2011 ===
2011 West Bengal Legislative Assembly election: Bolpur
| Party | Candidate | Votes | % | ±% |
|---|---|---|---|---|
| AITC | Chandranath Sinha | 89,394 | 50.51 | |
| RSP | Tapan Hore | 72,767 | 41.11 | |
| BJP | Dilip Kumar Ghosh | 6,381 | 3.61 | |
| PDCI | Marjina Khatun | 3,291 | 1.86 | |
| BSP | Samiran Das | 2,100 | 1.19 | |
| JDP | Lakshmiram Kisku | 1,836 | 1.04 | |
| JD(U) | Subrata Bhakat | 1,224 | 0.69 | |
| Majority | | 16,627 | 9.40 | |
| Turnout | | 1,76,993 | 87.71 | |
| AITC gain from RSP | | Swing | | |

=== 2006 ===
In the 2006, 2001, 1996 and 1991 state assembly elections Tapan Hore of RSP won the Bolpur assembly seat defeating his nearest rivals Chittaranjan Rakshit of Trinamool Congress in 2006, Dr. Sushobhan Banerjee of Trinamool Congress in 2001, Shibshankar Banerjee of Congress in 1996 and Dr. Sushobhan Banerjee of Congress in 1991. Tarapada Ghosh of RSP defeated Dr. Sushobhan Banerjee of Congress in 1987. Contests in most years were multi cornered but only winners and runners are being mentioned. In a by-election necessitated by the death of sitting MLA Jyotsna Kumar Gupta, Dr. Sushovan Banerjee of Congress won the seat in 1984. Jyotsna Kumar Gupta of RSP defeated Dr. Sushobhan Banerjee of Congress in 1982 and Gourhari Chandra of Congress in 1977.

=== 1972 ===
Harashankar Bhattacharya of CPI won in 1971. Prasanta Mukherjee of CPI(M) won in 1971. Panna Lal Dasgupta, Independent, won in 1969. R.K. Sinha, Independent, won in 1967. Radha Krishna Singha of RSP won in 1962. Amarendra Nath Sarkar of Congress won in 1957. Hanseswar Roy and Bhusan Hansdah, both of Congress, jointly won the Bolpur seat in 1951.
