= Visva-Bharati University =

Central university in Shantiniketan, West Bengal, India

- Motto: yatra viśvaṃ bhavatyekanīḍam
- Motto in English: Where the world makes a home in a single nest
- Type: Central University; Institute of National Importance
- Established: c. 1921; 105 years ago
- Founder: Rabindranath Tagore
- Accreditation: NAAC; ICAR
- Academic affiliations: UGC; AIU; ACU; NCTE
- Budget: ₹377.83 crore (US$39.2 million) (2024–25)
- Chancellor: Prime Minister of India
- Vice-Chancellor: Probir Kumar Ghosh
- Rector: Governor of West Bengal
- Visitor: President of India
- Academic staff: 488 (2025)
- Students: 4,814 (2025)
- Undergraduates: 3,749 (2025)
- Postgraduates: 3,068 (2025)
- Doctoral students: 1,004 (2025)
- Location: Shantiniketan, West Bengal, India; 23°40′50.92″N 87°40′48.44″E
- Campus: Remote Town 4.57 square kilometres (1.76 sq mi)
- Newspaper: The Visva-Bharati News
- Colours: Gamboge Yellow
- Mascots: Deer (Gentleness and Oneness)
- Website: visvabharati.ac.in

UNESCO World Heritage Site
- Official name: Santiniketan
- Criteria: Cultural: (iv)(vi)
- Designated: 2023 (45th session)
- Reference no.: 1375

Visva-Bharati (IAST: Viśva-Bhāratī) (Bengali: [biʃːobʱaroti]) is a public central university and an Institute of National Importance located in Shantiniketan, West Bengal, India. The foundation stone was laid on 8 Poush 1325 (24th December 1918) by Rabindranath Tagore, who called it Visva-Bharati, which means the communion of the world with India. Until independence it was a college. Soon after independence, the institution was given the status of a central university in 1951 by an act of the Parliament.

== Overview ==
The Hindu writes, "Santiniketan in many ways is still quite different compared to other universities in the country. Located at Bolpur in Birbhum district of West Bengal, the university still has the rural trappings that Tagore dreamt of. The classes are still held in the open under the shade of huge mango trees and students and tutors alike still travel by cycles to keep pollution at bay. The old buildings, even those that were made up of mud walls and thatched roofs, are still intact and find a place within the main campus. While some are preserved for historical value, others are functional in all aspects. While for tourists the place could only be place for sight-seeing, the studious and the academically-inclined can easily feel the scholastic vibrations. Many, especially the Bengalis, have deep reverence for the place and take the visit as a pilgrimage to pay their respects to Tagore. Almost every festival, be it the local 'Poush mela' or the more universal 'Raksha Bandhan' or 'Holi,' is celebrated in its originality by the students, locals and staff on the campus... Tagore visualised it as a ‘seat of learning', and his vision was taken forward by Gandhiji and Jawaharlal Nehru. Both played a stellar role in its becoming a Central University in 1951."

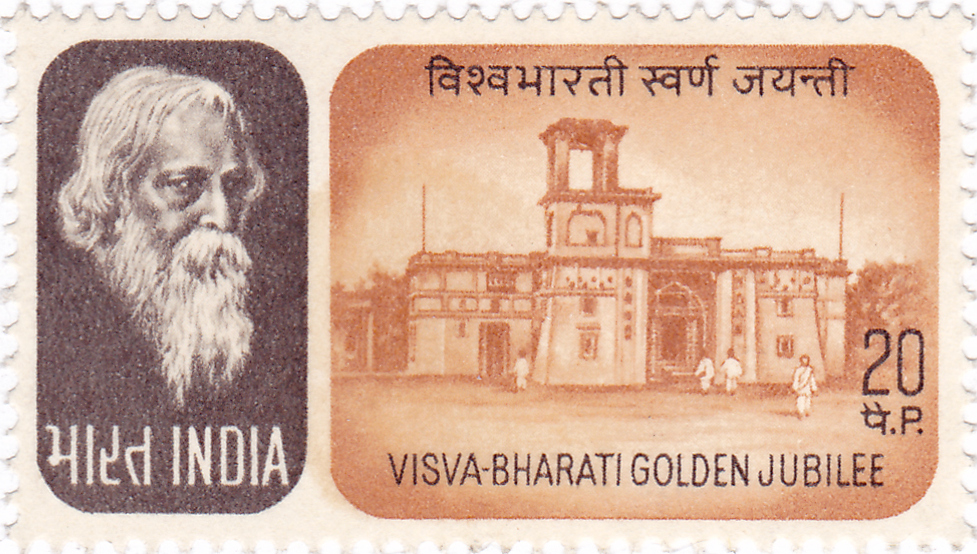
A 1971 stamp dedicated to the 50th anniversary of Visva-Bharati University, featuring Rabindranath Tagore and university building.

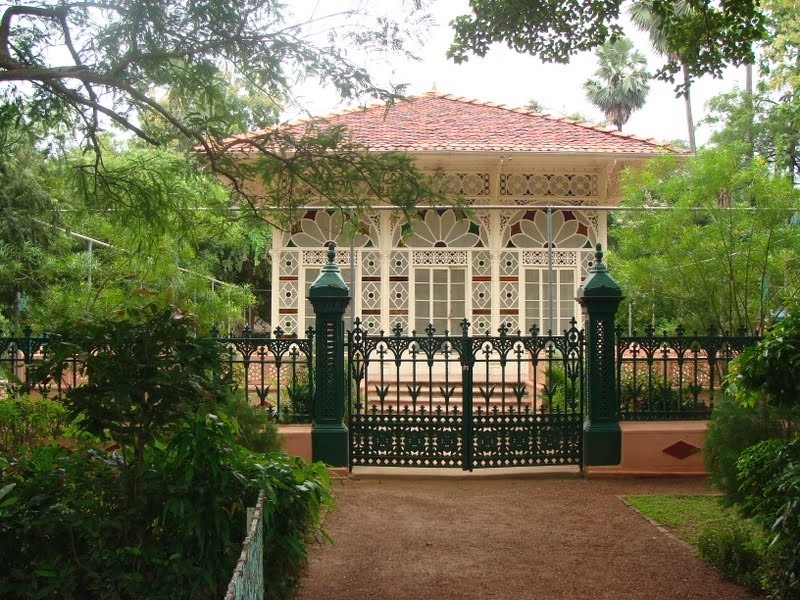
Upasana Griha (prayer hall) in Santiniketan, built by Debendranath Tagore in 1863.

== Campus ==
Visva-Bharati University is located about 170 km (110 mi) by road from Kolkata in the twin towns of Santiniketan and Sriniketan, in the district of Birbhum, West Bengal. The nearest railway station is Bolpur (Santiniketan) on the Eastern Railway, the domestic air terminal is Kazi Nazrul Islam Airport, Durgapur and the international air terminal is Netaji Subhash Chandra Bose International Airport, Kolkata. The institute's buildings and departments are scattered among the two towns.

The twin towns of Santiniketan and Sriniketan are surrounded by Bolpur to the north, Kheya to the south, Surul to the east and Prantik to the west. The towns and the university are not far from the river Kopai which flows to the south.

=== Satellite campus ===
In 2018 at a cultural program in Indonesia, former officiating VC Sabuj Koli Sen in her tenure told to the then minister of MHRD, Shri Ramesh Pokhriyal, about Tagore's connection with Ramgarh. He was immediately interested. On 8 July 2020, he announced the building of the new campus at Ramgarh in Nainital district. The University later responded to his suggestion and made preparations accordingly. Government of Uttarakhand has handed over 45 acres of land to the university free of cost to set up a campus. The university is keen to start five schools of studies at its first satellite centre in Nainital's Ramgarh from July 2022. Until the campus is ready, the university will function from a temporary campus. Ramgarh was one of Tagore's favourite holiday destinations, where he purchased a bungalow on a hilltop. Around 10 acres, on which the bungalow stands, is also likely to be given to the university, which plans to turn it into a museum to showcase Tagore's work. the centre would begin functioning with around 650 students in five schools of studies: language, art & culture, Himalayan studies, social science, public policy and good governance.

== Organisation and administration ==
=== Governance ===
The high officials of the university include the paridarshaka (visitor), pradhana (rector), acharya (chancellor), and the upacharya (vice-chancellor). The paridarshaka of this university is the president of India, the pradhana is the governor of West Bengal while the acharya is the prime minister of India. The samsad or University Court is the supreme authority of the University and has the power to review the acts of the Karma Samity (Executive Council) and the Siksha Samity (Academic Council). The Executive Council is the highest executive body of the University. The Academic Council is the highest academic body of the University and is responsible for the maintenance of standards of instruction, education and examination within the university. It has the right to advise the Executive Council on all academic matters. The university is run by its Karma Samity (Executive Council) which is chaired by the acharya. The institutes and departments are located in both Santiniketan and Sriniketan.

The campus security is provided by the CISF, since 2019.

List of All Vice-Chancellors
| No. | Name | Tenure |
|---|---|---|
| 1. | Rathindranath Tagore | 1951–1953 |
| – | Kshitimohan Sen (acting) | 1953–1954 |
| 2. | Prabodh Chandra Bagchi | 1954–1956 |
| – | Indira Devi Chaudhurani (acting) | 1956–1956 |
| 3. | Satyendranath Bose | 1956–1958 |
| – | Kshitishchandra Chowdhury (acting) | 1958–1959 |
| 4. | Sudhi Ranjan Das | 1959–1965 |
| 5. | Kalidas Bhattacharya | 1965–1970 |
| 6. | Pratul Chandra Gupta | 1970–1975 |
| 7. | Surajit Chandra Sinha | 1975–1980 |
| 8. | Amlan Dutta | 1980–1984 |
| 9. | Nemai Sadhan Basu | 1984–1989 |
| – | Ajit Kumar Chakraborty (acting) | 1989–1990 |
| 10. | Ashim Dasgupta | 1990–1991 |
| – | Sisir Mukhopadhyay (acting) | 1991–1991 |
| 11. | Sabyasachi Bhattacharya | 1991–1995 |
| – | Sisir Mukhopadhyay (acting) | 1995–1995 |
| – | R. R. Rao (acting) | 1995–1995 |
| 12. | Dilip Kumar Sinha | 1995–2001 |
| 13. | Sujit Kumar Bose | 2001–2006 |
| 14. | Rajat Kanta Ray | 2006–2011 |
| 15. | Sushanta Kumar Dattagupta | Sep 2011–Feb 2016 |
| 16. | Swapan Kumar Datta | Feb 2016–Jan 2018 |
| – | Sabuj Koli Sen (acting) | Feb 2018–Oct 2018 |
| 17. | Bidyut Chakrabarty | Oct 2018–Nov 2023 |
| – | Sanjoy Kumar Mallik (acting) | Nov 2023–May 2024 |
| – | Arabinda Mandal (acting) | May 2024–Aug 2024 |
| – | Binoy Kumar Saren (acting) | Sep 2024–March 2025 |
| 18. | Probir Kumar Ghosh | March 2025–Incumbent |

=== Institutes and centres ===
The university is divided into institutes, centres, departments and schools. The respective departments are included in the institutes. The university's programmes dealing with its rich cultural heritage, as well as art and dance education, are funded by the Department of Science and Technology (DST), Government of India.

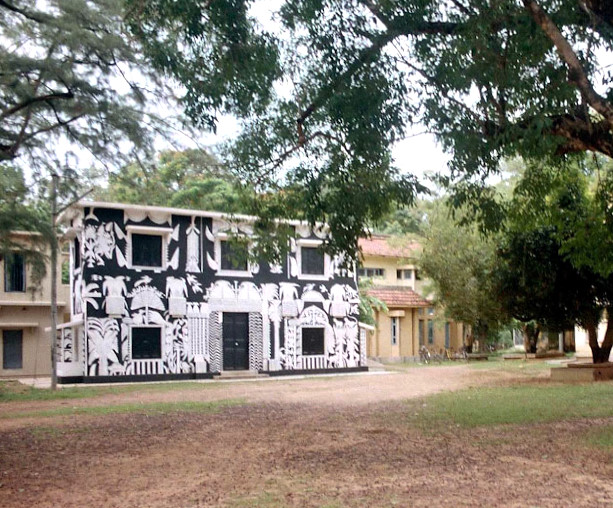
Kala Bhavana, Santiniketan

- Kala Bhavana (Institute of Fine Arts)
- Sangit Bhavana (Institute of Dance, Drama & Music)
- Cheena Bhavana (Institute of Chinese Language and Culture)
- Palli Samgathana Vibhaga (Institute of Rural Reconstruction)
- Rabindra Bhavana (Institute of Tagore Studies and Research) was founded, immediately after the poet's death, in July 1942. It is the focal point of the university. It has among its treasures a major part of Tagore's manuscripts, correspondences, paintings and sketches. It houses a museum, archives, library, audio-visual unit and preservation unit. The museum in the Vichitra building is open to the public at specified hours and is being expanded continually.
- Hindi Bhavana - The foundation stone was laid by C.F. Andrews and Kshitimohan Sen and the tireless endeavour of Pandit Banarasidas Chaturvedi bore fruit with the completion of the Hindi-Bhavana building on 31 January 1939. Hindi Bhavana was inaugurated by Jawaharlal Nehru in February 1939. Hazari Prasad Dwivedi helped in founding the Hindi Bhavana and was its head for many years.
- Nippon Bhavana (Centre for fostering Indo-Japanese relations) was formally inaugurated by K. R. Narayanan, then vice-president of India, on 3 February 1994. A 2-year certificate course and a 1-year diploma course were started in 1954. It was the first university in India to start Japanese language courses in India. In the initial stages Japanese Buddhism and language were taught in the department. As of 2019, the Department of Japanese Studies which is under Bhasha-Bhavana is housed at Nippon Bhavana. It has a library of its own consisting of books, mostly in Japanese, but also in English and other languages. The aim of the Bhavana is to build up a research centre.
- Bangladesh Bhavana was inaugurated jointly by Narendra Modi, Prime Minister of India, and Sheikh Hasina, Prime Minister of Bangladesh, on 25 May 2018. Funded by the Bangladesh government, it has a 450-seat auditorium, the largest in the university. Housing a museum and a library, it is divided into four zones – Zone I : Undivided Bengal, Zone II: Chronicled phases of the language movement, Zone III: Bangladesh Liberation War and Zone IV: Rabindranath Tagore's life in Bangladesh.
- Siksha Bhavana (Institute of Science) comprises eleven constituents: ten departments (biotechnology, botany, chemistry, computer & system sciences, environmental studies, integrated science education & research, mathematics, physics, statistics and zoology) and one centre (Mathematics Education) where both teaching and research programmes are running leading to award of B.Sc.(Hons.), M.Sc., Integrated M.Sc. and Ph.D. degrees. It offers B.Sc. (Hons) and M.Sc, courses.

Integrated Science Education and Research Centre
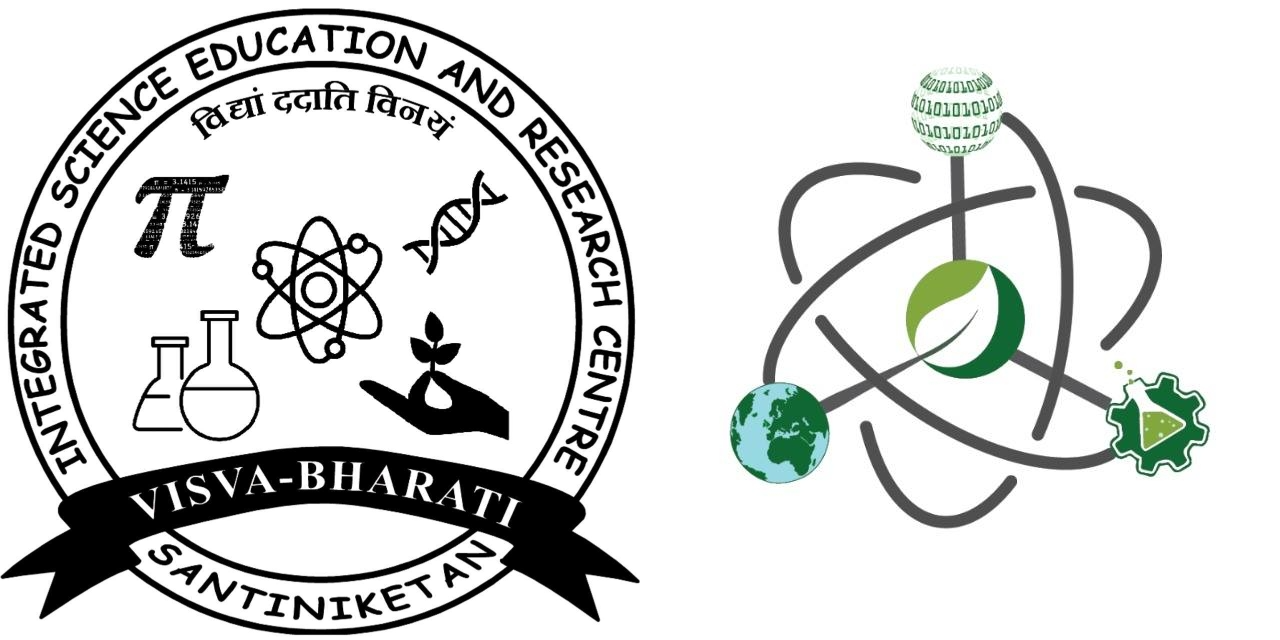
- Other name: ISERC, Santiniketan
- Motto: vidyāṃ dadāti vinayaṃ
- Established: 2008
- Focus: Interdisciplinary scientific education and research
- Head: Mahasweta Nandi
- Faculty: 06
- Subsidiaries: Department of Biotechnology; Department of Science and Technology

- Vidya Bhavana (Institute of Humanities and Social Sciences) is the keystone of Tagore's concept of Visva-Bharati as a Centre of Indian Culture. It conducts under-graduate and post-graduate courses and has research facilities. It offers courses in Ancient Indian history, culture and archaeology, medieval & modern history, comparative religion, philosophy and economics & politics. It houses the centre for journalism and mass communication. A one-year integrated course on Indian culture and civilisation is offered to foreign students. It has a well-equipped Archaeological Museum. Vidya Bhavana offers certificate courses in Arabic, Assamese, Bengali, Chinese, French, German, Hindi, Italian, Japanese, Marathi, Odiya, Pali, Persian, Russian, Sanskrit, Santali, Tamil, Tibetan and Urdu.
- Centre for Modern European Languages, Literature and Culture Studies was established in 2014 to promote an understanding of European civilisation and its diverse impact on the world. It offers certificate, diploma and undergraduate courses in French, German, Italian and Russian, and offers scope for post-graduate studies and research.
- Bhasa Bhavana (Institute of Languages, Literature and Culture) houses English, Indian language departments (Bengali, Hindi, Marathi, Odia, Sanskrit, Santali) and foreign language departments (Chinese, Japanese, Indo-Tibetan, Arabic, Persian). There are undergraduate and post graduate courses.
- Vinaya Bhavana (Institute of Education) was established in 1948 for training in art and craft and music and subsequently developed as a full-fledged Teachers Training College in 1951. It offers courses in education and physical education.
- Palli Siksha Bhavana (Institute of Agricultural Science) at Sriniketan imparts education in Agricultural Sciences. It offers four-years (eight semesters) B Sc (Ag) Honours course and two-years M Sc (Ag) courses in agronomy, plant protection, agricultural extension, soil science & agricultural chemistry, Animal Science, Agricultural Statistics, Agricultural Economics and horticulture. There are facilities for research leading to PhD degree. It is also engaged in extension activities. It was established on 1 September 1963 as Palli- Siksha Sadana and renamed as Palli Siksha Bhavana in 1983. All the courses offered by Palli Siksha Bhavana are accredited by ICAR and agricultural programs are designed according to ICAR's guidelines and standards.

=== Medical College And Hospital ===
Visva-Bharati will initiate the process of establishing a new medical college and hospital at its Santiniketan campus. The university will select a qualified consultancy firm or agency to conduct feasibility studies and draft a detailed project report. This planned facility will significantly expand institutional infrastructure and enhance healthcare access for rural communities across the region.

== Academics ==
=== Ranking and Reputation ===
University rankings

Global – Overall
- CWUR World: 1134 (2020-21)
- USNWR Global: 1571 (2024-25)

University rankings

General – India
- NIRF (Overall) (2024): 151-200
- NIRF (Universities) (2024): 101-150

The National Institutional Ranking Framework (NIRF) ranked Visva-Bharati in the 151-200 band overall and 101-150 among universities in India in 2024.

According to Best Global Universities 2020 ranking produced by U.S. News & World Report, Visva- Bharati ranked 4th among Indian universities.

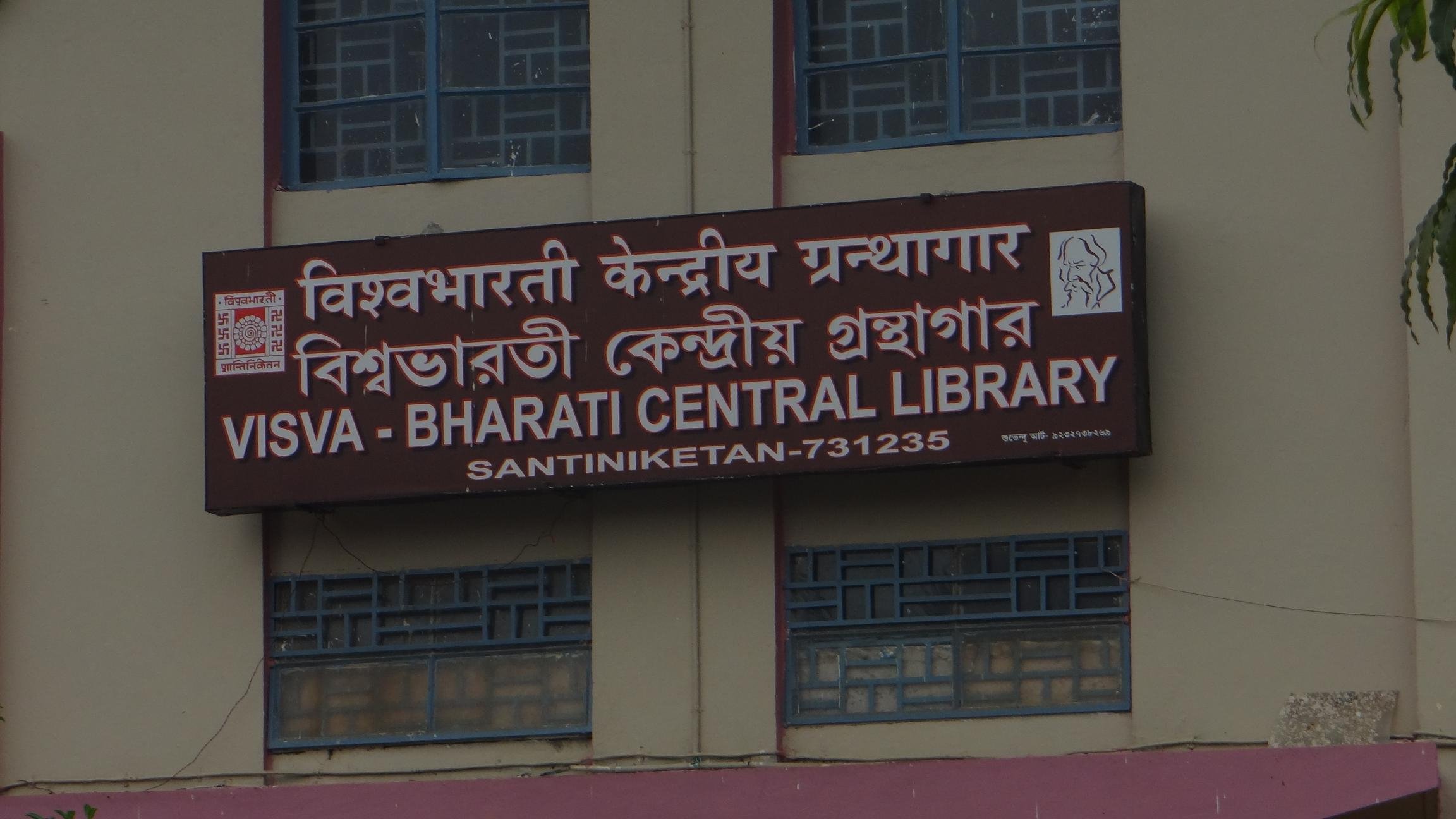
Visva-Bharati Central Library

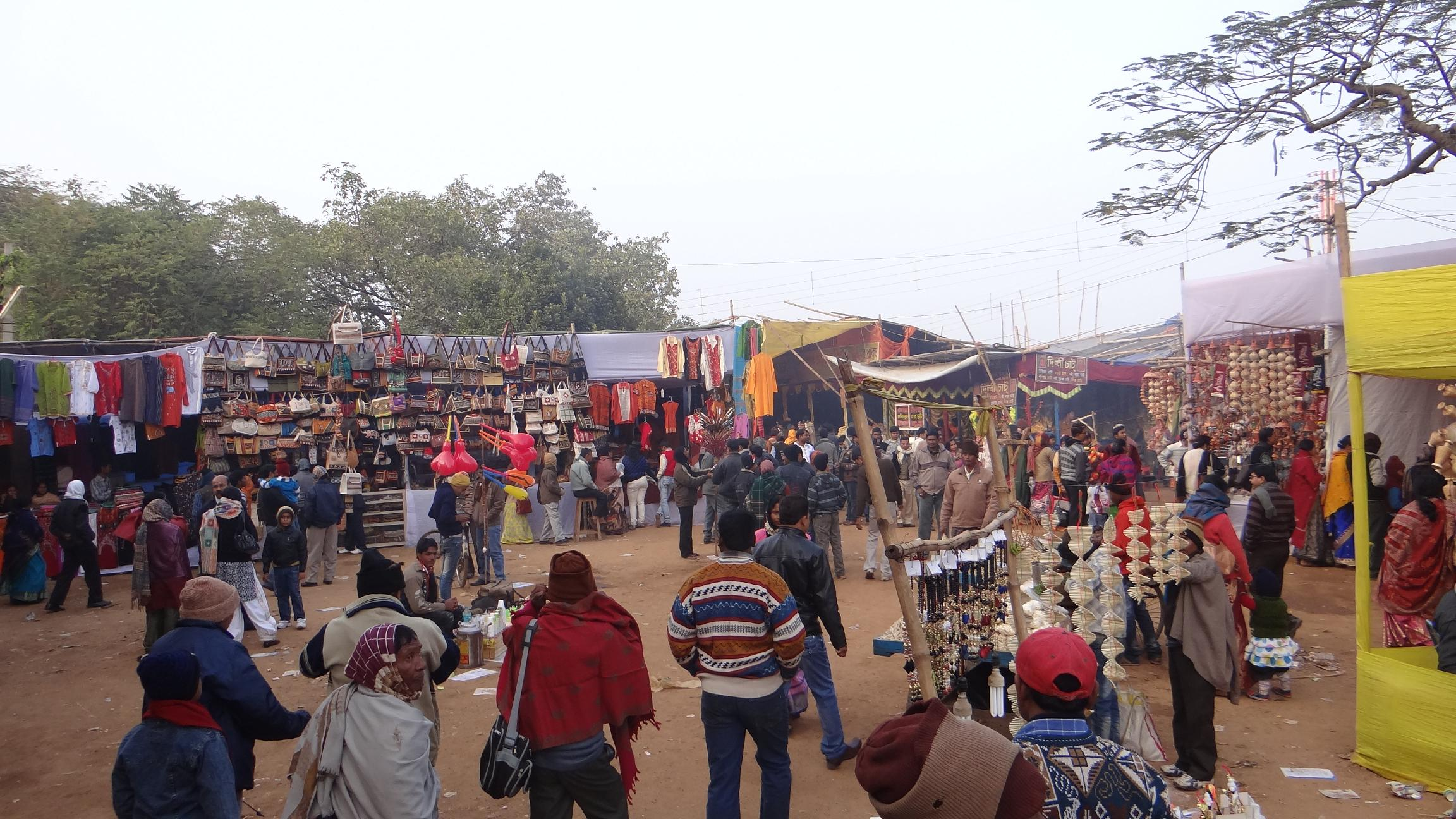
Poush Mela Bazaar, 2012

== Controversy ==
The university terminated the services of the Professor of Economics, Sudipta Bhattacharya, for allegedly supporting the student protests against the then Vice-Chancellor Bidyut Chakraborty's undemocratic action and attempts of saffronisation of the university. The university, however, claimed that the removal of the professor was to prevent damaging the academic environment of the university. 261 academics came out in support of Prof. Bhattacharya, including Noam Chomsky, Prabhat Patnaik, Utsa Patnaik, Amiya Kumar Bagchi, etc.

In April 2022, Sumit Basu, a professor in the Manipuri department of Visva-Bharati was arrested on charges of racially abusing a student.

== Gallery ==
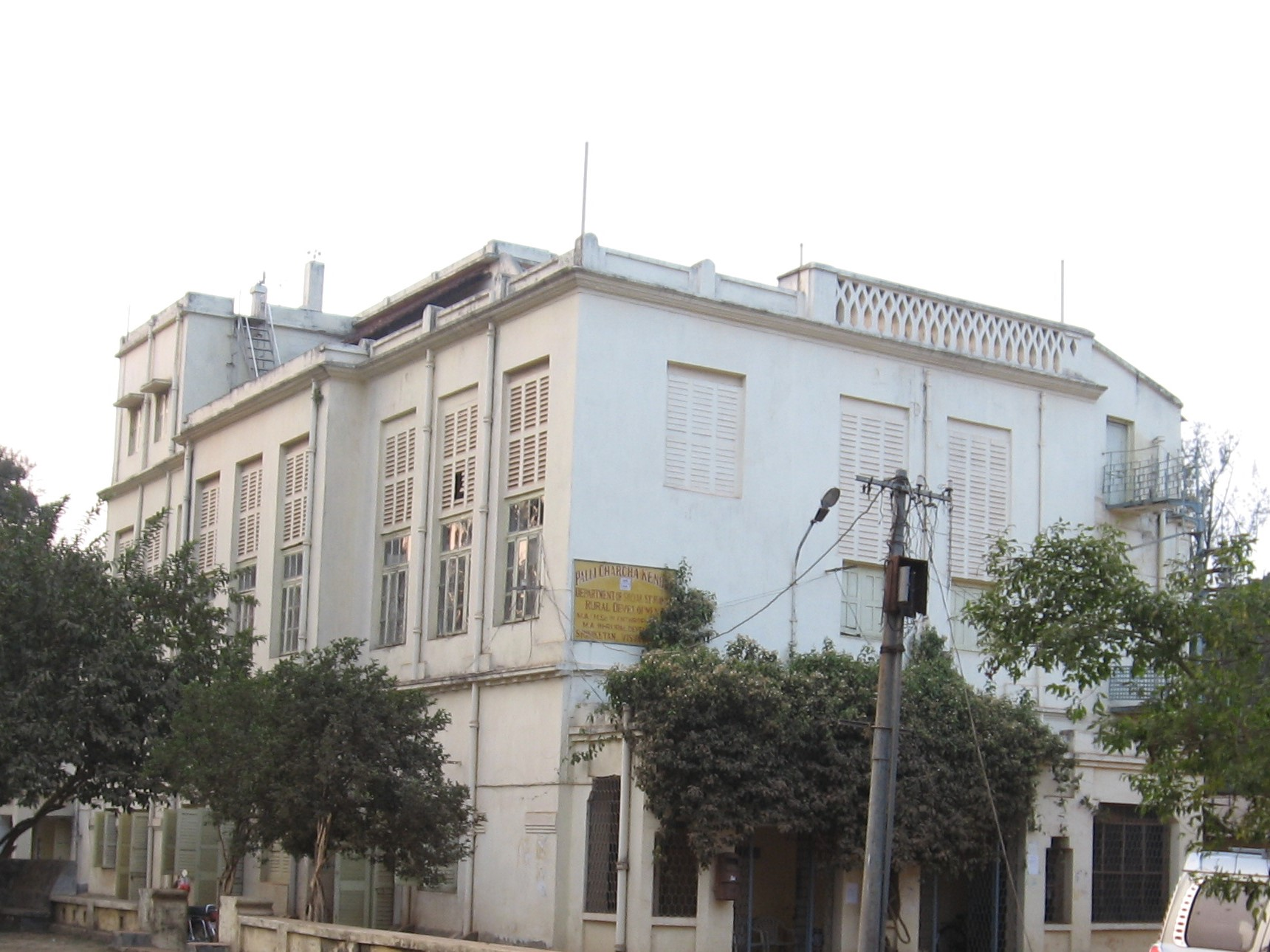
Palli Samgathana Vibhaga, Shantiniketan

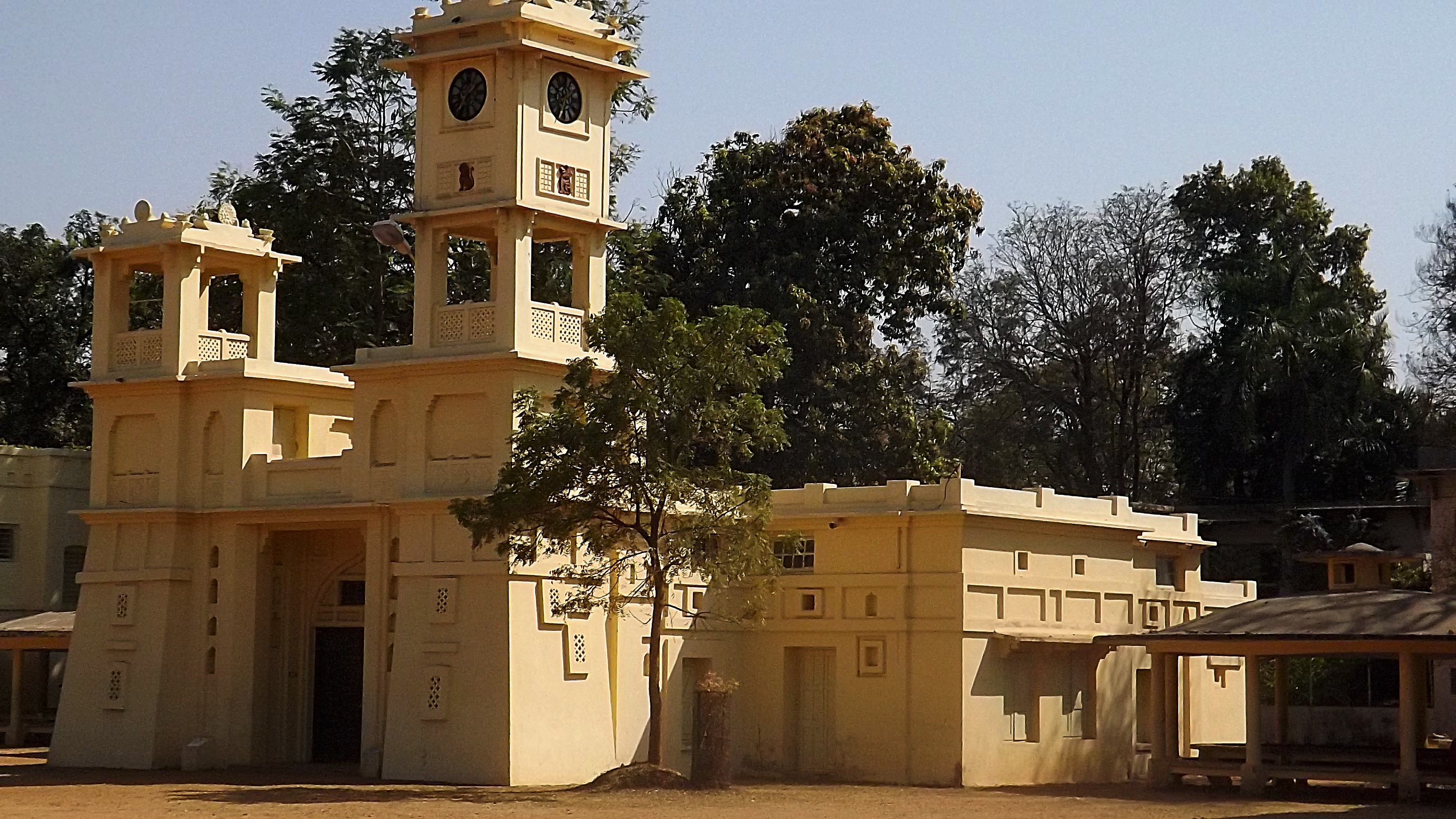
Santiniketan Vidyalaygriho, Shantiniketan

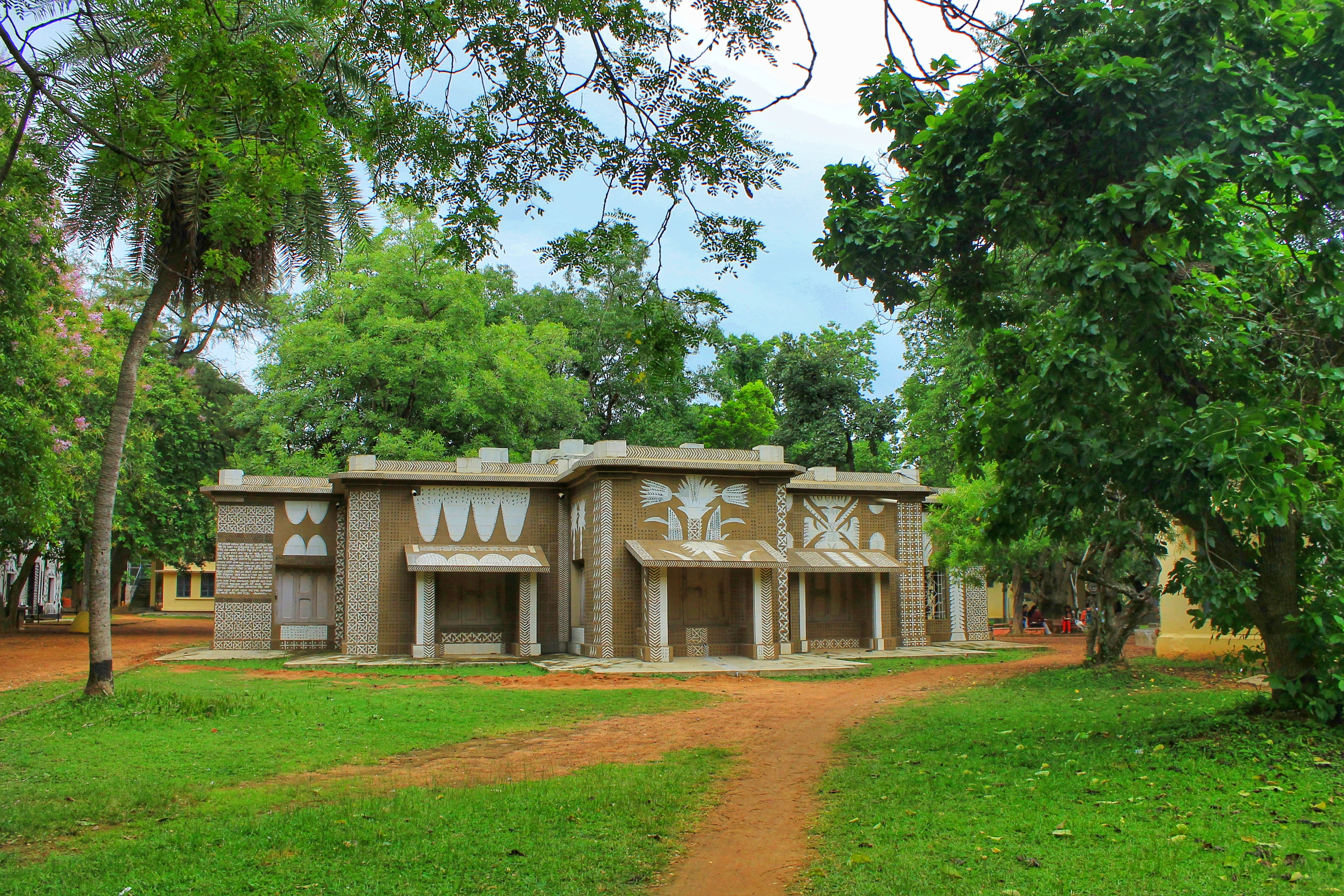
Mastermoshai Studio, Kala Bhavana, Shantiniketan

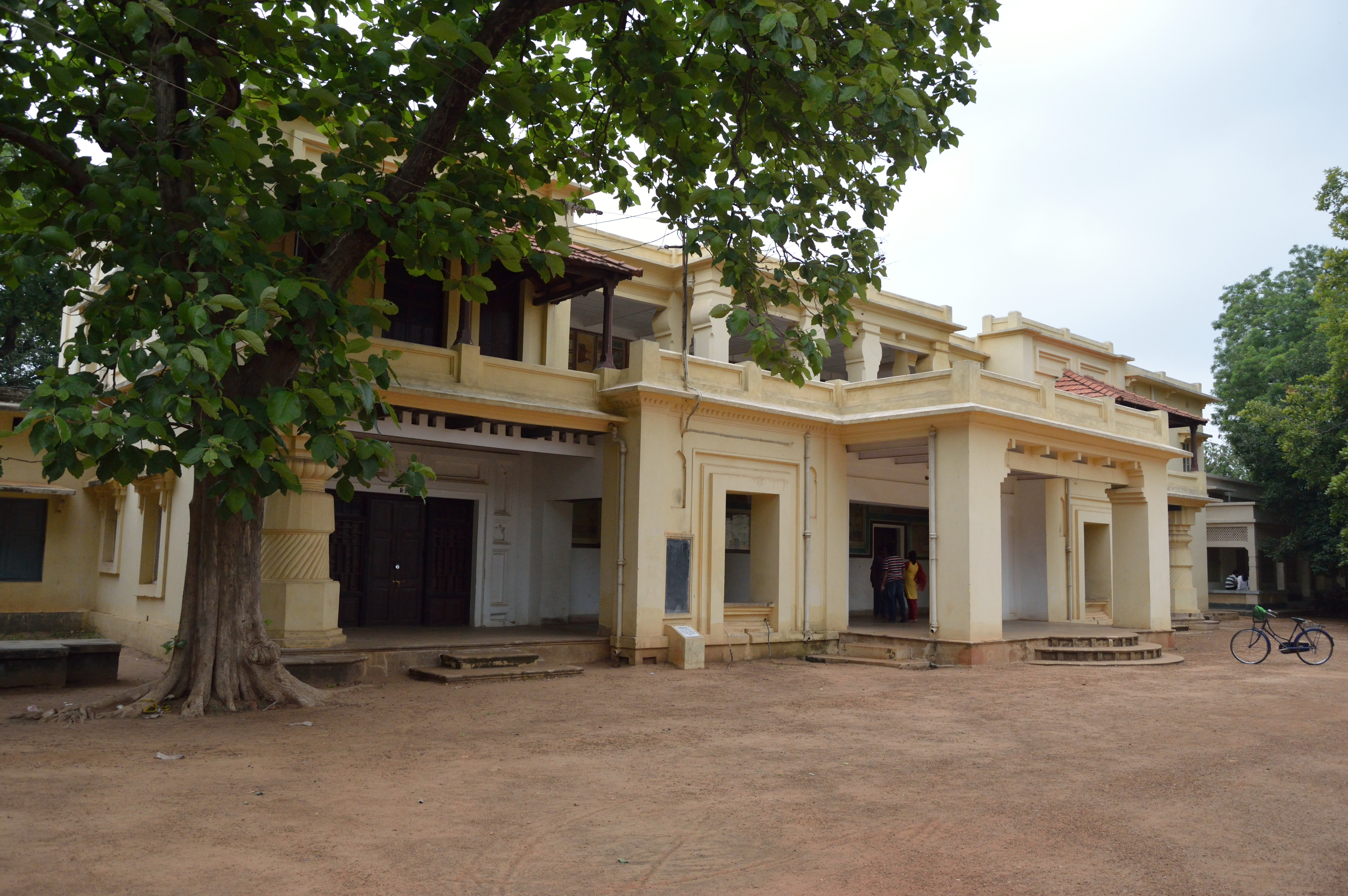
Vidyalaya Griha, Shantiniketan

== See also ==
- List of universities in India
- The Last Harvest: Paintings of Rabindranath Tagore
