= Ambhua =

- Census Town
- Location in West Bengal Ambhua (India)
- Coordinates: 24.5568°N 87.8651°E
- Country: India
- State: West Bengal
- District: Birbhum

Area
  - Total: 4.8803 km^{2} (1.8843 sq mi)

Population (2011)
  - Total: 10,477
  - Density: 2,146.8/km^{2} (5,560.2/sq mi)

Languages
  - Official: Bengali, English, Hindi
- Time zone: IST
- Telephone code: 03465
- Lok Sabha constituency: Birbhum
- Vidhan Sabha constituency: Murarai
- Website: birbhum.nic.in

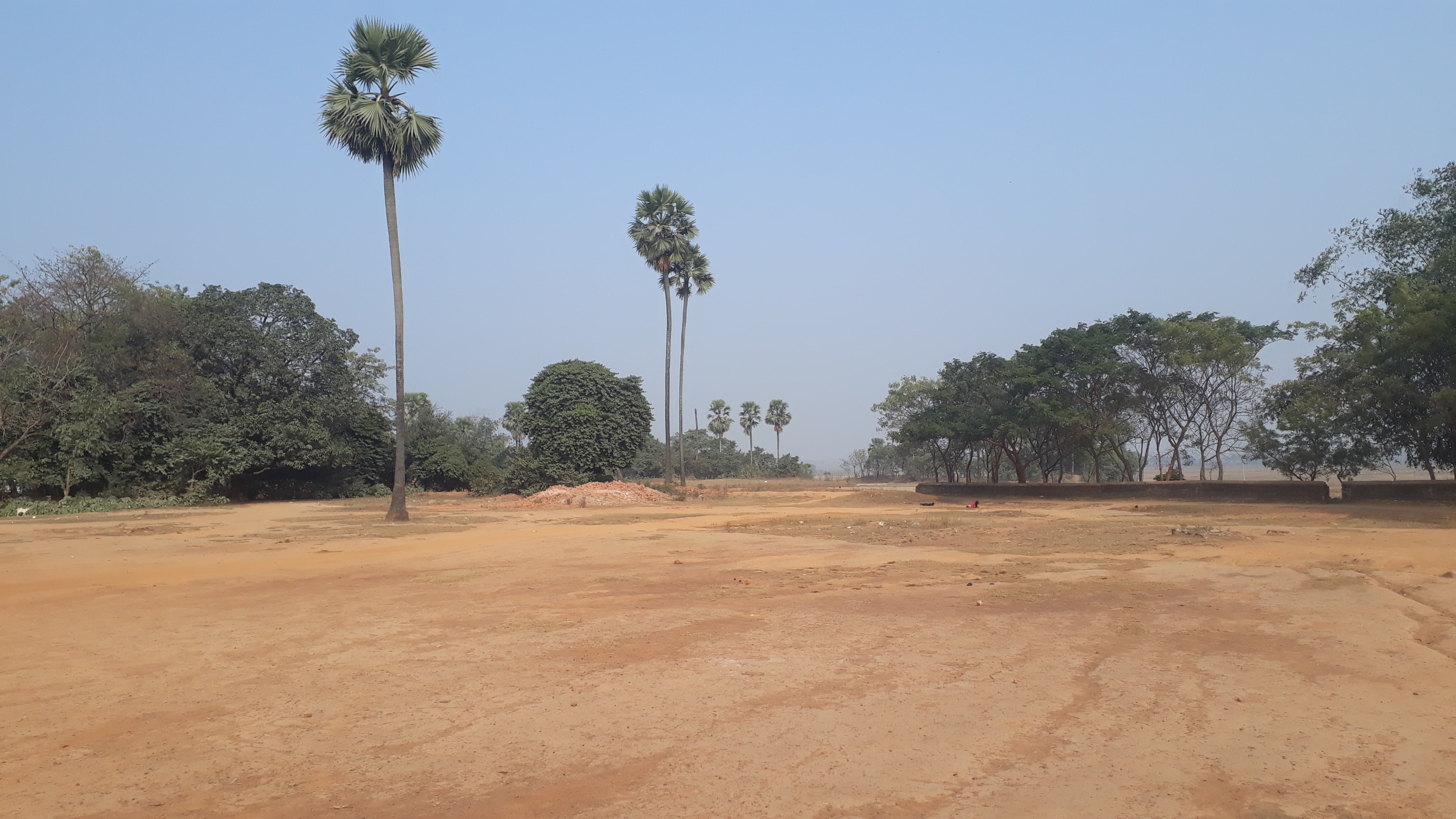
Ambhua Chakdanga Playground

Ambhua is a census town in Murarai I CD block in Rampurhat subdivision of Birbhum district.

== Geography ==
Cities and towns in Rampurhat subdivision of Birbhum district
M: municipal city/ town, CT: census town, R: rural/ urban centre.
Owing to space constraints in the small map, the actual locations in a larger map may vary slightly

=== Location ===
Ambhua is located at 24.5568°N 87.8651°E.

=== Overview ===
The northern portion of Rampurhat subdivision (shown in the map alongside) is part of the Nalhati Plains, a sub-micro physiographic region, and the southern portion is part of the Brahmani-Mayurakshi Basin, another sub-micro physiographic region occupying the area between the Brahmani in the north and the Mayurakshi in the south. There is an occasional intrusion of Rajmahal Hills, from adjoining Santhal Parganas, towards the north-western part of the subdivision. On the western side is Santhal Parganas and the border between West Bengal and Jharkhand can be seen in the map. Murshidabad district is on the eastern side. A small portion of the Padma River and the border with Bangladesh (thick line) can be seen in the north-eastern corner of the map. 96.62% of the population of Rampurhat subdivision live the rural areas and 3.38% of the population live in the urban areas.

Note: The map alongside presents some of the notable locations in the area. All places marked in the map are linked in the larger full screen map.

== Demographics ==
As per the 2011 Census of India, Ambhua had a total population of 10,477 of which 5,300 (51%) were males and 5,177 (49%) were females. Population below 6 years was 1,760. The total number of literates in Ambhua was 5,006 (57.43% of the population over 6 years).

== Infrastructure ==
As per the District Census Handbook 2011, Ambhua covered an area of 4.8803 km^{2}. There is a railway station at Rajgram 1 km away. Buses are available in the town. It has 11 km roads and both open and closed drains. The major source of protected water supply is from overhead tank. There are 1,420 domestic electric connections and 21 road light points. Amongst the medical facilities it has are 1 hospital with 50 beds, 1 family welfare centre and 2 medicine shops. Amongst the educational facilities it has are 3 primary schools, 1 secondary school and 1 senior secondary school. The nearest general degree college is 13 km away. Public library and reading room are available at Rajgram. It has branches of 1 nationalised and 1 cooperative bank.

== Transport ==
Ambhua is off State Highway 7, running from Rajgram to Midnapore.

== Education ==
Ambhua Junior High School, a Bengali-medium co-educational institution, was established in 2010. It has arrangements for teaching from class V to class VIII.

There is a Government Model School (Murarai-I) to the Western outskirts of the village, Ambhua.

Muktomon Gramin Samajik Patrika (Muktomon, a rural social magazine) was published on 2 June 2024 at Rajgaon Mahamaya High School. The purpose of the magazine is to drive away the addiction on social media of the students, especially the innocent kids. The editor of the magazine is Mr. Enayet Kabir Siddiqui.

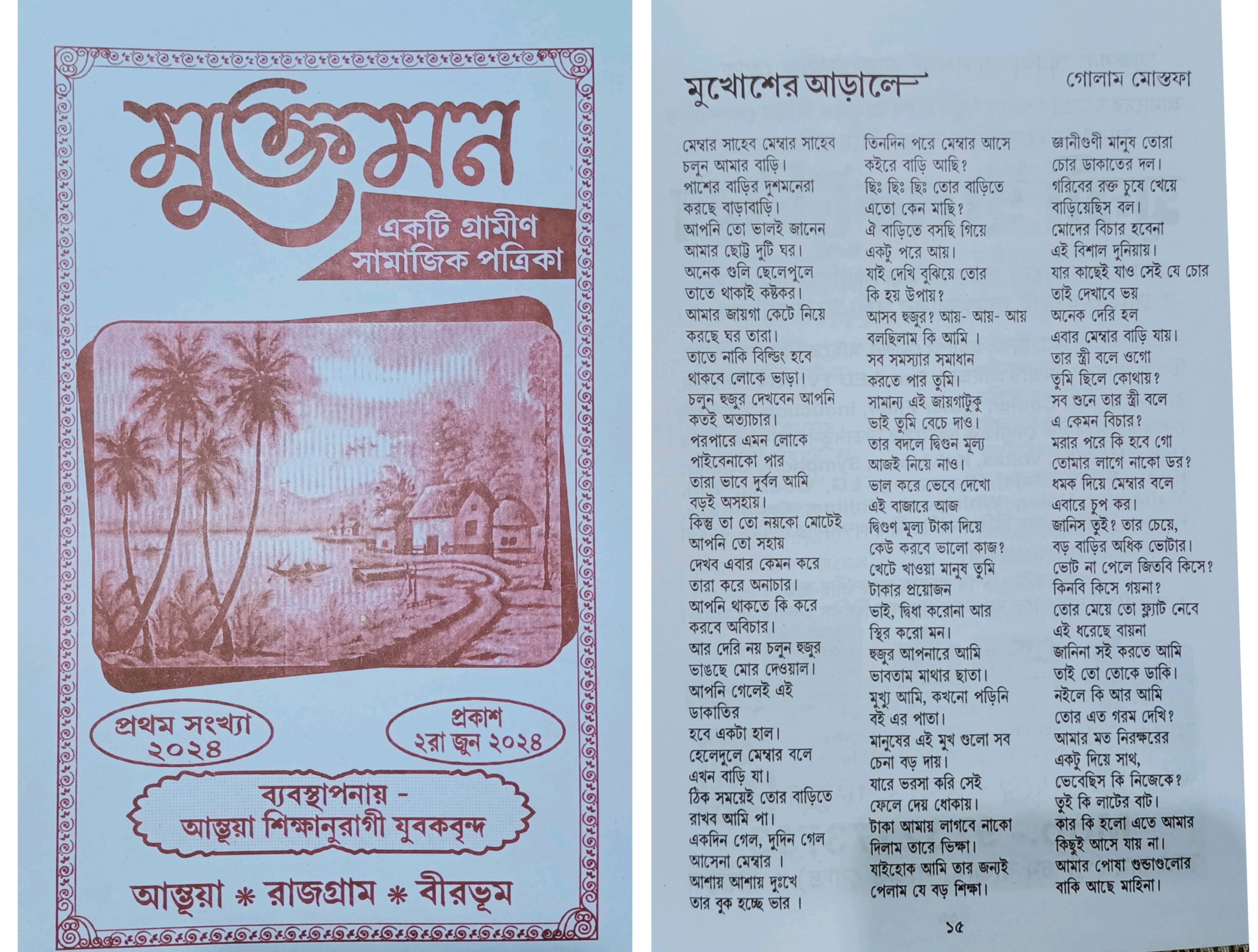
মুক্তমন, একটি গ্রামীণ সামাজিক পত্রিকা

There is an Islamic Institution naming Madrasa Islamia Ehiya Ul Uloom run by common people. It was established in 2011 by Maulana Nurul Huda with the donation of Quazi Jahirul Islam and the villagers.Later Quazi Habibul Islam took the responsibility of the madrasa (school).Specially the orphans and the poor children are taught here. Besides, there is a mosque next to the madrasa, Masjid E Habibia. It was established in 2021 by Quazi Habibul Islam.

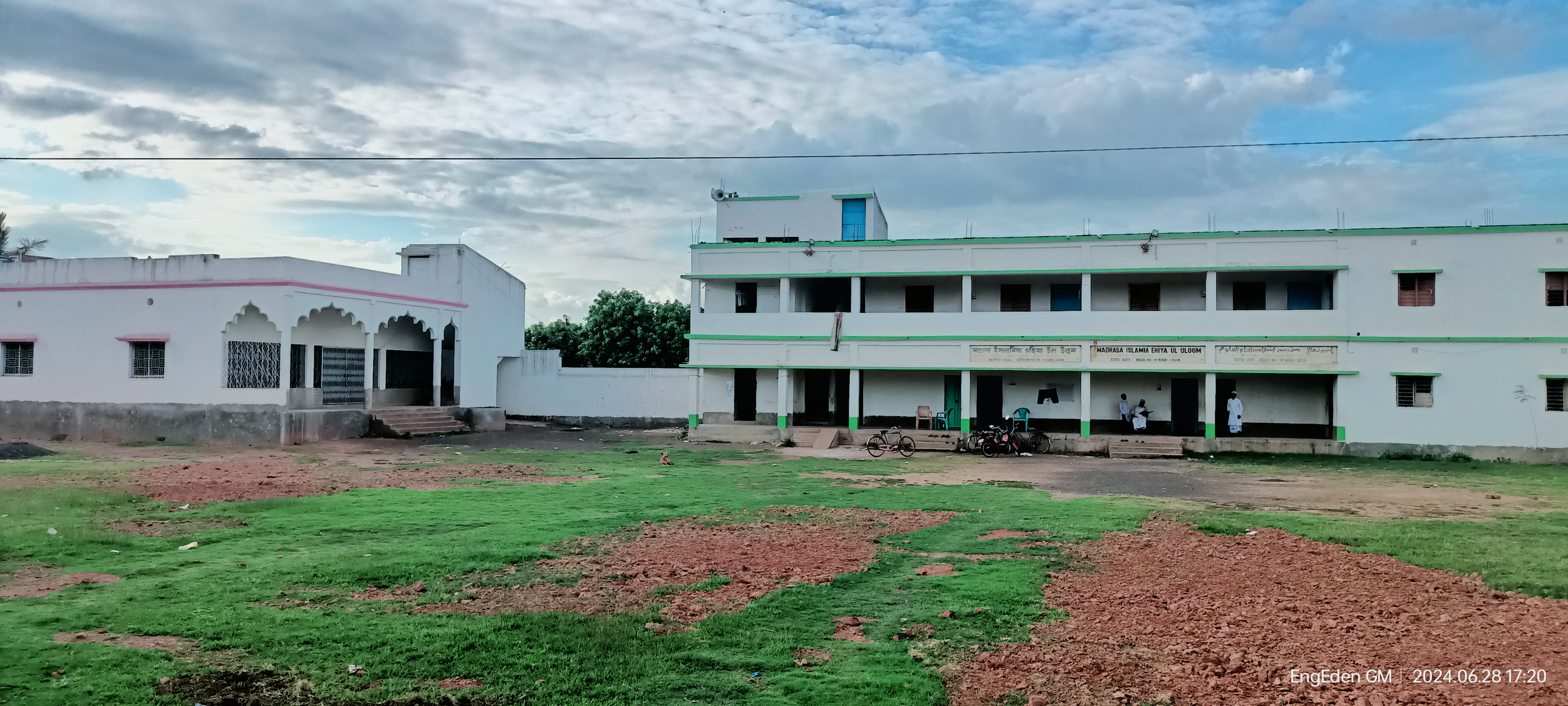
Madrasa Islamia Ehiya Ul Uloom with Masjid E Habibia

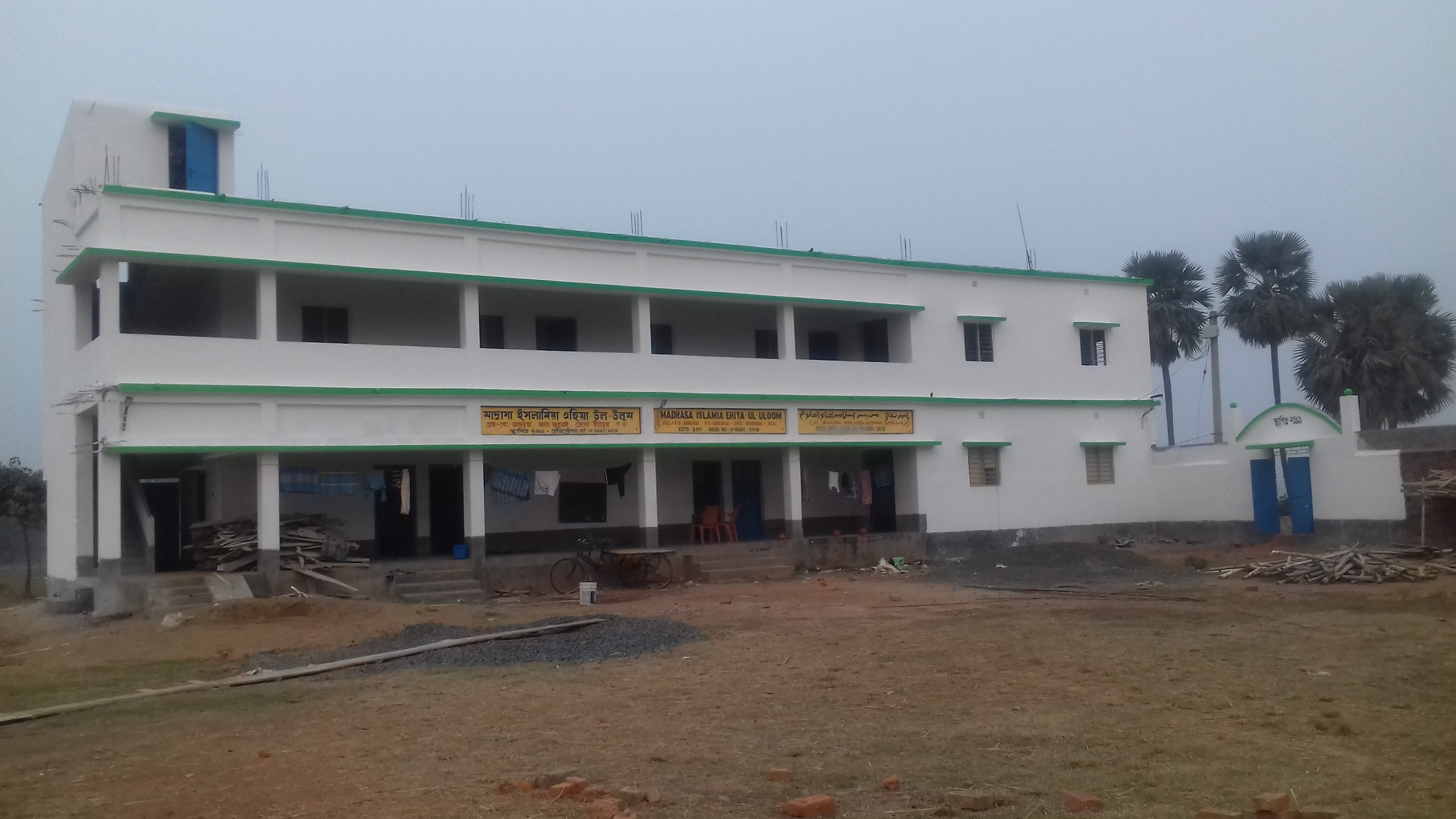
Madrasa Islamia Ehiya Ul Uloom
