= Rajgram =

Rajgram may refer to:

- Rajgram, West Bengal, is an Indian village Birbhum district
- Rajgram Vivekananda Hindu Vidyalaya, government school in Bankura district, West Bengal
- Rajgram railway station, is a railway station in Birbhum district
