= Mosarraf Hossain =

Indian politician

Dr. Mosarraf Hossain

Member of the West Bengal Legislative Assembly
- Incumbent
- Assumed office 2021
- Preceded by: Abdur Rahaman Liton
- Constituency: Murarai

Personal details
- Born: 1963 (age 62–63)
- Party: Democratic Trinamool Congress
- Parent: Dr. Motahar Hossain (father)
- Education: MBBS (University of Calcutta)

Mosarraf Hossain (born 1963) is an Indian politician from West Bengal. He is a member of the West Bengal Legislative Assembly from Murarai Assembly constituency in Birbhum district. He won the 2021 West Bengal Legislative Assembly election representing the All India Trinamool Congress.

== Early life and education ==
Hossain was born in 1963 to a Bengali family of Muslim physicians from Murarai in Birbhum district, West Bengal. He is the son of former MLA Dr. Motahar Hossain and a maternal grandson of Dr. Mohammad Hossain. He completed his MBBS in 1983 at NRS Medical College, which is affiliated with University of Calcutta, and later did the diploma in child health examination in 1998, at B.C Roy Children Hospital, also under University of Calcutta.

== Career ==
Hossain won from Murarai Assembly constituency representing All India Trinamool Congress in the 2021 West Bengal Legislative Assembly election. He polled 146,496 votes and defeated his nearest rival, Debasish Roy of the Bharatiya Janata Party, by a margin of 43,975 votes.
