= Chatra railway station =

Railway station in West Bengal, India

Chatra
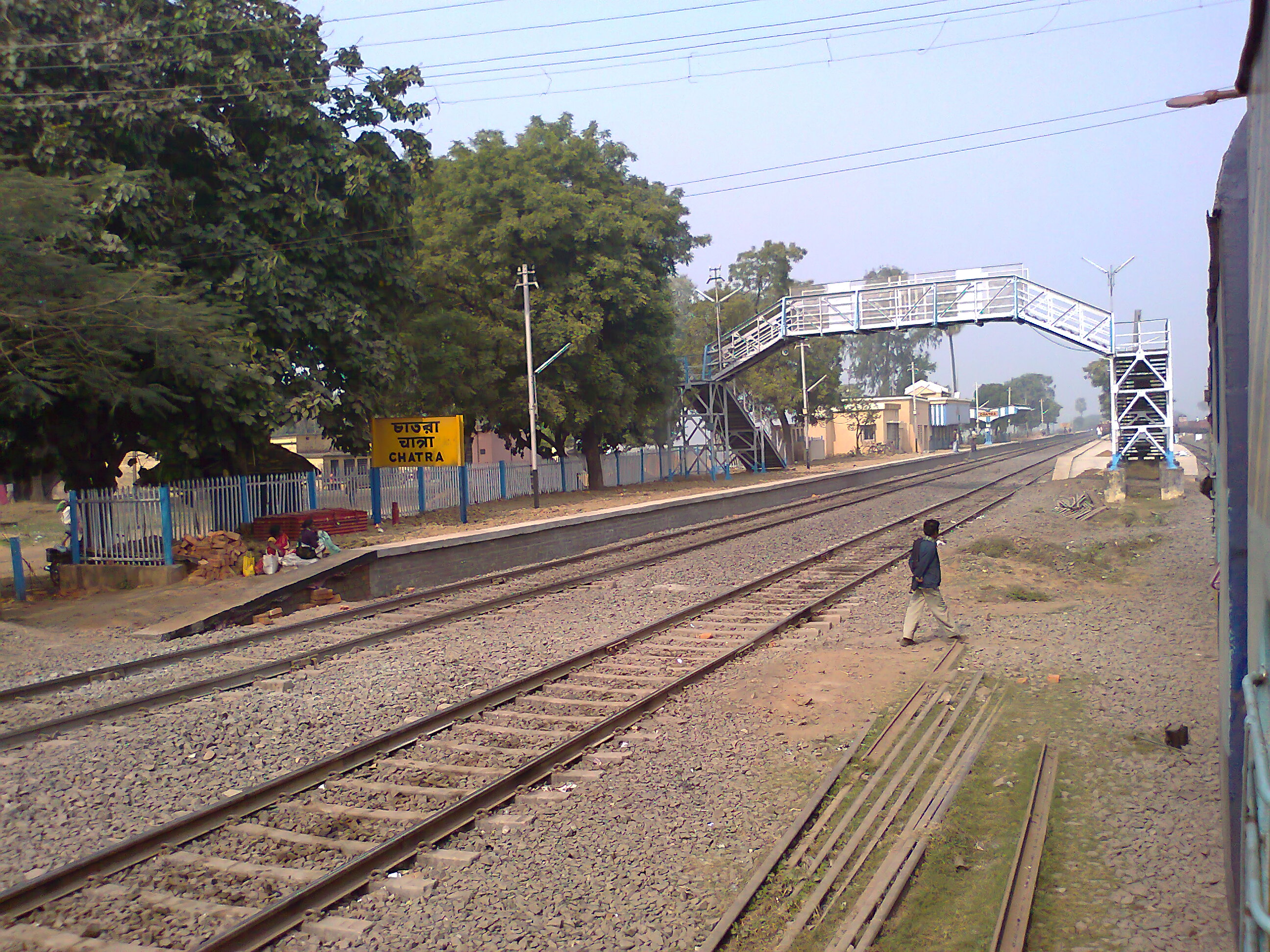

General information
- Location: Chatra, West Bengal; India
- Coordinates: 24°22′22″N 87°50′56″E
- Elevation: 33 m (108 ft)
- System: Indian Railways station
- Owner: Indian Railways
- Line: Rampurhat-Malda Town Section
- Platforms: 3
- Tracks: 3

Construction
- Structure type: Standard
- Parking: Available

Other information
- Station code: CTR
- Zone(s): Eastern Railways
- Division(s): Howrah

History
- Former names: East India Railway
Location
- Location within West Bengal Location within India

Chatra (code:CTR) is a small railway halt located on the Sahibganj loop. It is a small village, which comes under Murarai I (community development block).

Chatra
Next station west: Murarai	Indian Railways : Sahibganj loop			Next station east: Nalhati
Next station west: Murarai	Stop no. 51	km from start 0	Platforms 3	Next station east: Nalhati
