= NGF =

NGF may refer to:

== Military ==
- National Guard Forces Command, Russian gendarmerie
- Naval gunfire; see Naval gunfire support
- Northern Group of Forces, the Soviet army in Poland
- North German Federation, 1866 military alliance, part of German unification
- New Generation Fighter, a proposed European fighter aircraft programme; see Future Combat Air System

== Other ==
- Nagarnabi railway station, Jharkhand, India
- National Gay Federation, Ireland, now the National LGBT Federation
- Nerve growth factor
- National Golf Foundation, a trade association in the United States
- Norwegian Golf Federation
- Non-growing follicles, in the ovaries; see Folliculogenesis
- Nivellement général de la France, a network of surveying benchmarks; see General levelling of France
- Norwegian Graphical Union, a former printing industry trade union
- Trans–New Guinea languages
