= CMJ (disambiguation) =

CMJ was a music events/online media company which hosted an annual festival in New York City

CMJ may also refer to:

- Central Motorway Junction, motorway interchange in Auckland, New Zealand
- Christopher Martin-Jenkins (1945–2013), English cricket journalist and broadcaster
- Church's Ministry Among Jewish People, an Anglican church organisation
- CMJ University, Chandra Mohan Jha University, India
- College Mathematics Journal, a journal of the Mathematical Association of America
- Computer Music Journal, quarterly academic journal covering digital audio signal processing and electroacoustic music
- The Cormac McCarthy Journal, an academic journal dedicated to the works of American author Cormac McCarthy
- Qimei Airport (IATA airport code), Cimei, Penghu, Taiwan
- CMJ ammo, full metal jacket ammunition with cupronickel jacket
