= Rajgram railway station =

Railway station in West Bengal

Rajgram

General information
- Location: Rajgram, West Bengal; India
- Coordinates: 24°32′42″N 87°52′4″E
- Elevation: 33 metres (108 ft)
- System: Indian Railways station
- Owner: Indian Railways
- Line: Rampurhat-Malda Town Section
- Platforms: 3
- Tracks: 4

Construction
- Structure type: At grade

Other information
- Station code: RJG
- Zone(s): Eastern Railway
- Division(s): Howrah
- Classification: NSG-5

History
- Former names: East India Railway
Location
- Location within West Bengal Location within India

Rajgram is a small station located in the Rajgram panchayat of Birbhum district of West Bengal. It is the first station of West Bengal, on the Rampurhat-Malda Town section, located on the West Bengal–Jharkhand border. It is a small village that comes under Murarai I community development block. This station is categorized as NSG-5 and operates within the Howrah Division in Eastern Railway. The station code is RJG.

== Platforms ==
The station has a total of 3 platforms and is served by 15 halting trains.

== Important Trains ==
- Howrah–Malda Town Intercity Express via Rampurhat
- Gour Express
- Rampurhat - Gaya Passenger

== Railway Goods Sheds ==
The Rajgram Public Siding (RJPS) is a facility dedicated to handling stone transportation and operates daily from 6:00 AM to 10:00 PM. Similarly, the Rajgaon Stone Company Siding (RSCS) is a private facility specializing in stone transportation, with the same operating hours of 6:00 AM to 10:00 PM.

== See also ==
- Murarai railway station
- Nalhati Junction railway station
- Rampurhat Junction railway station
- Malda Town Station
- List of railway stations in India

Rajgram
Next station west: Nagarnabi	Indian Railways : Sahibganj loop			Next station east: Banshlai Bridge
Next station west: Nagarnabi	Stop no. 50	km from start 0	Platforms 3	Next station east: Banshlai Bridge
