= Abdur Rahaman Liton =

West Bengal politician

Member of West Bengal Legislative Assembly
- In office 2016–2021
- Preceded by: Noor Alam Chowdhury
- Succeeded by: Dr. Mosarraf Hossain
- Constituency: Murarai

Personal details
- Born: January 21, 1961 Duria, Birbhum district, West Bengal
- Died: 17 April 2021 (age 60) Kolkata, West Bengal, India
- Party: Trinamool Congress
- Education: CMJ University

Abdur Rahaman Liton (1958 – 2021) was an Indian social worker and politician belonging to the Trinamool Congress. He served as a member of the West Bengal Legislative Assembly.

== Early life and family ==
Abdur Rahaman Liton was born in 1958 to a Bengali Muslim family in the village of Duria in Birbhum district, West Bengal. He was the son of Abdur Rahim and obtained his Bachelor of Arts in political science from the CMJ University, Meghalaya in 2012.

== Career ==
Liton contested in the 2016 West Bengal Legislative Assembly election where he ran as a Trinamool Congress candidate for Murarai Assembly constituency, winning against Congress politician Ali Mortuza Khan.
