= Shamsuddin Ahmed =

Shamsuddin Ahmad is a Bengali name of Arabic origin. Notable bearers of the name include:

- Shamsuddin Ahmad Shah (1419–1436), Sultan of Bengal
- Shamsuddin Ahmed (surgeon) (1920–1971), East Pakistan medical doctor killed in the Bangladesh Liberation war
- Shamsuddin Ahmed (Pakistani politician) (1889–1969), East Pakistani lawyer and politician
- Shamsuddin Ahmed Ishaq (1941–2005), Bangladeshi poet and politician
- Samsuddin Ahmed (1945–2020), Bangladeshi former MP
- Shamsuddin Ahmed (Naogaon-5 MP), Bangladeshi politician
- Shamsuddin Ahmed (Mymensingh-6 MP) (died 2020), Bangladeshi engineer and politician
- Shamsuddin Ahmed (Comilla-12 MP), Bangladeshi former MP
- Shamsuddin Ahmad Chowdhury, Bangladeshi physician and politician
- Shamsuddin Ahammad, West Bengali politician

== See also ==
- Shamsuddin
- Ahmed
