= Barua Gopalpur =

- Census Town
- Location in West Bengal Barua Gopalpur (India)
- Coordinates: 24.5618°N 87.8121°E
- Country: India
- State: West Bengal
- District: Birbhum

Area
  - Total: 11.7582 km^{2} (4.5399 sq mi)

Population (2011)
  - Total: 6,614
  - Density: 562.5/km^{2} (1,457/sq mi)

Languages
  - Official: Bengali, English
- Time zone: IST
- PIN: 731222 (Barua Gopalpur)
- Telephone code: 03465
- Lok Sabha constituency: Birbhum
- Vidhan Sabha constituency: Murarai
- Website: birbhum.nic.in

Barua Gopalpur is a census town in Murarai I CD block in Rampurhat subdivision of Birbhum district.

== Geography ==
Cities and towns in Rampurhat subdivision of Birbhum district
M: municipal city/ town, CT: census town, R: rural/ urban centre.
Owing to space constraints in the small map, the actual locations in a larger map may vary slightly

=== Location ===
Barua Gopalpur is located at 24.5618°N 87.8121°E.

=== Overview ===
The northern portion of Rampurhat subdivision (shown in the map alongside) is part of the Nalhati Plains, a sub-micro physiographic region, and the southern portion is part of the Brahmani-Mayurakshi Basin, another sub-micro physiographic region occupying the area between the Brahmani in the north and the Mayurakshi in the south. There is an occasional intrusion of Rajmahal Hills, from adjoining Santhal Parganas, towards the north-western part of the subdivision. On the western side is Santhal Parganas and the border between West Bengal and Jharkhand can be seen in the map. Murshidabad district is on the eastern side. A small portion of the Padma River and the border with Bangladesh (thick line) can be seen in the north-eastern corner of the map. 96.62% of the population of Rampurhat subdivision live the rural areas and 3.38% of the population live in the urban areas.

Note: The map alongside presents some of the notable locations in the area. All places marked in the map are linked in the larger full screen map.

== Demographics ==
As per the 2011 Census of India, Barua Gopalpur had a total population of 6,614 of which 3,393 (51%) were males and 3,221 (49%) were females. Population below 6 years was 1,137. The total number of literates in Barua Gopalpur was 2,597 (47.42% of the population over 6 years).

== Infrastructure ==
As per the District Census Handbook 2011, Barua Gopalpur covered an area of 11.7582 km^{2}. There is a railway station at Rajgram nearby. Buses are available in the town. It has 8 km roads and both open and closed drains. The major source of protected water supply is from overhead tank. There are 750 domestic electric connections and 5 road light points. Amongst the medical facilities it has are 6 medicine shops. Amongst the educational facilities it has are 5 primary schools, 1 middle school and 1 secondary school. The nearest senior secondary school is available 6 km away and the nearest general degree college is 20 km away. Amongst the commodities produced are stone chips.

== Transport ==
A short stretch of local roads connect Barua Gopalpur to State Highway 7, running from Rajgram to Midnapore.

== Education ==
Gopalpur Sohagia High School, a Bengali-medium co-educational institution, was established in 1933. It has arrangements for teaching from class V to class X. Gopalpur sisu sikha kendro, a Bengal-medium co-educational institution
