= Nagarnabi railway station =

Railway station in Jharkhand

Nagarnabi
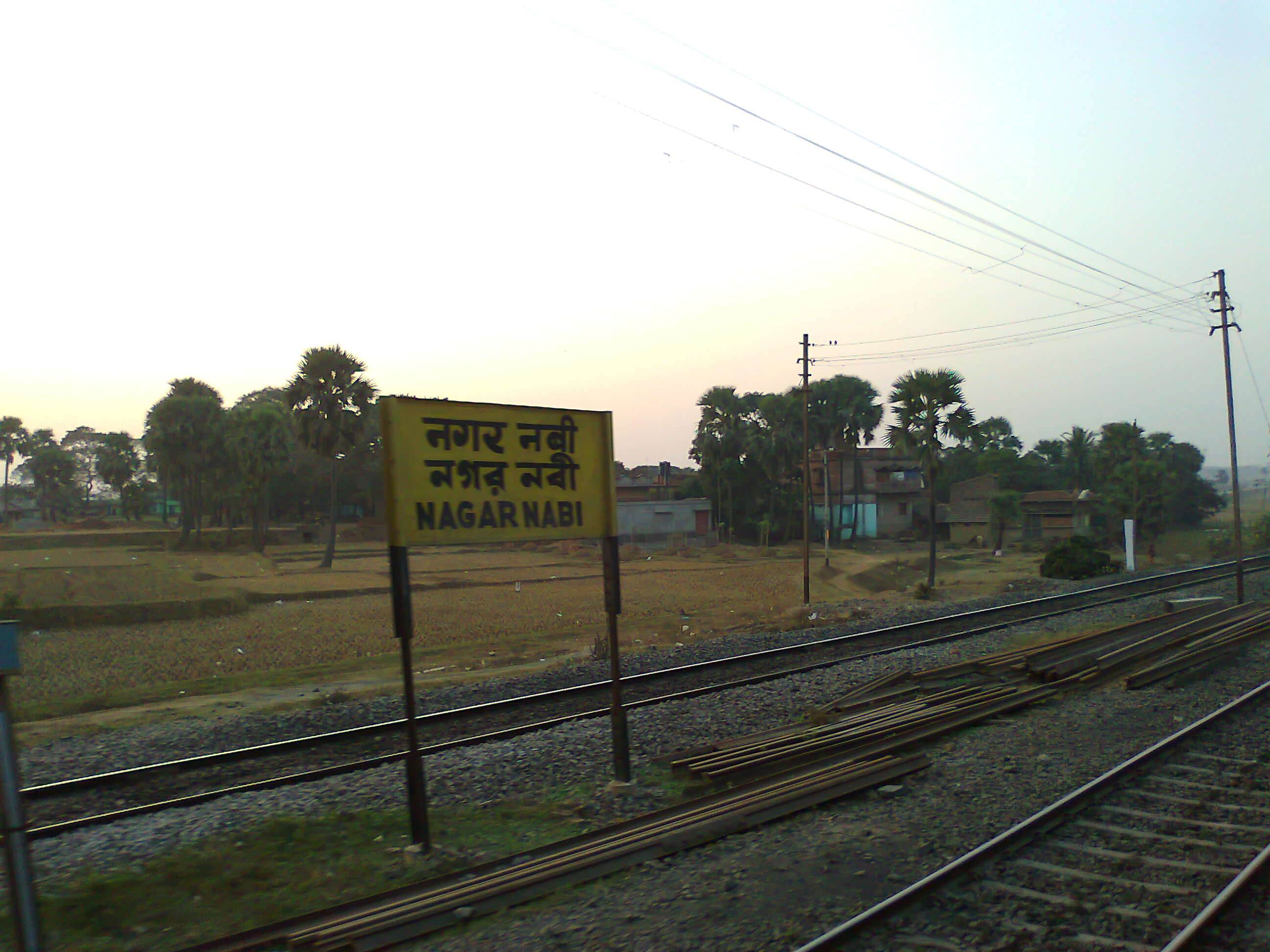
- West side of station

General information
- Location: Nagarnabi, Jharkhand; India
- Coordinates: 24°35′26″N 87°52′5″E
- Elevation: 30 m (98 ft)
- System: Indian Railways station
- Owner: Indian Railways
- Line: Rampurhat-Malda Town Section
- Platforms: 2
- Tracks: 2

Construction
- Structure type: Standard

Other information
- Station code: NGF
- Zone(s): Eastern Railways
- Division(s): Howrah

History
- Former names: East India Railway
Location

Nagarnabi railway station (code:NGF) is a small station located on the Jharkhand–West Bengal border. It is the last railway station of Jharkhand falling on the Rampurhat-Malda Town section under Eastern Railway zone.

Nagarnabi
Next station west: Pakur	Indian Railways : Sahibganj loop			Next station east: Rajgram
Next station west: Pakur	Stop no. 49	km from start 0	Platforms 2	Next station east: Rajgram
