= Noor Alam Chowdhury =

Indian politician

Nure Alam Chowdhury নূর আলম চৌধুরী

Minister for Animal Resources Development
- In office May 20, 2011 – 2016
- Governor: M. K. Narayanan

MLA
- In office May 13, 2011 – May 19, 2016
- Governor: M. K. Narayanan
- Preceded by: Mohammed Qamre Elahi
- Succeeded by: Abdur Rahaman Liton
- Constituency: Murarai

Personal details
- Born: Margram, Birbhum district, Bengal Presidency 11 August 1943
- Died: 31 January 2021 (aged 77) Kolkata
- Party: All India Trinamool Congress
- Spouse: Mamtaz Sanghamita
- Relatives: Syed Abul Mansur Habibullah (father-in-law)

Justice Nure Alam Chowdhury (11 August 1943 31 January 2021) was an acting Chief Justice in Calcutta High Court and former Minister of Animal Resources Development in the Government of West Bengal.

== Early life and family ==
Chowdhury was born on 11 August 1943 to a Bengali family of Muslim Chowdhuries in the village of Margram in Birbhum district, Bengal Presidency. He was the son of Madrassa Headmaster Fazlul Ali Chowdhury.

== Career ==
Chowdhury joined his uncle's practice in Suri District Court in 1966 and acted mainly in property and criminal matters wherein he also appeared before the courts in Asansol, Durgapur, Burdwan and Maldah. He joined the Appellate Side Bar of the Calcutta High Court in 1972 in the chambers of Advocate Dipankar Gupta and until 1977 he mainly appeared as an Assistant Government Pleader. He was elevated as an Additional Judge of the Calcutta High Court in 1992 and retired as the Acting Chief Justice in 2005. Chowdhury contested in the 2009 Indian general election as a Trinamool Congress candidate for Ghatal Lok Sabha constituency but was unsuccessful. He was elected to the West Bengal Legislative Assembly from the Murarai Assembly constituency in the 2011 West Bengal Legislative Assembly election.
