= Murarai =

- Census Town
- Location in West Bengal, India Murarai (India)
- Coordinates: 24.442789°N 87.857471°E
- Country: India
- State: West Bengal
- District: Birbhum

Government
  - Type: Panchyat
  - Body: Murarai gram panchyat

Area
  - Total: 1.047 km^{2} (0.404 sq mi)

Population (2011)
  - Total: 5,770
  - Density: 5,510/km^{2} (14,300/sq mi)

Languages
  - Official: Bengali, English
- Time zone: UTC+5:30 (IST)
- PIN: 731219
- Telephone code: 03465
- Vehicle registration: WB
- Lok Sabha constituency: Birbhum
- Vidhan Sabha constituency: Murarai
- Website: birbhum.nic.in

Murarai is a census town in Murarai I CD block in Rampurhat subdivision of Birbhum district in the Indian state of West Bengal.

== Culture ==
Murarai Amader Asha, gramin pathagar, a government-sponsored library, was established in 1981. Bhadiswar Anjuman Club, a society which was established in 1977 located in Bhadiswar.

== Demographics ==
As per the 2011 Census of India, Murarai had a total population of 5,770 of which 2,976 (52%) were males and 2,794 (48%) were females. Population below 6 years was 747. The total number of literates in Murarai was 3,446 (68.60% of the population over 6 years).

== Geography ==
Cities and towns in Rampurhat subdivision of Birbhum district
M: municipal city/ town, CT: census town, R: rural/ urban centre.
Owing to space constraints in the small map, the actual locations in a larger map may vary slightly

=== Police station ===
Murarai police station has jurisdiction over Murarai I and Murarai II CD blocks.

=== CD block HQ ===
The headquarters of Murarai I CD block are located at Murarai.

=== Overview ===
The northern portion of Rampurhat subdivision (shown in the map alongside) is part of the Nalhati Plains, a sub-micro physiographic region, and the southern portion is part of the Brahmani-Mayurakshi Basin, another sub-micro physiographic region occupying the area between the Brahmani in the north and the Mayurakshi in the south. There is an occasional intrusion of Rajmahal Hills, from adjoining Santhal Parganas, towards the north-western part of the subdivision. On the western side is Santhal Parganas and the border between West Bengal and Jharkhand can be seen in the map. Murshidabad district is on the eastern side. A small portion of the Padma River and the border with Bangladesh (thick line) can be seen in the north-eastern corner of the map. 96.62% of the population of Rampurhat subdivision live the rural areas and 3.38% of the population live in the urban areas.

Note: The map alongside presents some of the notable locations in the area. All places marked in the map are linked in the larger full screen map.

== Healthcare ==
Murarai Rural Hospital at Murarai has 50 beds.

== Infrastructure ==
As per the District Census Handbook 2011, Murarai covered an area of 1.047 km^{2} (0.404 sq mi). It has a railway station. Buses are available in the town. It has 5 km (3.1 mi) roads and both open and closed drains. The major source of protected water supply is from overhead tank. There are 463 domestic electric connections. Amongst the medical facilities it has 1 hospital with 50 beds. Amongst the educational facilities it has are 3 primary schools, 1 secondary school, 1 senior secondary school and 1 general degree college. Amongst the recreational and cultural facilities it has 1 cinema theatre, 1 auditorium/ community hall, 1 public library and 1 reading room, either in the town or nearby. It has branches of 1 nationalised bank and 1 agricultural credit society. Amongst the commodities it produces are cloth, mustard oil and flour.

== Post Office ==
Murarai has a delivery sub post office, with PIN 731219, under Rampurhat head office. Branch office with the same PIN are situated at Amdole, Bahadurpur, Beliapalsa, Bhimpur, Bipranandigram, Dhananjoypur, Dumurgram, Edrakpur, Kahinagar, Kalahapur, Kanakpur, Kathia, Malaypur, Nayagram, Ramchandrapur and Ruprampur.

== Transport ==
Murarai railway station is on the Sahibganj loop.

State Highway 7, running from Rajgram to Midnapore, connecting to National Highway 14, passes through Murarai. Bhadiswar Road links Murarai to National Highway 114A at Umarpur.

== Education ==
Kabi Nazrul College was established at Murarai in 1985. Located in a remote area of the district, it caters to many first generation learners.

Murarai Government Polytechnic was established at Murarai in 2015.

Murarai AK Institution, higher secondary government aided school which was established in 1940, simultaneously a girls higher secondary Murarai Gourangini Balika Vidyalaya is running since 1962. In 2002 another higher secondary school was established by the name of Bhadiswar SP Roy Vidyabhavan.
