= Bara 1 =

Parliamentary constituency in the Bara District of Nepal

- Parliamentary constituency
- Bara 1 in Province No. 2
- Province: Province No. 2
- District: Bara District

Current constituency
- Created: 1991
- Seats: 3
- Member of Parliament: Ganesh Dhimal (RSP)
- Madhesh Province MP 1ख: Saroj Yadav
- Madhesh Province MP 1क: Triloki Prasad

Bara 1 is one of four parliamentary constituencies of Bara District in Nepal. This constituency came into existence on the Constituency Delimitation Commission (CDC) report submitted on 31 August 2017.

== Incorporated areas ==
Bara 1 incorporates Simraungadh Municipality, Adarshkotwal Rural Municipality, Baragadhi Rural Municipality, Nijgadh Municipality and wards 1–7 and 9–11 of Kolhabi Municipality.

== Assembly segments ==
It encompasses the following Province No. 2 Provincial Assembly segment

- Bara 1(A)
- Bara 1(B)

== Members of Parliament ==
=== Parliament/Constituent Assembly ===
Election	Member	Party
1991	Mukunda Neupane	CPN (Unified Marxist–Leninist)
1999	Umakant Chaudhary	Nepali Congress
2008	Saroj Kumar Yadav	Sadhbhavana Party
2011	Saroj Kumar Yadav	Sanghiya Sadbhavana Party
2013	Ram Ayodhya Prasad Yadav	Nepali Congress
2017	Umakant Chaudhary	Nepali Congress
2022	Achyut Prasad Mainali	CPN (Unified Marxist–Leninist)
2026	Ganesh Dhimal	Rastriya Swatantra Party

=== Provincial Assembly ===
==== 1(A) ====
Election	Member	Party
2017	Triloki Prasad	CPN (Unified Marxist-Leninist)
May 2018	Triloki Prasad	Nepal Communist Party

==== 1(B) ====
Election	Member	Party
2017	Saroj Kumar Yadav	Rastriya Janata Party Nepal
April 2020	Saroj Kumar Yadav	People's Socialist Party, Nepal

== Election results ==
=== Election in the 2020s ===
==== 2022 general election ====
Candidate	Party	Votes	%
Ganesh Dhimal	Rastriya Swatantra Party	39,998	53.13
Shambhu Bahadur Budathoki	Nepali Congress	14,223	18.89
Achyut Prasad Mainali	CPN (UML)	11,645	15.47
Santosh Dangal	Nepal Communist Party	2,878	3.82
Rambabu Prasad Yadav	People's Socialist Party (Nepal, 2024)	2,530	3.36
Jaya Kishor Pandey	Independent	941	1.25
Others		3,070	4.08
Total		75,285	100.00
Majority		25,775	
Rastriya Swatantra Party gain			

==== 2022 general election ====
Candidate	Party	Votes	%
Achyut Prasad Mainali	CPN (UML)	39,195	50.23
Umakant Chaudhary	Nepali Congress	30,056	38.52
Ganesh Dhimal	Rastriya Swatantra Party	3,319	4.25
Bhakta Bahadur Darlami	Rastriya Prajatantra Party	1,792	2.30
Anil Kumar Gupta	Independent	1,133	1.45
Manoj Kumar Yadav	Janamat Party	1,063	1.36
Others		1,471	1.89
Total		78,029	100.00
Majority		9,139	
CPN (UML) gain			

=== Election in the 2010s ===
==== 2017 legislative elections ====
Party	Candidate	Votes
Nepali Congress	Umakant Chaudhary	24,450
CPN (Unified Marxist–Leninist)	Achyut Prasad Mainali	22,030
Rastriya Janata Party Nepal	Ram Kishore Prasad Yadav	20,144
Others		598
Invalid votes		3,004
Result	Congress hold	
Source: Election Commission

==== 2017 Nepalese provincial elections ====
===== 1(A) =====
Party	Candidate	Votes
CPN (Unified Marxist–Leninist)	Triloki Prasad	18,445
Nepali Congress	Pema Siddhi Lama	16,484
Federal Socialist Forum, Nepal	Suresh Baitha	2,478
Others		675
Invalid votes		1,188
Result	CPN (UML) gain	
Source: Election Commission

===== 1(B) =====
Party	Candidate	Votes
Rastriya Janata Party Nepal	Saroj Kumar Yadav	14,269
Nepali Congress	Bhagwat Prasad Sah	8,126
Communist Party of Nepal (Maoist Centre)	Mohammad Islam Ansari	5,435
Others		1,507
Invalid votes		1,559
Result	RJPN gain	
Source: Election Commission

==== 2013 Constituent Assembly election ====
Party	Candidate	Votes
Nepali Congress	Ram Ayodhya Prasad Yadav	8,337
Madhesi Jana Adhikar Forum (Republican)	Ram Kishore Prasad Yadav	6,978
Terai Madhes Loktantrik Party	Jitendra Singh	4,763
Sadhbhavana Party	Saroj Kumar Yadav	3,777
Madhesi Jana Adhikar Forum, Nepal	Ram Babu Prasad Yadav	3,336
CPN (Unified Marxist–Leninist)	Batahu Raya Yadav	3,252
UCPN (Maoist)	Jwala Kumari Sah	3,002
Federal Socialist Party, Nepal	Manjarul Hal Ansari	1,818
Others		3,698
Result	Congress gain	
Source: NepalNews

=== Election in the 2000s ===
==== 2008 Constituent Assembly election ====
Party	Candidate	Votes
Sadhbhavana Party	Saroj Kumar Yadav	8,182
Madhesi Jana Adhikar Forum, Nepal	Ram Babu Prasad Yadav	7,878
CPN (Maoist)	Shambhu Mahato Dhanuk	7,513
Nepali Congress	Ram Ayodhya Prasad Yadav	6,651
CPN (Unified Marxist–Leninist)	Chhadhu Prasad Yadav	5,682
Terai Madhes Loktantrik Party	Jitendra Singh	2,410
CPN (Marxist–Leninist)	Makbul Maya Ansari	1,209
Nepal Sadhbhavana Party (Anandidevi)	Lalan Prasad	1,131
Rastriya Prajatantra Party	Raj Narayan Prasad Sah	1,026
Others		2,754
Invalid votes		2,815
Result	Sadhbhavana gain	
Source: Election Commission

=== Election in the 1990s ===
==== 1999 legislative elections ====
Party	Candidate	Votes
Nepali Congress	Umakant Chaudhary	23,601
CPN (Unified Marxist–Leninist)	Mukunda Neupane	20,646
Nepal Sadbhawana Party	Parmananda Prasad Yadav	4,890
CPN (Marxist–Leninist)	Chabi Lal Uprety	2,363
Rastriya Prajatantra Party	Raj Narayan Sah Teli	2,136
Others		553
Invalid Votes		1,340
Result	Congress gain	
Source: Election Commission

==== 1994 legislative elections ====
Party	Candidate	Votes
CPN (Unified Marxist–Leninist)	Mukunda Neupane	17,953
Nepali Congress	Shobhakar Parajuli	15,552
Nepal Sadbhawana Party	Parmanand Prasad Yadav	5,546
Rastriya Prajatantra Party	Nurual Hoda Ansari	4,954
Others		2,394
Result	CPN (UML) hold	
Source: Election Commission

==== 1991 legislative elections ====
Party	Candidate	Votes
CPN (Unified Marxist–Leninist)	Mukunda Neupane	16,990
Nepali Congress	Janardan Phujadar	14,747
Result	CPN (UML) gain	

== See also ==
- List of parliamentary constituencies of Nepal
