= S. S. Ahluwalia =

Indian politician (born 1951)

Surendrajeet Singh Ahluwalia
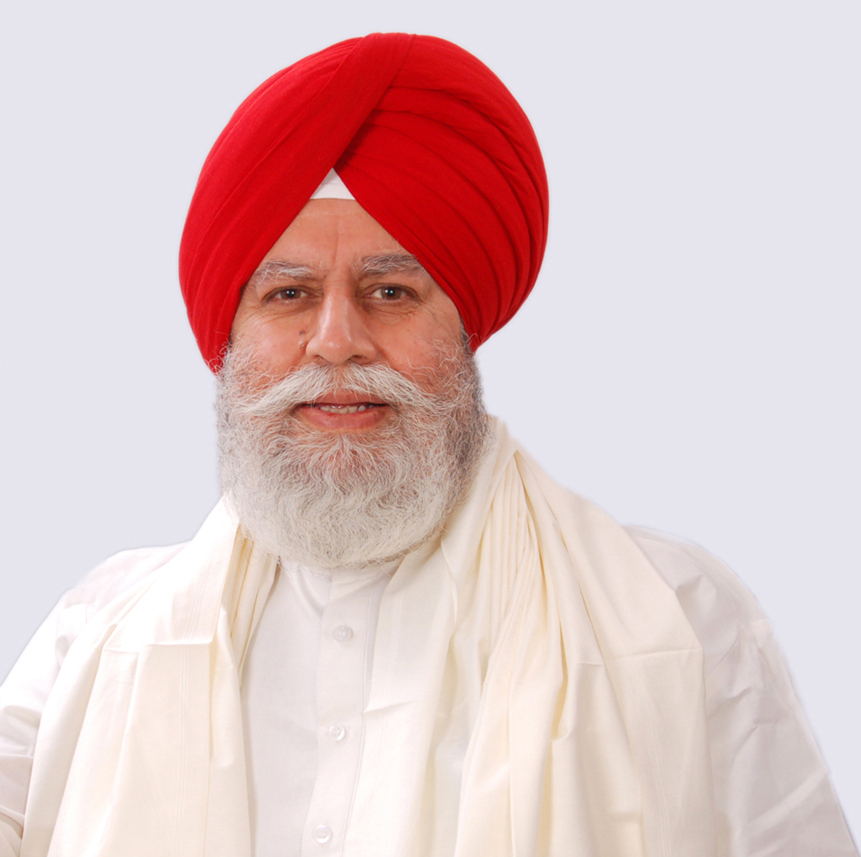

Deputy Leader of BJP Parliamentary Party in Rajya Sabha
- In office 2 June 2009 – 20 July 2012
- Leader: Arun Jaitley
- Succeeded by: Ravi Shankar Prasad

Union Minister of State Government of India
- 2018 – 2019: Electronics and Information Technology
- 2017 – 2018: Drinking Water and Sanitation
- 2016 – 2017: Parliamentary Affairs; Agriculture and Farmers Welfare
- 1995 – 1996: Parliamentary Affairs; Urban Affairs and Employment
Parliamentarian positions
Member of Parliament, Rajya Sabha
2000 ‍–‍ 2012	Jharkhand
1986 ‍–‍ 1998	Bihar
Member of the Indian Parliament for Bardhaman–Durgapur
In office 23 May 2019 – 4 June 2024
Preceded by	Mamtaz Sanghamita
Succeeded by	Kirti Azad
Member of the Indian Parliament for Darjeeling
In office 16 May 2014 – 23 May 2019
Preceded by	Jaswant Singh
Succeeded by	Raju Bista

Personal details
- Born: 4 July 1951 (age 75) Asansol, West Bengal, India
- Party: Bharatiya Janata Party (since 1999)
- Other political affiliations: Indian National Congress (until 1999)
- Spouse: Monica Ahluwalia (m. 1972)
- Children: 5
- Education: Burdwan University; University of Calcutta
- Profession: Social Worker
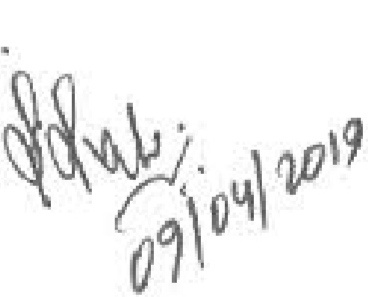
- Signature
- Website: Personal Website

Surendrajeet Singh Ahluwalia (born 4 July 1951) is an Indian politician of the Bharatiya Janata Party (BJP), and a senior Member of Parliament in his 32nd year as a Parliamentarian.

A former Union Minister of State in the Government of India, he is the member of Parliament of India representing Bardhaman-Durgapur Lok Sabha constituency in West Bengal in the 17th Lok Sabha (2019–2024). He represented Darjeeling, West Bengal in the 16th Lok Sabha, having been elected as its MP in the 2014 General Elections. Prior to entering the Lok Sabha in 2014, he was a Member of Parliament representing Bihar and Jharkhand in the Rajya Sabha, the upper house of the Indian Parliament over several terms, 1986–1992, 1992–1998 (as a member of Congress), and with BJP in 2000–2006, and 2006–2012.

During his term in the Rajya Sabha, he was Deputy Leader of the Opposition in the Rajya Sabha till 2012, and Chief Whip prior to that. After being elected to Lok Sabha in 2014, he has held various portfolios as Minister of State from 2016 to GE 2019.

== Education ==
Ahluwalia is a lawyer by education, having graduated from Calcutta University.

== Political career ==
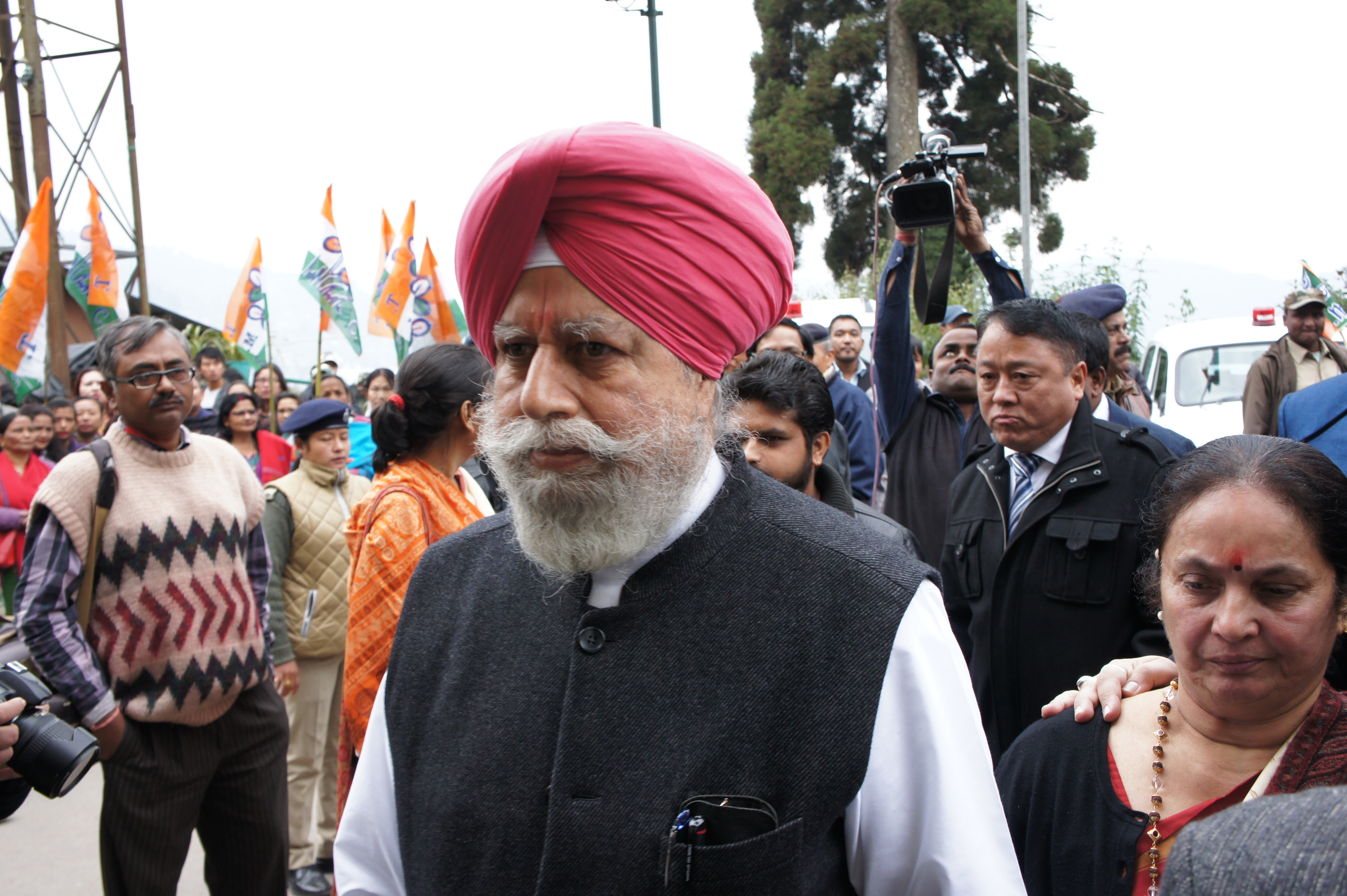
Filing nominations for the 2014 Darjeeling Lok Sabha Parliamentary constituency

Ahluwalia was a Member of Parliament from Rajya Sabha representing Bihar and Jharkhand in 1986–1992, 1992–1998, 2000–2006, and 2006–2012. He was elected to the Lok Sabha from the Darjeeling Parliamentary Constituency of West Bengal with active support of a local unrecognized party Gorkha Janmukti Morcha in May 2014.

He was first elected to the Rajya Sabha from Bihar in 1986 as a member of the Indian National Congress, and in the early years of his career, held the posts of Minister for Urban Development, and Minister of Parliamentary Affairs in the Union Government headed by P. V. Narasimha Rao. He subsequently joined BJP in 1999, where he has been since.

He served as Minister of State for Urban Affairs and Employment (Department of Urban Employment and Poverty Alleviation) and Parliamentary Affairs in P V Narasimha Rao Cabinet from 15 September 1995 to 16 May 1996. He was Deputy Leader of the Opposition in the Rajya Sabha from June 2010 to May 2012. He was inducted into the Union Council of Ministers as a Minister of State for Agriculture and Farmers Welfare and Parliamentary Affairs on 5 July 2016.

== Positions held ==
"Positions held".

- 1984 - 86 Member, the G.S. Dhillon Committee constituted by Government of India for providing relief and rehabilitation to the victims of the November 1984 riots in the country
- 1986 - 92 Member, Consultative Committee for the Ministry of Science and Technology Member, General Council of the Indian School of Mines, Dhanbad
- 1987 - 88 Member, Select Committee on Medical Council Bill
- April 2000 - 2001 Member, Consultative Committee for the Ministry of Agriculture
- Sept 2000 - Aug 2004 Member, Committee on Finance
- 2001 Member, Consultative Committee for the Ministry of Information Technology
- Aug 2001 - April 2006 and June 2006 onwards Member, Business Advisory Committee
- Jan 2002 - Feb. 2004 Member, Consultative Committee for the Ministry of Communications and Information Technology
- Aug 2002 - Aug. 2004 Member, Committee on Information Technology
- Jan 2003 - July 2004 Member, Committee of Privileges
- Aug 2004 - April 2006 and May 2006 onwards Member, Committee on Home Affairs
- Aug 2004 - April 2006 and June 2006 onwards Member, House Committee
- Sept 2004 - Oct 2007 Member, National Monitoring Committee for Minorities Education
- Oct 2004 - 2006 Member, Consultative Committee for the Ministry of Finance
- June 2006 - Sept 2006 Member, Committee on Rules
- Sept 2006 onwards Member, Committee of Privileges
- April 2007 onwards Convenor, Sub-Committee on Civil Defence and Rehabilitation of J and K Migrants of the Committee on Home Affairs
- Sept 2007 onwards Member, Committee on Finance & Member, Consultative Committee for the Ministry of Communications and Information Technology

=== Rajya Sabha ===
Position	Party	Constituency	From	To	Tenure
Member of Parliament, Rajya Sabha (1st Term)	INC(I)	Bihar	7 July 1986	6 July 1992	5 years, 365 days
Member of Parliament, Rajya Sabha (2nd Term)	INC(I)	Bihar	8 July 1992	7 July 1998	5 years, 364 days
Member of Parliament, Rajya Sabha (3rd Term)	BJP	Bihar	3 April 2000	14 November 2000	225 days
Member of Parliament, Rajya Sabha (4th Term)	BJP	Jharkhand	15 November 2000	2 April 2006	5 years, 138 days
Member of Parliament, Rajya Sabha (5th Term)	BJP	Jharkhand	3 April 2006	2 April 2012	5 years, 365 days

== Speeches and other contributions in international forums ==
- 1989 - Attended the United Nations High Commission for Refugees (UNHCR) Human Rights Conference in Geneva, Switzerland as Alternate Leader of the Indian Delegation.

Speech Transcripts from the Conference:
Violation of Human Rights in the Occupied Arab Territories including Palestine Speech Transcript
Right to Development Speech Transcript
Human Rights and Fundamental Freedoms Speech Transcript
Torture and Enforced Disappearances Speech Transcript
Report of Sub-Commission Speech Transcript
Freedom of Religion Speech Transcript

- 2002 - Attended the United Nations General Assembly (UNGA) in New York, USA as a Delegate.

Speech Transcripts from the Conference:
Promotion and Protection of the Rights of Children Speech Transcript
Social Development including questions relating to the World Speech Transcript
Gender Equality, development and peace for the 21st Century Speech Transcript

- 2002 - Attended the International Parliamentarians Association for Information Technology (IPAIT) I Conference in Seoul, Korea as Chair of the Steering Committee and moderated over Theme 2. Joint Communiqué
- 2002 - Attended the Commonwealth Parliamentary Association Conference in Windhoek, Namibia as Leader of the Indian Delegation. Speech Transcript
- 2008 - Attended the International Parliamentarians Association for Information Technology (IPAIT) VI Conference in Sofia, Bulgaria as vice-president of IPAIT. Joint Communiqué
- 2010 - IPU: (i) Served as Reporteur in the First Standing Committee on Peace & International Security in the 109th Assembly of IPU in Geneva. (ii) Served as vice-president of the Standing Committee on Democracy and Human Rights in the 122nd IPU Assembly in Bangkok, Thailand.
- 2012 April - Farewell speech in the Rajya Sabha upon his retirement. S.S Ahluwalia's Farewell Speech on YouTube

== Joint Parliamentary Committees (JPC) ==
- Aug 1992 - Member of Joint Parliamentary Committee to inquire into Irregularities in Securities and Banking Transactions
- April 2001 - Member of Joint Parliamentary Committee on Stock Market Scam and matters relating thereto
- August 2003 - Member of Joint Parliamentary Committee on pesticide residues in food products and safety standards for soft drinks, fruit juices and other beverages
- JPC on Pesticide residue in soft drinks
- Report on Pesticide residue in soft drinks
- March 2011 - Member of Joint Parliamentary Committee to probe the irregular allocation of 2G Spectrum
- June 2015 - chairman, Joint Committee of Parliament to look into provisions of Land Acquisition Amendment Bill 2015
