= Motahar Hossain (Indian politician) =

Indian politician

Dr. Motahar Hossain

Minister of State for Home, West Bengal

Member of West Bengal Legislative Assembly
- In office 1972–2001
- Preceded by: Bazle Ahmed
- Succeeded by: Dr. Qamre Elahi
- Constituency: Murarai

Personal details
- Born: May 1932 Bhimpur, Birbhum District, Bengal Presidency
- Died: November 20, 2011 (aged 79) Kolkata, West Bengal, India
- Party: Indian National Congress
- Children: Dr. Mosarraf Hossain
- Education: Calcutta Medical College
- Profession: Physician

Dr. Motahar Hossain (May 1932 – 20 November 2011) was an Indian National Congress who served in the West Bengal Legislative Assembly for nearly thirty years.

== Early life and education ==
Hossain was born in May 1932 to a Bengali Muslim family in the village of Bhimpur in the Birbhum District of the Bengal Presidency. He was the son of Qorban Hossain. He graduated with an MBBS degree from Calcutta Medical College in 1955. Hossain was the son-in-law of physician Dr. Mohammad Hossain and the father of physician Dr. Mosarraf Hossain.

== Career ==
Hossain was a physician by profession, serving as a house surgeon for two years before opening a private practice in Rampurhat in 1957. He served in various political roles such as the Pradhan of Andole Anchal Panchayet, the elected president of Murarai II Anchalik Council, and as a member of the Birbhum District Council. He was also the former vice-president of the Birbhum District School Board and Birbhum District Congress Council. Hossain was also a member of the West Bengal Pradesh Congress Committee and All India Congress Committee.

Hossain contested in the 1972 West Bengal Legislative Assembly election where he ran as an Indian National Congress candidate for Murarai Assembly constituency, winning against former MLA and Socialist Unity Centre of India (Communist) candidate Bazle Ahmed. He contested in the 1977 West Bengal Legislative Assembly election and was re-elected to Murarai after winning against Ahmed once again. Hossain contested in the 1982 West Bengal Legislative Assembly election and was re-elected to Murarai after winning against Communist Party of India (Marxist) politician Matiur Rahaman. He contested in the 1987 West Bengal Legislative Assembly election and was re-elected to Murarai after defeating Marxist politician Durgadas Ghosh. Hossain contested in the 1991 West Bengal Legislative Assembly election and was re-elected to Murarai after defeating Ghosh once again. He contested in the 1996 West Bengal Legislative Assembly election and was re-elected to Murarai after defeating Marxist politician Moazzem Hossain. Hossain contested in the 2001 West Bengal Legislative Assembly election and 2006 West Bengal Legislative Assembly election but lost to Dr. Qamre Elahi on both occasions.

Hossain served as Minister of State for Home in the West Bengal government of Siddhartha Shankar Ray.

== Death ==
He died in Kolkata on 20 November 2011.
