= Ganesh Dhimal =

Nepalese politician

The Honourable Ganesh Dhimal
- धिमाल धिमाल

Member of Parliament, Pratinidhi Sabha
- Incumbent
- Assumed office 26 March 2026
- Preceded by: Achyut Prasad Mainali
- Constituency: Bara 1

Personal details
- Citizenship: Nepalese
- Party: Rastriya Swatantra Party
- Education: CMJ University (Phd)
- Profession: Politician

Ganesh Dhimal (Nepali: गणेश धिमाल) is a Nepalese politician serving as a member of parliament from the Rastriya Swatantra Party. He is the member of the 7th Pratinidhi Sabha elected from Bara 1 constituency in 2026 Nepalese General Election securing 39,998 votes and defeating his closest contender Shambu Bahadur Budathoki of the Nepali Congress. He holds Phd in Sociology from CMJ University, India.
