= Mamtaz Sanghamita =

Indian politician (1946–2026)

Member of Parliament, Lok Sabha
- In office May 2014 – May 2019
- Preceded by: Saidul Haque
- Succeeded by: S. S. Ahluwalia
- Constituency: Bardhaman-Durgapur

Personal details
- Born: 16 January 1946
- Died: 27 August 2026 (aged 80) Kolkata, West Bengal, India
- Party: Trinamool Congress
- Spouse: Nurey Alam Chowdhury
- Parent: Syed Abdul Mansur Habibullah (father)
- Profession: Medical Practitioner/Professor

Mamtaz Sanghamita (16 January 1946 – 27 August 2026) was an Indian gynaecologist and politician. She was a member of parliament to the 16th Lok Sabha from Bardhaman-Durgapur (Lok Sabha constituency), West Bengal. Sanghamita won the 2014 Indian general election being an All India Trinamool Congress candidate.

Mamtaz Sanghamita was the daughter of the late Syed Abdul Mansur Habibullah, a Speaker of the West Bengal assembly and a Law Minister, and Maqsooda Khatoon, an educationist.

She was head of the department of gynaecology at Calcutta Medical College and Hospital.

== Early life ==
Sanghamita attended the Municipal Girls School in Bardhaman and the Brahmo Balika Shikshalaya in Kolkata from where she passed out in first division securing letter in four subjects. She completed Pre-Medical from Bethune College. Sanghamita obtained MB BS from Calcutta Medical College in 1968. This was followed by DGO in 1970 from the University of Calcutta and MD (OTG) from Delhi University. She went to UK for higher studies.

== Personal life and death ==
In 1975, she married Nurey Alam Chowdhury, a barrister and later a Cabinet Minister in the State Government. Their only daughter, Shabana Roze, has a MB BS from National Medical College and is pursuing higher medical research.

Sanghamita died on 27 August 2026, at the age of 80.
