= Triloki Prasad =

Nepalese politician

Honourable Triloki Prasad
- त्रिलोकी प्रसाद

Province Assembly Member of Madhesh Province
- Incumbent
- Assumed office 2017
- Preceded by: N/A
- Constituency: Bara 1 (constituency)

Personal details
- Born: May 2, 1958 (age 67)
- Party: CPN (Unified Marxist–Leninist)
- Occupation: Politician

Triloki Prasad (Nepali: त्रिलोकी प्रसाद) is a Nepalese politician. He is a member of Provincial Assembly of Madhesh Province from CPN (Unified Marxist–Leninist). Prasad, a resident of Kolhabi, was elected via 2017 Nepalese provincial elections from Bara 1(A).

== Electoral history ==
=== 2017 Nepalese provincial elections ===
Party	Candidate	Votes
CPN (Unified Marxist–Leninist)	Triloki Prasad	18,445
Nepali Congress	Pema Siddhi Lama	16,484
Federal Socialist Forum, Nepal	Suresh Baitha	2,478
Others		675
Invalid votes		1,188
Result	CPN (UML) gain	
Source: Election Commission
