= Achyut Prasad Mainali =

Nepali politician

- अच्युत प्रसाद मैनाली

Member of Parliament, Pratinidhi Sabha
- In office 22 December 2022 – 12 September 2025
- Preceded by: Umakant Chaudhary
- Succeeded by: Ganesh Dhimal
- Constituency: Bara 1

Personal details
- Born: 3 July 1965 (age 60) Bara District
- Party: CPN (UML)

Achyut Prasad Mainali is a Nepalese politician belonging to the CPN (UML) who served as a member of the Pratinidhi Sabha. In the 2022 Nepalese general election, he was elected from Bara 1.
