= Syed Abul Mansur Habibullah =

Indian politician

Speaker of the West Bengal Legislative Assembly
- In office 1977–1982

Member of the West Bengal Legislative Assembly
- In office 1969–1991
- Constituency: Nadanghat

Minister of Law, Government of West Bengal
- In office 1982–1987

Personal details
- Born: 17 November 1917 Bardhaman, Bengal Presidency, British India (now Bardhaman, West Bengal, India)
- Died: 14 September 1996 (aged 78) Calcutta (now Kolkata), West Bengal, India
- Party: Communist Party of India (Marxist)
- Spouse: Maqsuda Khatun
- Relations: Noor Alam Chowdhury (son-in-law)
- Children: Mamtaz Sanghamita (daughter)
- Education: University of Calcutta; Scottish Church College
- Occupation: Professor at University of Calcutta; Politician

Syed Abul Mansur Habibullah (17 November 1917 – 14 September 1996), also known as S. A. M. Habibullah, was an Indian politician. He was the Speaker of the West Bengal Legislative Assembly from 24 June 1977 to 13 June 1982. He was Member of the West Bengal Legislative Assembly from the Nadanghat Assembly constituency since 1969 to 1991. He was law minister in West Bengal since 1982 to 1987. He was associated with the Communist Party of India (Marxist).

His daughter Mumtaz Sanghamita was a Lok Sabha Member from the Bardhaman-Durgapur Lok Sabha constituency.
