= Bazle Ahmed =

Indian politician and trade unionist

Member of West Bengal Legislative Assembly
- In office 1967–1972
- Preceded by: Shamsuddin Ahammad
- Succeeded by: Dr. Motahar Hossain
- Constituency: Murarai

Personal details
- Born: Birbhum district, Bengal Presidency
- Party: Socialist Unity Centre of India (Communist)

Bazle Ahmad was an Indian politician and trade unionist, belonging to the Socialist Unity Centre of India. By the mid-1960, he served as president of the UTUC (Lenin Sarani)-affiliated Sahebganj Loop Rail Sramik Union. He represented the Murarai constituency in the West Bengal Legislative Assembly 1967–1972. In the 1967 West Bengal Legislative Assembly election, he obtained 14,944 votes (41.37%). In the 1969 West Bengal Legislative Assembly election, he obtained 22,766 votes (54.14%). As a legislator he managed to convince the state government to set up a tertiary educational facility in his constituency, leading to the foundation of the Kabi Nazrul College. In the 1971 West Bengal Legislative Assembly election, he obtained 16,310 votes (53.73%). Bazle Ahmed lost the Murarai seat in the 1972 West Bengal Legislative Assembly election, finishing in second place with 11,627 votes (29.49%).

Bazle Ahmed stood as a Communist Party of India (Marxist) candidate and finished in second place in the election in Murarai in the 1977 West Bengal Legislative Assembly election, with 16,755 votes (34.73%). He confronted, among others, former SUCI party comrade and the erstwhile general secretary of the Sahebganj Loop Rail Sramik Union general secretary Ziad Buxi.
