= Banshlai Bridge railway station =

Railway station in West Bengal, India

Coordinates: 24°29′07.41″N 87°51′28.66″E

Banshlai Bridge
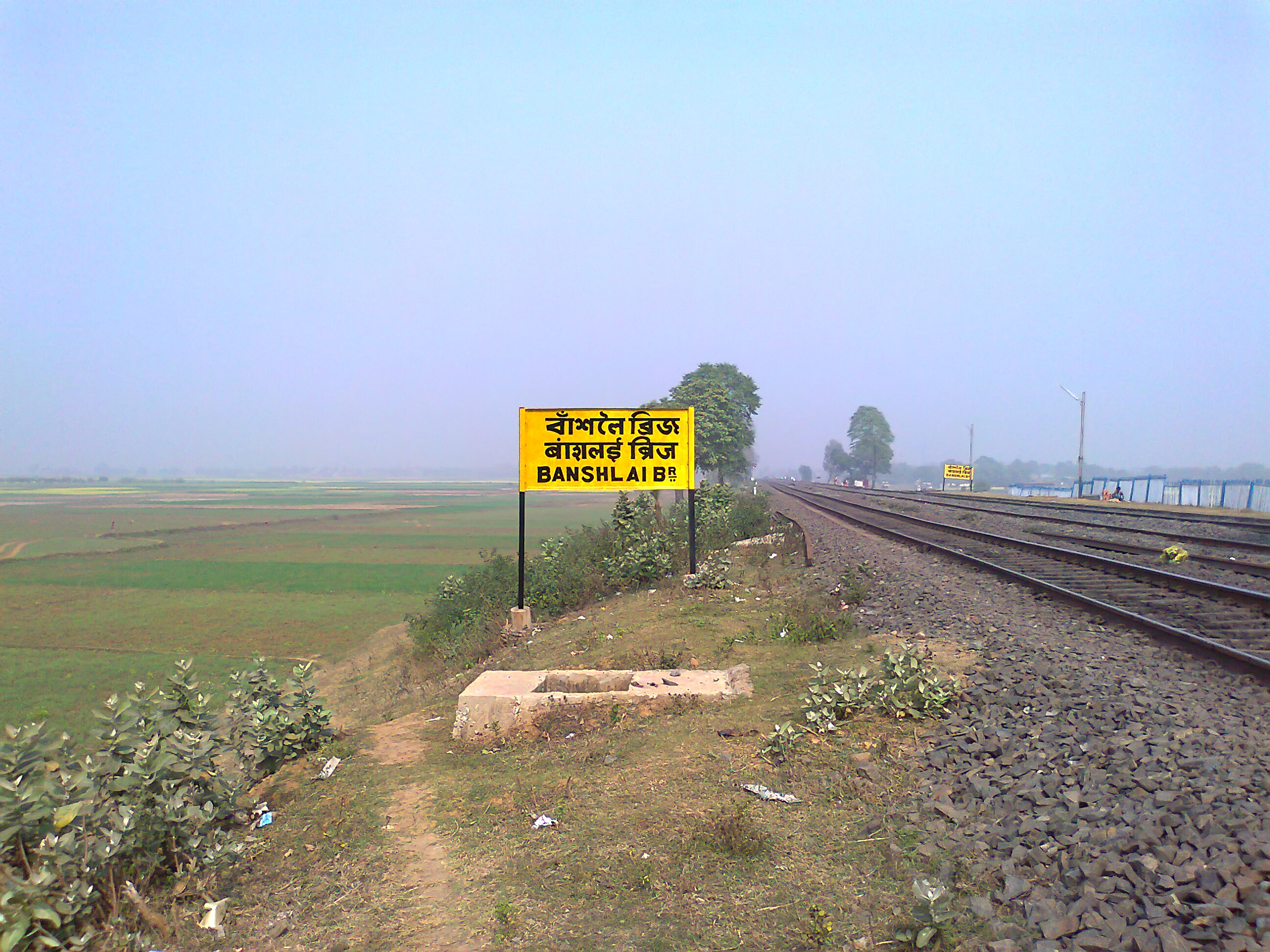

General information
- Location: SH 5, West Bengal; India
- Elevation: 35 metres (115 ft)
- System: Indian Railways station
- Owner: Indian Railways
- Line: Rampurhat-Malda Town Section
- Platforms: 2
- Tracks: 3

Construction
- Structure type: Standard

Other information
- Station code: BSBR
- Zone(s): Eastern Railways
- Division(s): Howrah

History
- Former names: East India Railway
Location
- Location within West Bengal Location within India

Banshlai Bridge railway station is a small halt station that is on the Rampurhat-Malda Town section, located on the banks of Bansloi River in Birbhum district, West Bengal.

Banshlai Bridge
Next station west: Rajgram	Indian Railways : Sahibganj loop			Next station east: Murarai
Next station west: Rajgram	Stop no. 51	km from start 0	Platforms 2	Next station east: Murarai
