= Murarai I =

- Community development block
- Interactive map of Murarai I
- Coordinates: 24.376889°N 87.851111°E
- Country: India
- State: West Bengal
- District: Birbhum
- Parliamentary constituency: Birbhum
- Assembly constituency: Murarai

Area
  - Total: 175.51 km^{2} (67.76 sq mi)

Population (2011)
  - Total: 190,802
  - Density: 1,087.1/km^{2} (2,815.7/sq mi)
- Time zone: UTC+5.30 (IST)
- PIN: 731219 (Murarai)
- Telephone/STD code: 03465
- Literacy Rate: 55.67 per cent
- Website: http://birbhum.nic.in/

Murarai I is a community development block that forms an administrative division in Rampurhat subdivision of Birbhum district in the Indian state of West Bengal.

== Overview ==
Birbhum district is physiographically a part of the ancient Rarh region. The western portion of the district is basically an extension of the Chota Nagpur Plateau. The area has mostly loose reddish lateritic low fertility soil. In the east, the flood plains of the major rivers, such as the Ajay, Bakreshwar, Mayurakshi and Brahmani, have soft alluvial soil. The forest cover is only 3.5% of the total district. Although coal is found in the district and Bakreshwar Thermal Power Station has a capacity of 2,010 MW, the economic condition of Birbhum is dominated by agriculture. From 1977 onwards majorland reforms took place in West Bengal. Land in excess of land ceiling was acquired and distributed amongst the peasants. In Birbhum district, 19,968 hectares of vested agricultural land has been distributed amongst 161,515 beneficiaries, till 2011. However, more than 38% of the operational land holding is marginal or less than 1 acre. The proportion of agricultural labourers amongst total workers in Birbhum district is 45.9%, the highest amongst all districts of West Bengal. Culturally rich Birbhum, with such traditional landmarks as Jaydev Kenduli and Chandidas Nanoor, is home to Visva-Bharati University at Santiniketan, having close association with two Nobel laureates – Rabindranath Tagore and Amartya Sen.

== Geography ==
Map of Birbhum district showing community development block and municipal areas. Click on the map to view a larger version.

Chatra, a constituent panchayat of Murarai I block, is located at 24.376889°N 87.851111°E.

Murarai I Block is part of the Nalhati Plain, one of the four sub-micro physiographic regions occupying the northern portion of Birbhum district. There are hills along the western boundary with Jharkhand. These are extensions of the Rajmahal hills.

Murarai I CD Block is bounded by Pakur CD Block, in Pakur district of Jharkhand, on the north, Murarai II CD Block on the east, Nalhati I CD Block on the south and Maheshpur CD Block in Pakur district of Jharkhand on the west.

Murarai I CD Block has an area of 175.51 km^{2}. It has 1 panchayat samity, 7 gram panchayats, 87 gram sansads (village councils), 85 mouzas and 80 inhabited villages, as per the District Statistical Handbook, Birbhum, 2008. Murarai police station serves this block. The headquarters of this CD Block is at Murarai.

The gram panchayats of Murarai I block/panchayat samiti are: Chatra, Dumurgram, Gorsha, Mohurapur, Murarai, Palsa and Rajgram.

== Demographics ==
=== Population ===
As per the 2011 Census of India, Murarai I CD Block had a total population of 190,802, of which 167,941 were rural and 22,861 were urban. here were 97,510 (51%) males and 93,292 (49%) females. Population below 6 years was 30,514. Scheduled Castes numbered 46,932 (24.60%) and Scheduled Tribes numbered 8,708 (4.56%).

As per 2001 census, Murarai I block had a total population of 154,282, out of which 79,193 were males and 75,087 were females. Murarai I block registered a population growth of 25.90 per cent during the 1991-2001 decade. Decadal growth for Birbhum district was 17.88 per cent. Decadal growth in West Bengal was 17.84 per cent.

Census Towns in Murarai I CD Block are (2011 census figures in brackets): Murarai (5,770), Barua Gopalpur (6,614) and Ambhua (10,477).

Large villages (with 4,000+ population) in Murarai I CD Block are (2011 census figures in brackets): Birnagar (4,699), Mahurapur (5,348), Santoshpur (4,910), Gorsa (7,964), Rajgram (8,378), Palsa (5,417), Dhitora (9,081), Ramchandrapur (5,226), Bhadiswar (7,723) and Dumurgram (8,335).

Other villages in Murarai I CD Block include (2011 census figures in brackets): Chatra (2,733).

=== Literacy ===
As per the 2011 census the total number of literates in Murarai I CD Block was 89,238 (55.67% of the population over 6 years) out of which males numbered 49,620 (60.47% of the male population over 6 years) and females numbered 39,628 (50.66% of the female population over 6 years). The gender disparity (the difference between female and male literacy rates) was 9.81%.

See also – List of West Bengal districts ranked by literacy rate

Literacy in CD blocks of
Birbhum district
Rampurhat subdivision
Murarai I – 55.67%
Murarai II – 58.28%
Nalhati I – 69.83%
Nalhati II – 71.68%
Rampurhat I – 73.29%
Rampurhat II – 70.77%
Mayureswar I – 71.52%
Mayureswar II – 70.89%
Suri Sadar subdivision
Mohammad Bazar – 65.18%
Rajnagar – 68.10%
Suri I – 72.75%
Suri II – 72.75%
Sainthia – 72.33%
Dubrajpur – 68.26%
Khoyrasol – 68.75%
Bolpur subdivision
Bolpur Sriniketan – 70.67%
Ilambazar – 74.27%
Labpur – 71.20%
Nanoor – 69.45%
2011 Census: CD Block Wise

Primary Census Abstract Data

=== Language and religion ===
Religion in Murarai I CD block (2011)
Islam	58.92%
Hinduism	40.58%
Other or not stated	0.50%

In the 2011 census, Muslims numbered 112,429 and formed 58.92% of the population in Murarai I CD Block. Hindus numbered 77,428 and formed 40.58% of the population. Christians numbered 485 and formed 0.25% of the population. Others numbered 460 and formed 0.24% of the population.

The proportion of Hindus in Birbhum district has declined from 72.2% in 1961 to 62.3% in 2011. The proportion of Muslims in Birbhum district has increased from 27.6% to 37.1% during the same period. Christians formed 0.3% in 2011.

Languages in Murarai I CD block (2011)
1. Bengali (94.8%)
2. Santali (4.37%)
3. Others (0.84%)

At the time of the 2011 census, 94.79% of the population spoke Bengali and 4.37% Santali as their first language.

== Rural poverty ==
As per the BPL household survey carried out in 2005, the proportion of households below the poverty line (BPL) in Murarai I CD Block was 50.2%, against 42.3% in Birbhum district. In six CD Blocks – Murarai II, Nalhati II, Rampurhat II, Rampurhat I, Suri II and Murarai I – the proportion of BPL families was more than 50%. In three CD Blocks – Rajnagar, Suri I and Labhpur – the proportion of BPL families was less than 30%. The other ten CD Blocks in Birbhum district were placed in between. According to the District Human Development Report, Birbhum, "Although there is no indication that the share of BPL households is more in blocks with higher share of agricultural labourer, there is a clear pattern that the share of BPL households is more in blocks with disadvantaged population in general and Muslim population in particular." (The disadvantaged population includes scheduled castes, scheduled tribes, and Muslims.)

== Economy ==
=== Livelihood ===
Livelihood
in Murarai I CD Block
1. Cultivators (11.8%)
2. Agricultural labourers (41.7%)
3. Household industries (10.5%)
4. Other Workers (36.1%)

In Murarai I CD Block in 2011, amongst the class of total workers, cultivators numbered 7,792 and formed 11.80%, agricultural labourers numbered 27,508 and formed 41.66%, household industry workers numbered 6,917 and formed 10.48% and other workers numbered 23,806 and formed 36.06%. Total workers numbered 66,023 and formed 34.60% of the total population, and non-workers numbered 124,779 and formed 65.40% of the population.

Note: In the census records a person is considered a cultivator, if the person is engaged in cultivation/ supervision of land owned by self/government/institution. When a person who works on another person’s land for wages in cash or kind or share, is regarded as an agricultural labourer. Household industry is defined as an industry conducted by one or more members of the family within the household or village, and one that does not qualify for registration as a factory under the Factories Act. Other workers are persons engaged in some economic activity other than cultivators, agricultural labourers and household workers. It includes factory, mining, plantation, transport and office workers, those engaged in business and commerce, teachers, entertainment artistes and so on.

=== Infrastructure ===
There are 76 inhabited villages in Murarai I CD Block, as per District Census Handbook, Birbhum, 2011. 100% villages have power supply. 76 villages (100%) have drinking water supply. 20 villages (26.32%) have post offices. 72 villages (94.74%) have telephones (including landlines, public call offices and mobile phones). 30 villages (39.47%) have a pucca (paved) approach road and 26 villages (34.21%) have transport communication (includes bus service, rail facility and navigable waterways). 10 villages (13.16%) have agricultural credit societies and 6 villages (7.89%) have banks.

=== Agriculture ===
Following land reforms land ownership pattern has undergone transformation. In 2004-05 (the agricultural labourer data is for 2001), persons engaged in agriculture in Murarai I CD Block could be classified as follows: bargadars 1,987 (4.95%), patta (document) holders 6,382 (15.88%), small farmers (possessing land between 1 and 2 hectares) 5,602 (13.94%), marginal farmers (possessing land up to 1 hectare) 8,500 (21.15%) and agricultural labourers 17,710 (44.08%).

Birbhum is a predominantly paddy cultivation-based agricultural district. The area under paddy cultivation in 2010-11 was 249,000 hectares of land. Paddy is grown in do, suna and sali classes of land. There is double to triple cropping system for paddy cultivation. Other crops grown in Birbhum are gram, masuri, peas, wheat, linseed, khesari, til, sugarcane and occasionally cotton. 192,470 hectares of cultivable land is under irrigation by different sources, such as canals, tanks, river lift irrigation and different types of tubewells. In 2009-10, 158,380 hectares were irrigated by canal water. There are such major irrigation projects as Mayurakshi and Hijli. Other rivers such as Ajoy, Brahmani, Kuskurni, Dwaraka, Hingla and Kopai are also helpful for irrigation in the district.

In 2013-14, there were 152 fertiliser depots, 5 seed stores and 42 fair price shops in Murarai I CD block.

In 2013-14, Murarai I CD block produced 4,241 tonnes of Aman paddy, the main winter crop, from 1,449 hectares, 5,438 tonnes of Boro paddy (spring crop) from 51,375 hectares, 7,687 tonnes of wheat from 3,052 hectares and 69,218 tonnes of potatoes from 2,027 hectares. It also produced pulses and oilseeds.

In 2013-14, the total area irrigated in Murarai I CD block was 8,175 hectares, out of which 152 hectares were irrigated by tank water, 300 hectares by river lift irrigation, 5,290 hectares by deep tube wells, 2,430 hectares by shallow tube wells and 3 hectares by other means.

=== Banking ===
In 2013-14, Murarai I CD block had offices of 6 commercial banks and 3 gramin banks.

=== Other sectors ===
According to the District Human Development Report, 2009, Birbhum is one of the most backward districts of West Bengal in terms of industrial development. Of the new industrial projects set-up in West Bengal between 1991 and 2005, only 1.23% came to Birbhum. Bakreshwar Thermal Power Station is the only large-scale industry in the district and employs about 5,000 people. There are 4 medium-scale industries and 4,748 registered small-scale industries.

The proportion of workers engaged in agriculture in Birbhum has been decreasing. According to the District Human Development Report, “more people are now engaged in non-agricultural activities, such as fishing, retail sales, vegetable vending, selling milk, and so on. As all these activities are at the lower end of the spectrum of marketable skills, it remains doubtful if these activities generate enough return for their family’s sustenance.”

=== Backward Regions Grant Fund ===
Birbhum district is listed as a backward region and receives financial support from the Backward Regions Grant Fund. The fund, created by the Government of India, is designed to redress regional imbalances in development. As of 2012, 272 districts across the country were listed under this scheme. The list includes 11 districts of West Bengal.

== Transport ==
Murarai I CD block has 7 originating/ terminating bus routes.

The Khana-Barharwa section of Sahibganj loop passes through this block. There are stations at Rajgram, Banshlai Bridge, Murarai and Chatra.

SH 7, running from Rajgram to Midnapore, passes through Murarai and Bhadiswar Road/ Raghunathpur-Murarai Road links Murarai to National Highway 114A at Umarpur.

== Education ==
In 2013-14, Murarai I CD block had 98 primary schools with 15,122 students, 27 middle schools with 1.093 students, 8 high schools with 8,054 students and 7 higher secondary schools with 10.339 students. Murarai I CD Block had 1 general degree college with 2,912 students, 2 technical/ professional institutions with 406 students and 283 institutions for special and non-formal education with 16,929 students

As per the 2011 census, in Murarai I CD Block, amongst the 76 inhabited villages, 3 villages did not have a school, 25 villages had more than 1 primary school, 37 villages had at least 1 primary and 1 middle school and 13 villages had at least 1 middle and 1 secondary school. 5 villages had senior secondary schools. There was a degree college of arts, science and commerce in Murarai I CD Block.

Kabi Nazrul College was established at Murarai in 1985.

Murarai Government Polytechnic was established at Murarai in 2015.

== Healthcare ==
In 2014, Murarai I CD Block had 1 rural hospital and 2 primary health centres with total 83 beds and 4 doctors (excluding private bodies). It had 27 family welfare subcentres. 11,238 patients were treated indoor and 72,744 patients were treated outdoor in the hospitals, health centres and subcentres of the CD block.

As per 2011 census, in Murarai I CD Block, 2 villages had community health centres, 2 villages had primary health centres, 20 villages had primary health subcentres, 3 villages had maternity and child welfare centres, 1 village had a veterinary hospital, 6 villages had medicine shops and out of the 76 inhabited villages 41 villages had no medical facilities.

Murarai Rural Hospital at Murarai has 50 beds. There are primary health centres at Rajgram (10 beds) and Chatra (6 beds).
