= Balbir Prasad Chaudhary =

Nepali politician

- बलबीर प्रसाद चौधरी

Member of the Constituent Assembly
- In office 21 January 2014 – 14 October 2017
- Preceded by: Umakant Chaudhary
- Succeeded by: Constituency abolished
- Constituency: Bara 5

Personal details
- Party: Communist Party of Nepal (Unified Marxist–Leninist)

Balbir Prasad Chaudhary (Nepali: बलबीर प्रसाद चौधरी) is a member of the 2nd Nepalese Constituent Assembly. He won the Bara 5 seat in CA assembly, 2013 from the Communist Party of Nepal (Unified Marxist–Leninist).
