= Umakant Chaudhary =

Nepalese politician

- उमाकान्त चौधरी
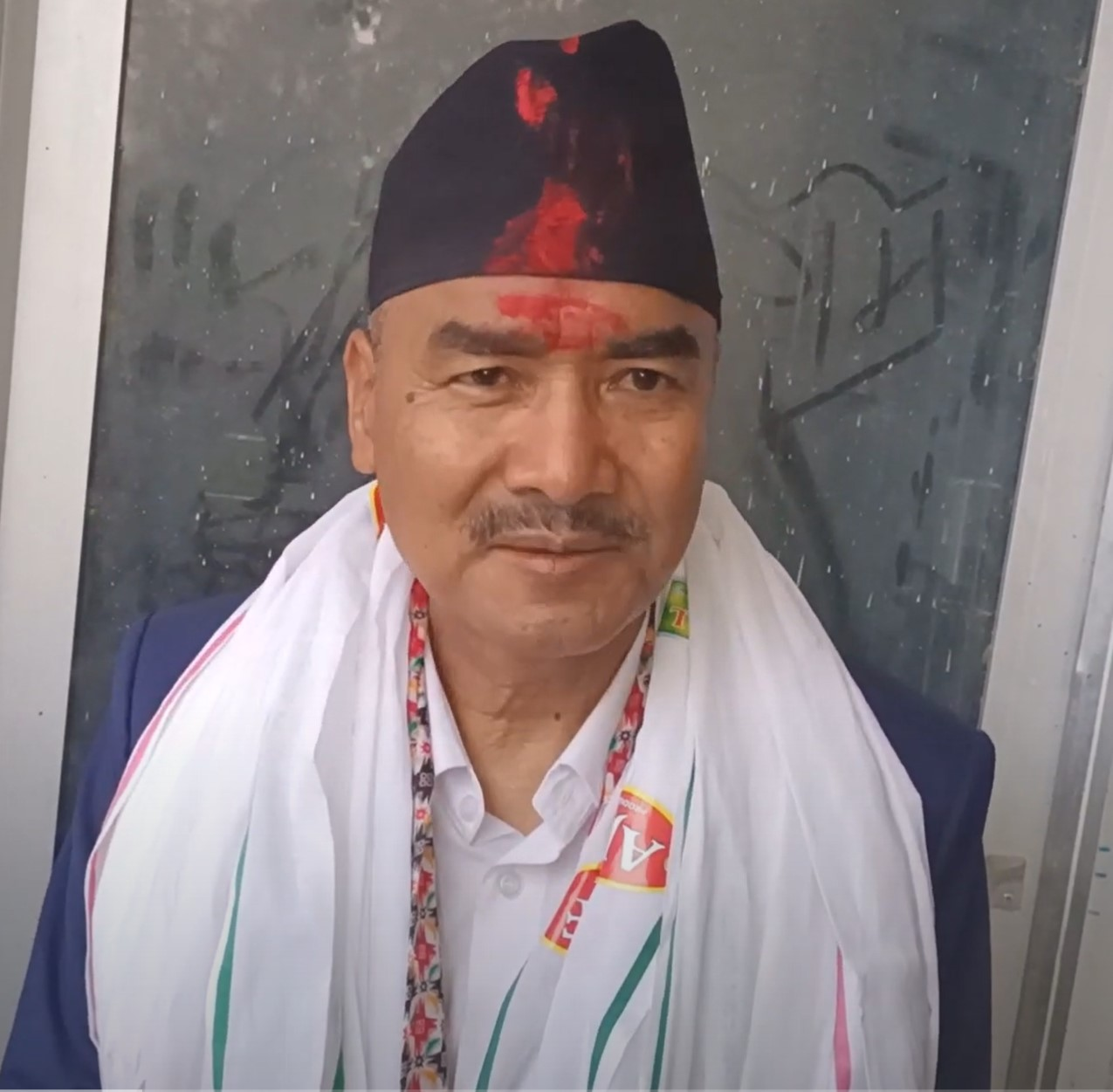

Deputy General Secretary of Nepali Congress
- Incumbent
- Assumed office 17 December 2021
- Preceded by: Prakash Sharan Mahat

Minister for Water Supply
- In office 8 October 2021 – 25 December 2022
- President: Bidya Devi Bhandari
- Prime Minister: Sher Bahadur Deuba

Member of Parliament, Pratinidhi Sabha
- In office 4 March 2018 – 18 September 2022
- Preceded by: Ram Ayodhya Prasad Yadav (as Member of the Constituent Assembly)
- Succeeded by: Achyut Prasad Mainali
- Constituency: Bara 1
- In office 28 April 2006 – 16 January 2008
- Preceded by: Himself (2002)
- Succeeded by: Saroj Kumar Yadav (as Member of the Constituent Assembly)
- Constituency: Bara 1
- In office 23 June 1999 – 22 May 2002
- Preceded by: Mukunda Neupane
- Succeeded by: Himself (2006)
- Constituency: Bara 1

Member of the Constituent Assembly
- In office 28 May 2008 – 28 May 2012
- Preceded by: Constituency created
- Succeeded by: Balbir Prasad Chaudhary
- Constituency: Bara 5

Personal details
- Born: 31 August 1966 (age 59) Bara, Nepal
- Party: Nepali Congress
- Spouse: Gayatri Devi Tharuni
- Children: 4
- Parents: Chandrika Prasad Chaudhary (father); Madeshiya Devi Chaudhary (mother)

Umakant Chaudhary (Nepali: उमाकान्त चौधरी) is a Nepalese politician and the former minister for Water Supply of Nepal. He was elected to the Pratinidhi Sabha in the 2017 election on behalf of the Nepali Congress.

He was appointed in 2004 as minister of state for agriculture and cooperation. In 2009 he became Health Minister. He hails from Bara and elected from Bara 1.

== Electoral history ==
=== 2017 legislative elections ===
Bara 1
Party	Candidate	Votes
Nepali Congress	Umakant Chaudhary	24,450
CPN (Unified Marxist–Leninist)	Achyut Prasad Mainali	22,030
Rastriya Janata Party Nepal	Ram Kishore Prasad Yadav	20,144
Others		598
Invalid votes		3,004
Result	Congress hold	
Source: Election Commission

=== 1999 legislative elections ===
Bara 1
Party	Candidate	Votes
Nepali Congress	Umakant Chaudhary	23,601
CPN (Unified Marxist–Leninist)	Mukunda Neupane	20,646
Nepal Sadbhawana Party	Parmananda Prasad Yadav	4,890
CPN (Marxist–Leninist)	Chabi Lal Uprety	2,363
Rastriya Prajatantra Party	Raj Narayan Sah Teli	2,136
Others		553
Invalid Votes		1,340
Result	Congress gain	
Source: Election Commission
