= Qamre Elahi =

West Bengali politician

Dr. Qamre Elahi

Member of West Bengal Legislative Assembly
- In office 2001–2011
- Preceded by: Dr. Motahar Hossain
- Succeeded by: Noor Alam Chowdhury
- Constituency: Murarai

Personal details
- Born: January 21, 1961 (age 65) Birbhum district, Bengal Presidency
- Party: Communist Party of India (Marxist)
- Education: University of Calcutta

Mohammed Qamre Elahi (born 21 January 1961) was an Indian politician belonging to the Communist Party of India (Marxist). He served as a member of the West Bengal Legislative Assembly for over a decade.

== Early life and family ==
Mohammed Qamre Elahi was born on 21 January 1961 to a Bengali Muslim family in the village of Baraturigram in Birbhum district, Bengal Presidency. He was the son of Mohammad Fazle Elahi and obtained his MBBS from the University of Calcutta.

== Career ==
Qamre Elahi contested in the 2001 West Bengal Legislative Assembly election where he ran as a Communist Party of India (Marxist) candidate for Murarai Assembly constituency, winning against Trinamool politician Dr. Motahar Hossain. He contested in the 2006 West Bengal Legislative Assembly election and was re-elected to Murarai after winning against Hossain once again. Hossain contested in the 2011 West Bengal Legislative Assembly election but lost to Trinamool politician Noor Alam Chowdhury.
