= Murarai railway station =

Railway Station in West Bengal, India

Murarai
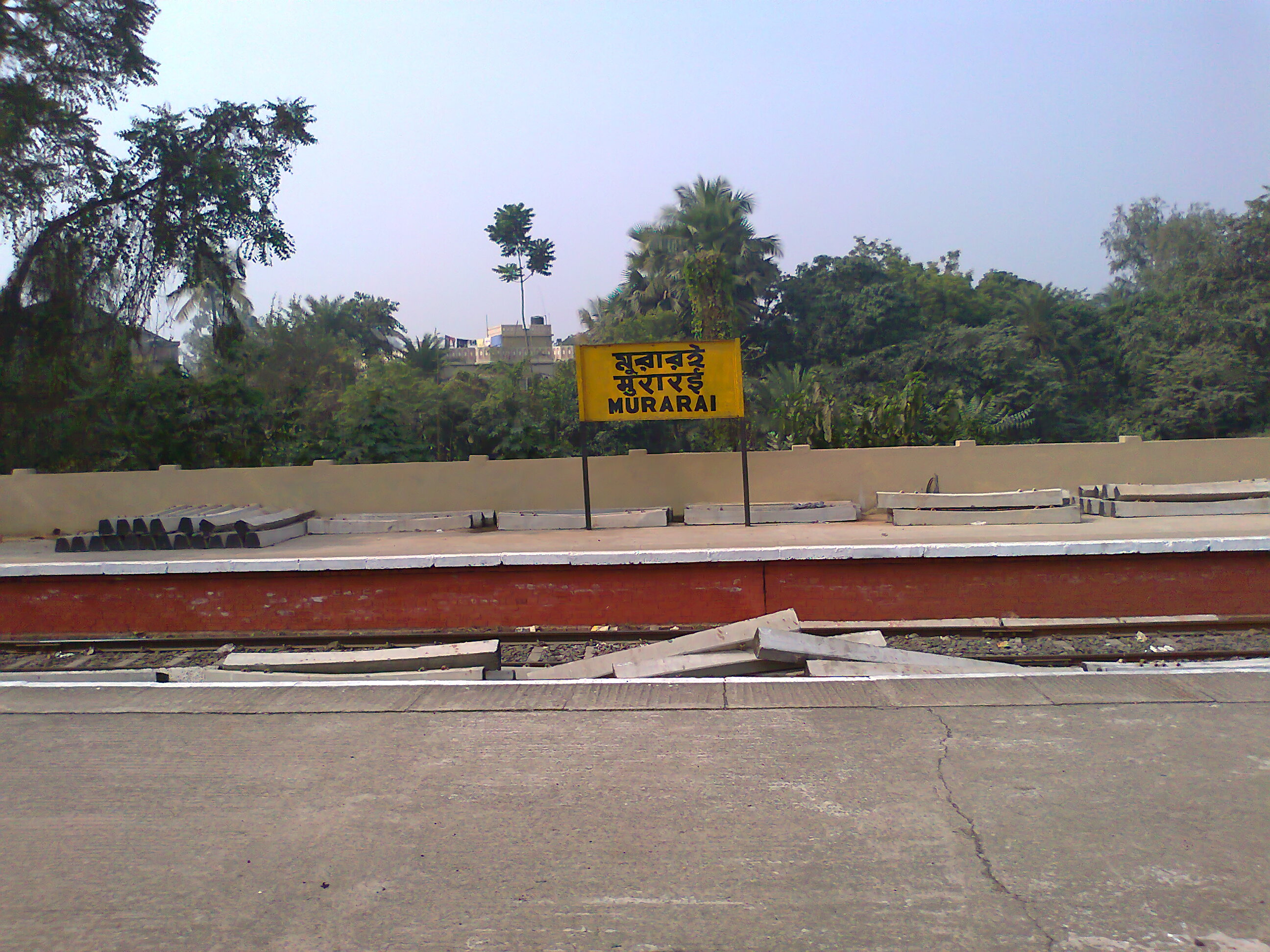

General information
- Location: Murarai, West Bengal; India
- Coordinates: 24°26′27″N 87°51′30″E
- Elevation: 36 metres (118 ft)
- System: Indian Railways station
- Owner: Indian Railways
- Operator: Indian Railways
- Line: Rampurhat-Malda Town Section
- Platforms: 3
- Tracks: 4

Construction
- Structure type: At grade
- Parking: Available
- Accessible: Disabled access

Other information
- Station code: MRR
- Zone(s): Eastern Railway
- Division(s): Howrah
- Fare zone: Howrah division
- Classification: NSG-5

History
- Opened: 1866-67
- Former names: East India Railway
Location
- Location within India Location within West Bengal

Murarai Railway Station is located on the Rampurhat-Malda Town section in Murarai, West Bengal. It serves the town of Murarai, which is part of the Murarai I community development block. The station has three platforms, and 26 trains stop there. It is classified as a NSG 5 (Non-Suburban Group) category station under Howrah Division.

== New railway track ==
The third railway track connecting Rampurhat and Murarai was completed in October 2023. The speed limit on the Rampurhat-Murarai section is currently 110 km/h, with plans to increase it to 130 km/h in the 2025-26 financial year. Construction of the proposed third line for the Murarai-Pakur-Gumani section in the Howrah division is expected to begin soon.

== Revenue ==
Revenue Details of Murarai railway station
Financial Year	Category	Revenue (INR)	Approximate Value
2024–25	Reservation Tickets – PRS	₹18,498,165	Nearly ₹1.85 crore
2024–25	Unreserved Tickets – UTS	₹37,517,360	Nearly ₹3.75 crore
2024–25	Total ( PRS + UTS )	₹56,015,525	Nearly ₹5.60 crore
2023–24	Total ( PRS+UTS)	₹45,790,103	Nearly ₹4.58 crore

It is fifth in revenue generation in Birbhum district, after Rampurhat, Bolpur, Sainthia, and Suri.

== Major trains ==
- Gour Express
- Vananchal Express
- Howrah–Malda Town Intercity Express
- Tebhaga Express
- Kanchanjungha Express

== Trains that are not restored yet ==
- 13119/20 Sealdah - Anvt Upper India Express (2 days a week)
- 13133/34 Sealdah - Varanasi Upper India Express (5 days a week)
- 53043/44 Howrah - Rajgir Fast Passenger (daily)
- 53417/18 Bardhaman - Malda Town Passenger (daily)
- 53137/18 Rampurhat - Barharwa Passenger (daily)

== See also ==
- Nalhati Junction railway station
- Rampurhat Junction railway station
- Malda Town Station
- List of railway stations in India

Murarai
Next station west: Banshlai Bridge	Indian Railways : Sahibganj loop			Next station east: Chatra
Next station west: Banshlai Bridge	Stop no. 51	km from start 0	Platforms 3	Next station east: Chatra
