= Ram Ayodhya Prasad Yadav =

Nepali politician (1952/1953–2025)

- राम अयोध्या प्रसाद यादव

Member of the Constituent Assembly
- In office 21 January 2014 – 14 October 2017
- Preceded by: Saroj Kumar Yadav
- Succeeded by: Umakant Chaudhary (as Member of Parliament)
- Constituency: Bara 1

Personal details
- Born: 1952 or 1953
- Died: 2 July 2025 (aged 72)
- Party: Nepali Congress

Ram Ayodhya Prasad Yadav (Nepali: राम अयोध्या प्रसाद यादव; 1952 or 1953 – 2 July 2025) was a Nepali politician who was a member of 2nd Nepalese Constituent Assembly. He won Bara–1 seat in the CA assembly in 2013 from the Nepali Congress. He died from kidney disease on 2 July 2025, at the age of 72.
