= Mukunda Neupane =

Nepali trade unionist and politician

- मुकुन्द न्यौपाने

Member of Parliament, Pratinidhi Sabha
- In office 4 March 2018 – 18 September 2022
- Constituency: Party list (CPN (UML); CPN (Unified Socialist))
- In office 20 June 1991 – 15 January 1999
- Preceded by: Constituency created
- Succeeded by: Umakant Chaudhary
- Constituency: Bara 1

Personal details
- Born: 20 May 1950 (age 76)
- Party: CPN (Unified Socialist)
- Other political affiliations: CPN (UML) (1990-2021)

Mukunda Neupane (Nepali: मुकुन्द न्यौपाने) is a Nepalese trade unionist and politician. Neupane is the president of the General Federation of Nepalese Trade Unions.

== Personal life ==
Neupane was born on 20 May 1950.

== Political life ==
In 1971 he joined the militant peasants movement. In 1973 he took part in building an embryo of a trade union movement in Biratnagar. Mukunda became an underground politician activist, and stayed underground until 1990. In 1991, he was elected to parliament.

Neupane won the Bara-1 seat in the 1994 legislative election with 17953 votes. In the 1999 legislative election he received 20,646 votes, but was defeated by the Nepali Congress candidate Uma Kanta Chaudhary.

Neupane was a candidate of CPN(UML) in the proportional representation list for the Constituent Assembly election.

== Electoral history ==
=== 1999 legislative elections ===
| Party | Candidate | Votes |
|---|---|---|
| Nepali Congress | Uma Kanta Chaudhary | 23,601 |
| CPN (Unified Marxist–Leninist) | Mukunda Neupane | 20,646 |
| Nepal Sadbhawana Party | Parmananda Prasad Yadav | 4,890 |
| CPN (Marxist–Leninist) | Chabi Lal Uprety | 2,363 |
| Rastriya Prajatantra Party | Raj Narayan Sah Teli | 2,136 |
| Others | | 553 |
| Invalid Votes | | 1,340 |
| Result | Congress gain | |
Source: Election Commission

=== 1994 legislative elections ===
| Party | Candidate | Votes |
|---|---|---|
| CPN (Unified Marxist–Leninist) | Mukunda Neupane | 17,953 |
| Nepali Congress | Shobhakar Parajuli | 15,552 |
| Nepal Sadbhawana Party | Parmanand Prasad Yadav | 5,546 |
| Rastriya Prajatantra Party | Nurual Hoda Ansari | 4,954 |
| Others | | 2,394 |
| Result | CPN (UML) hold | |
Source: Election Commission

=== 1991 legislative elections ===
| Party | Candidate | Votes |
|---|---|---|
| CPN (Unified Marxist–Leninist) | Mukunda Neupane | 16,990 |
| Nepali Congress | Janardan Phujadar | 14,747 |
| Result | CPN (UML) gain | |
Source: Election Commission
