= CMJ University =

Private university in Jorabat, Meghalaya, India

Coordinates: 25.5711°N 91.8954°E

- Type: Private
- Established: 22 July 2009
- Affiliations: UGC
- Chancellor: Dr. C. M. Jha
- Vice-Chancellor: Dr. Manjeet Kaur Kaushal
- Location: Jorabat, Meghalaya, India
- Campus: Urban
- Website: cmjuniversity.ac

CMJ University or CMJU is a private university located in Jorabat, Meghalaya, India.

== History ==
CMJ University was established in the year 2009 by an Act of Meghalaya State Legislature under the CMJ University Act, 2009 (Act No.4 of 2009) vide Notification No. LL(B)42/09/80 dated 20 July 2009.

The CMJ University is duly notified by UGC (Ministry of HRD, Government of India) as state private University under section 2(f) and empowered to award degrees as specified by the UGC under section 22 of UGC Act 1956, as per Notification P.NO. 8-21/2010(CPP-1/PU) dated 25 November 2010.

CMJ University has informed the state Government that consequent upon the cancellation of the order dated 31 March 2014 of the Government of Meghalaya vide judgement and order dated 16 July 2015, CMJ University has started functioning at their permanent campus at Jorabat, Ri-Bhoi District, Meghalaya.

== Controversy ==
UGC received complaints about the courses run by CMJ University outside its territorial jurisdiction and also in the off-campuses/study centres established by the university without the approval of UGC and State Government of Meghalaya. UGC constituted an expert Expert committee which visited CMJ University on 1 August 2013 with the nominees from AICTE and NCTE. The expert committee report was considered by the UGC commission at its meeting held on 1 October 2013 and a copy of the report was forwarded to the Governor Secretariat, Meghalaya and Chief Secretary, Meghalaya Government with the request to take appropriate action against CMJ University as per the provisions of the CMJ University act or any other law as the Governor Secretariat/State Government deems fit.

As per the recommendations by the Governor of Meghalaya and UGC, The Government of Meghalaya sent two show cause notices bearing No.EDN.110/2013/33 dated 12 November 2013 and No.EDN.CC/18/2013/69 dated 24 January 2014 for the dissolution of CMJ University Under section 48 (2) and (3) of CMJ University Act on the grounds of mismanagement, maladministration, indiscipline and failure in the accomplishment of the objectives of the University but as per the order dated 16 July 2015 in a Writ Petition filed by CMJ Foundation, the High court of Meghalaya quashed both the show cause notices and set aside the dissolution of CMJ University.

An investigation by the Enforcement Directorate in December 2024 revealed that CMJ university rewarded approximately 20,570 fake degrees. Digital evidence was found revealing that fake degrees were sold until the year of the dissolution order, 2013.

On 13 February 2025, the Supreme Court upheld Meghalaya state's order to dissolve the university.

== Faculties ==
- Faculty of Engineering & Technology
- Faculty of Arts and Crafts
- Faculty of Commerce
- Faculty of Science
- Faculty of Management
- Faculty of Law
- Faculty of Nursing
- Faculty of Pharmacy
- Faculty of Design and Architecture
- Faculty of Applied Science

== Allegations ==
His Excellency the Governor of Meghalaya in his capacity as visitor initiated certain actions against CMJ University for irregularities committed by it. His Excellency also recommended to the State Government of Meghalaya for dissolution of this University in terms of Section 48 of the CMJ University Act, 2009

— UGC notification

== Notable alumni ==
- Abdur Rahaman Liton, politician
- Ganesh Dhimal, Nepalese Politician
