= Rajgram, West Bengal =

Town in West Bengal, Birbhum

Rajgram Rajgram bazar
- Village
- Location in West Bengal, India Rajgram (India)
- Coordinates: 24.542789°N 87.849471°E
- Country: INDIA
- State: West Bengal
- District: Birbhum

Government
  - Type: Panchyat
  - Body: Rajgram nagar panchyat

Area
  - Total: 7 km^{2} (2.7 sq mi)

Population (2011)
  - Total: 8,378
  - Density: 1,200/km^{2} (3,100/sq mi)

Languages
  - Official: Bengali, Vojpuri
- Time zone: UTC+5:30 (IST)
- PIN: 731222 (Rajgram)
- Telephone code: 03465
- Lok Sabha constituency: Birbhum
- Vidhan Sabha constituency: Murarai
- Website: birbhum.nic.in

Rajgram is a village and Nagar panchayat in Murarai I CD block in Rampurhat subdivision of Birbhum district in the Indian state of West Bengal.

== Geography ==
Cities and towns in Rampurhat subdivision of Birbhum district
M: municipal city/ town, CT: census town, R: rural/ urban centre.
Owing to space constraints in the small map, the actual locations in a larger map may vary slightly

=== Location ===
Murarai, the CD block headquarters, is 9 km away from Rajgram. Suri, the district headquarters, is 103 km away.

=== Gram panchayat ===
Villages in Rajgram gram panchayat are: Ambhua, Banarampur, Barua Gopalpur, Bhadrakali, Rajgram and Santoshpur.

=== Overview ===
The northern portion of Rampurhat subdivision (shown in the map alongside) is part of the Nalhati Plains, a sub-micro physiographic region, and the southern portion is part of the Brahmani-Mayurakshi Basin, another sub-micro physiographic region occupying the area between the Brahmani in the north and the Mayurakshi in the south. There is an occasional intrusion of Rajmahal Hills, from adjoining Santhal Parganas, towards the north-western part of the subdivision. On the western side is Santhal Parganas and the border between West Bengal and Jharkhand can be seen in the map. Murshidabad district is on the eastern side. A small portion of the Padma River and the border with Bangladesh (thick line) can be seen in the north-eastern corner of the map.96.62% of the population of Rampurhat subdivision live the rural areas and 3.38% of the population live in the urban areas.

Note: The map alongside presents some of the notable locations in the area. All places marked in the map are linked in the larger full screen map.

== Demographics ==
As per the 2011 Census of India, Rajgram had a total population of 8,378 of which 4,284 (51%) were males and 4,094 (49%) were females. Population below 6 years was 1,596. The total number of literates in Rajgram was 3,238 (47.74% of the population over 6 years).

== Transport ==
State Highway 7, running from Rajgram to Midnapore, originates from Rajgram. A road links Rajgram to Kanupur on National Highway 12.

Rajgram railway station is on the Sahibganj loop. It is the last station in West Bengal.

== Healthcare ==
Rajgram has a primary health centre with 20 beds.
