= Shamsuddin Ahammad =

West Bengal politician

Member of West Bengal Legislative Assembly
- In office 1962–1967
- Preceded by: Constituency established
- Succeeded by: Bazle Ahmed
- Constituency: Murarai

Personal details
- Born: Birbhum district, Bengal Presidency
- Party: Revolutionary Socialist Party

Shamsuddin Ahammad was an Indian politician belonging to the Revolutionary Socialist Party (India). He served as a member of the West Bengal Legislative Assembly.

== Early life and family ==
Ahammad was born into a Bengali Muslim family in Birbhum district, Bengal Presidency.

== Career ==
Hannan contested in the 1962 West Bengal Legislative Assembly election where he ran as an Revolutionary Socialist Party candidate for Murarai Assembly constituency, winning against Congress politician Mohammad Yeaqub Hossain.
