= Murarai Assembly constituency =

Constituency of the West Bengal Legislative Assembly, in India

Murarai
- Constituency No. 294 for the West Bengal Legislative Assembly
- Interactive Map Outlining Murarai Assembly Constituency

Constituency details
- Country: India
- Region: East India
- State: West Bengal
- District: Birbhum
- Lok Sabha constituency: Birbhum
- Established: 1951
- Total electors: 252,203 (2026)
- Reservation: None

Member of Legislative Assembly
- 18th West Bengal Legislative Assembly
- Incumbent Mosarraf Hossain
- Party: Democratic Trinamool Congress
- Elected year: 2026
- Preceded by: Abdur Rahaman Liton

Murarai Assembly constituency is an assembly constituency in Birbhum district in the Indian state of West Bengal.

== Overview ==
According to the Election Commission of India, 252,004 voters were eligible to vote in the West Bengal assembly elections in Murarai. This includes 129,432 Male, 122,571 Female, and 1 third gender.

As per orders of the Delimitation Commission, No. 294 Murarai Assembly constituency is composed of the following: Murarai I CD Block, and Amdole, Jajigram, Mitrapur, Nandigram, Paikar I and Paikar II gram panchayats of Murarai II CD Block.

Murarai Assembly constituency is part of No. 42 Birbhum (Lok Sabha constituency).

== Members of the Legislative Assembly ==
Year	Name	Party
1951	Jogendra Narayan Das	Kisan Mazdoor Praja Party
1957	Kazi Abu Muhammad	Indipendent
1962	Shamsuddin Ahammad	Revolutionary Socialist Party
1967	Bazle Ahmed	Socialist Unity Centre of India
1969	Bazle Ahmed	Socialist Unity Centre of India
1971	Bazle Ahmed	Socialist Unity Centre of India
1972	Dr. Motahar Hossain	Indian National Congress
1977	Dr. Motahar Hossain	Indian National Congress
1982	Dr. Motahar Hossain	Indian National Congress
1987	Dr. Motahar Hossain	Indian National Congress
1991	Dr. Motahar Hossain	Indian National Congress
1996	Dr. Motahar Hossain	Indian National Congress
2001	Dr. Mohammed Qamre Elahi	Communist Party of India
2006	Dr. Mohammed Qamre Elahi	Communist Party of India
2011	Noor Alam Chowdhury	Trinamool Congress
2016	Abdur Rahaman Liton	Trinamool Congress
2021	Mosarraf Hossain	Trinamool Congress
2026	Mosarraf Hossain	Trinamool Congress

== Election results ==
=== 2026 ===
2026 West Bengal Legislative Assembly election: Murarai
Party	Candidate	Votes	%	±%
AITC	Mosarraf Hossain	96,902	39.89	▼27.34
INC	Sanjibur Rahaman	59,197	24.37	▲16.44
BJP	Rinki Ghosh	58,664	24.15	▲2.01
CPI(M)	Md. Ali Reza Mandal	13,137	5.41	
AIMIM	Tasir Sekh	6,326	2.6	
Indian Secular Front	Hazrat Ali	3,477	1.43	
NOTA	None of the above	1,166	0.48	▼0.21
Majority		37,705	15.52	▼29.57
Turnout		242,939	96.33	▲13.53
AITC hold		Swing	N/A	

=== 2021 ===
2021 West Bengal Legislative Assembly election: Murarai
Party	Candidate	Votes	%	±%
AITC	Mosarraf Hossain	146,496	67.23	▲9.72
BJP	Debasish Roy	48,250	22.14	▲19.46
INC	Asif Ekbal	17,287	7.93	▼39.44
NOTA	None of the above	1,509	0.69	▼0.16
Majority		98,246	45.09	▲44.95
Turnout		217,917	82.8	▼2.32
AITC hold		Swing	N/A	

=== 2016 ===
2016 West Bengal Legislative Assembly election: Murarai
Party	Candidate	Votes	%	±%
AITC	Abdur Rahaman (Liton)	94,661	47.51	▼0.24
INC	Ali Mortuza Khan	94,381	47.37	New
BJP	Hayatunninsh Bibi	5,353	2.68	▼0.36
BSP	Belal Sekh	1,376	0.69	▼1.20
SUCI	Mangal Hemram	917	0.46	New
RLD	Samshul Miya	866	0.43	New
NOTA	None of the Above	1,689	0.85	New
Majority		280	0.14	▼0.24
Turnout		199235	85.12	▼0.96
Registered electors		234,078		▲19.12
AITC hold		Swing	N/A	

=== 2011 ===
West Bengal assembly elections, 2011: Murarai
Party	Candidate	Votes	%	±%
AITC	Nure Alam Chowdhury	77,817	47.75	▲44.43
CPI(M)	Dr. Qamre Elahi	73,414	45.05	▼2.65
BJP	Sudhiranjan Das Goswami	4,961	3.04	New
BSP	Shiblal Sardar	3,074	1.89	▼0.03
Independent	Md. Ejrail	2,471	1.52	New
JP	Mir Mukid Hazi Rekib	1,228	0.75	New
Majority		4,403	2.70	▲0.05
Turnout		162,965	86.08	▼1.30
Registered electors		189,320		▲21.59
AITC gain from CPI(M)		Swing	N/A	

=== 2006 ===
2006 West Bengal Legislative Assembly election: Murarai
Party	Candidate	Votes	%	±%
CPI(M)	Dr. Qamre Elahi	61876	47.70	▲1.07
INC	Dr. Motahar Hossain	57657	44.45	New
AITC	Golam Mujtoba (pintu)	4314	3.32	▼41.54
Independent	Mangal Hemram	3375	2.60	New
BSP	Adhir Rabidas	2494	1.92	New
Majority		4219	3.25	▲1.07
Turnout		129716	87.38	▲7.72
Registered electors		148,450		▲5.37
CPI(M) hold		Swing	N/A	

=== 2001 ===
2001 West Bengal Legislative Assembly election: Murarai
Party	Candidate	Votes	%	±%
CPI(M)	Dr. Qamre Elahi	52186	46.63	▲1.87
AITC	Dr. Motahar Hossain	50205	44.86	New
BJP	Nanda Kishore Mondal	4180	3.74	▲0.03
Independent	Rafiqual Hossain	2734	2.44	New
PDS	Durgadas Ghosh	2605	2.33	New
Majority		1981	1.77	▲1.87
Turnout		111910	79.66	▼6.75
Registered electors		140,475		▲3.42
CPI(M) gain from INC		Swing	N/A	

=== 1996 ===
1996 West Bengal Legislative Assembly election: Murarai

Dr. Motahar Hossain of INC defeated Moyazzem Hossain of CPI(M).

=== 1991 ===
1991 West Bengal Legislative Assembly election: Murarai

Dr. Motahar Hossain of INC defeated Durgadas Ghosh of CPI(M).

=== 1987 ===
1987 West Bengal Legislative Assembly election: Murarai

Dr. Motahar Hossain of INC defeated Durgadas Ghosh of CPI(M).

=== 1982 ===
1982 West Bengal Legislative Assembly election: Murarai

Dr. Motahar Hossain of INC defeated Matiur Rahman of CPI(M).

=== 1977 ===
1977 West Bengal Legislative Assembly election: Murarai

Dr. Motahar Hossain of INC defeated Bazle Ahmed of CPI(M).

=== 1972 ===
1972 West Bengal Legislative Assembly election: Murarai

Dr. Motahar Hossain of INC defeated Bazle Ahmed of SUCI .

=== 1971 ===
1971 West Bengal Legislative Assembly election: Murarai

Bazle Ahmed of SUCI defeated Md. Mansural Hague of INC.

=== 1969 ===
1969 West Bengal Legislative Assembly election: Murarai

Bazle Ahmed of SUCI defeated Dr. Motahar Hossain of INC .

=== 1967 ===
1967 West Bengal Legislative Assembly election: Murarai

Bazle Ahmad of Independent defeated Dr. Motahar Hossain of INC.

=== 1962 ===
1962 West Bengal Legislative Assembly election: Murarai

Shamsuddin Ahammad of RSP defeated Md. Yeaqub Hossain of INC.

=== 1957 ===
1957 West Bengal Legislative Assembly election: Murarai

Kazi Abu Muhammad

=== 1951 ===
1951 West Bengal Legislative Assembly election: Murarai

In independent India's first election Jogendra Narayan Das of KMPP defeated Muddasar Hossain of INC.
