= Rampurhat–Malda Town section =

Overview
- Status: Operational
- Owner: Indian Railways
- Locale: West Bengal & Jharkhand
- Termini: Rampurhat Junction (south); Malda Town (north)
- Stations: 19 (excluding termini)

Service
- System: Indian Railways
- Operator(s): Eastern Railway

History
- Opened: 1866

Technical
- Line length: 123km (76 mi)
- Number of tracks: Rampurhat–Murarai (0–30km): 3 track; Murarai–Malda Town (31–123km): 2 track
- Track gauge: Indian gauge
- Electrification: Fully electrified (2016)
- Operating speed: 110kmph (max)

The Rampurhat–Malda Town section is a railway line connecting Rampurhat and Malda Town. This 123 kilometres (76 mi) track is part of the Howrah–New Jalpaiguri line and Sahibganj loop. It is under the jurisdiction of Eastern Railway. A large number of express and superfast trains, along with a high volume of freight traffic, operate on this route every day.

== History ==
In the early 1960s, when Farakka Barrage was being constructed, a radical change was made in the railway system north of the Ganges. Indian Railways created a new broad-gauge rail link from Kolkata.

The 2,240 m (7,350 ft)-long Farakka Barrage carries a rail-cum-road bridge across the Ganges. The rail bridge was opened in 1971.The electrification of Rampurhat-Malda Town section was completed in 2016.

== Track ==
For the 30 kilometres (19 mi) Rampurhat–Murarai section, the final location survey for upgrading the existing triple line to a quadruple line has been sanctioned and finalized. The project is targeted for completion by the year 2028.

For the 41 kilometres (25 mi) Murarai–Gumani section, a feasibility study for converting the double line into a triple line has been completed and the project is under development. The target for completion is the year 2027–28.

== Speed limit ==
The maximum permissible speed of Rampurhat–Malda Town is 110 kilometres per hour (68 mph) and will be upgraded to 130 kilometres per hour (81 mph) under FY 2025-26. To upgrade from 110 kmph to 130 kmph from Rampurhat to Gumani, several track renewal works are under progress. Among them, 28% works have already been completed. 53% of works are under construction and physical progress of these works is 51% on average. Further, 19% works are yet to be started.

== Stations ==
Swadinpur, Nalhati, Chatra, Murarai, Banshlai Bridge, Rajgram, Nagarnabi, Pakur, Tilbhita, Kotalpukur, Gumani, Bonidanga, Bindubashini, Tildanga, New Farakka, Chamagram, Khaltipur, Jamirghata, Gour Malda.

== Branch routes ==
- Rampurhat–Dumka
- Nalhati–Azimganj
- Bonidanga–Barharwa
- New Farakka – Jangipur Road

== Trains ==
=== Premium trains ===
- 12041/42 Howrah–New Jalpaiguri Shatabdi Express
- 22301/02 Howrah–New Jalpaiguri Vande Bharat Express
- 12503/04 Agartala–SMVT Bengaluru Humsafar Express

=== Long-distance Superfast trains ===
- 13433/34 Malda Town–SMVT Bengaluru Amrit Bharat Express
- 22503/04 Dibrugarh–Kanniyakumari Vivek Express
- 22511/12 Lokmanya Tilak Terminus–Kamakhya Karmabhoomi Express
- 12507/08 Aronai Express

== Freight operation point ==
Station	Freight operational capacity
Rampurhat	has a marshalling yard for handling heavy freight trains, and re-formation of rakes.; Rampurhat Junction also has crew changing facility.; has a loco shed for stabling both diesel and electric locomotives.; has a coach stabling yard for parking coaches temporarily.; has goods train dealing points for freight operations.; has 3 Indian Oil Tanks for fueling goods trains.; has PSC Sleeper Factory to produce & supply Pre-stressed concrete sleepers across India.
Nalhati	used for local goods / siding / stone / ballast traffic.
Chatra	used for stone & rock loading / unloading.
Rajgram	used for public siding for stone, private stone company siding.; Rajgram has “Public Siding (RJPS)” and “Rajgaon Stone Company Siding (RSCS)” for stone transportation operations.
Pakur	used for stone / ballast loading, siding.; used in coal / mineral transport plans.; The railway line on the western side leads to a freight yard, which consists of BOXNHL and BOBYN freight rakes.

== See also ==
- Rampurhat Junction
- Malda Town station
- Sahibganj loop
