= Sheikh Manjurul Islam =

West Bengal politician

Member of West Bengal Legislative Assembly
- In office 1971–1972
- Preceded by: Bhakti Bhushan Mandal
- Succeeded by: Bhakti Bhushan Mandal
- Constituency: Dubrajpur

Personal details
- Born: Birbhum district, Bengal Presidency
- Party: Communist Party of India (Marxist)

Sheikh Manjurul Islam was an Indian politician belonging to the Communist Party of India (Marxist). He served as a member of the West Bengal Legislative Assembly.

== Early life and family ==
Manjurul Islam was born into a Bengali family of Muslim Sheikhs in the Birbhum district of the Bengal Presidency.

== Career ==
Islam contested in the 1971 West Bengal Legislative Assembly election where he ran as a Communist Party of India (Marxist) candidate for Dubrajpur Assembly constituency, winning against Congress politician Mohammad Idris.
