= Dubrajpur railway station =

Railway station in West Bengal, India

Dubrajpur railway station দুবরাজপুর রেলওয়ে স্টেশন
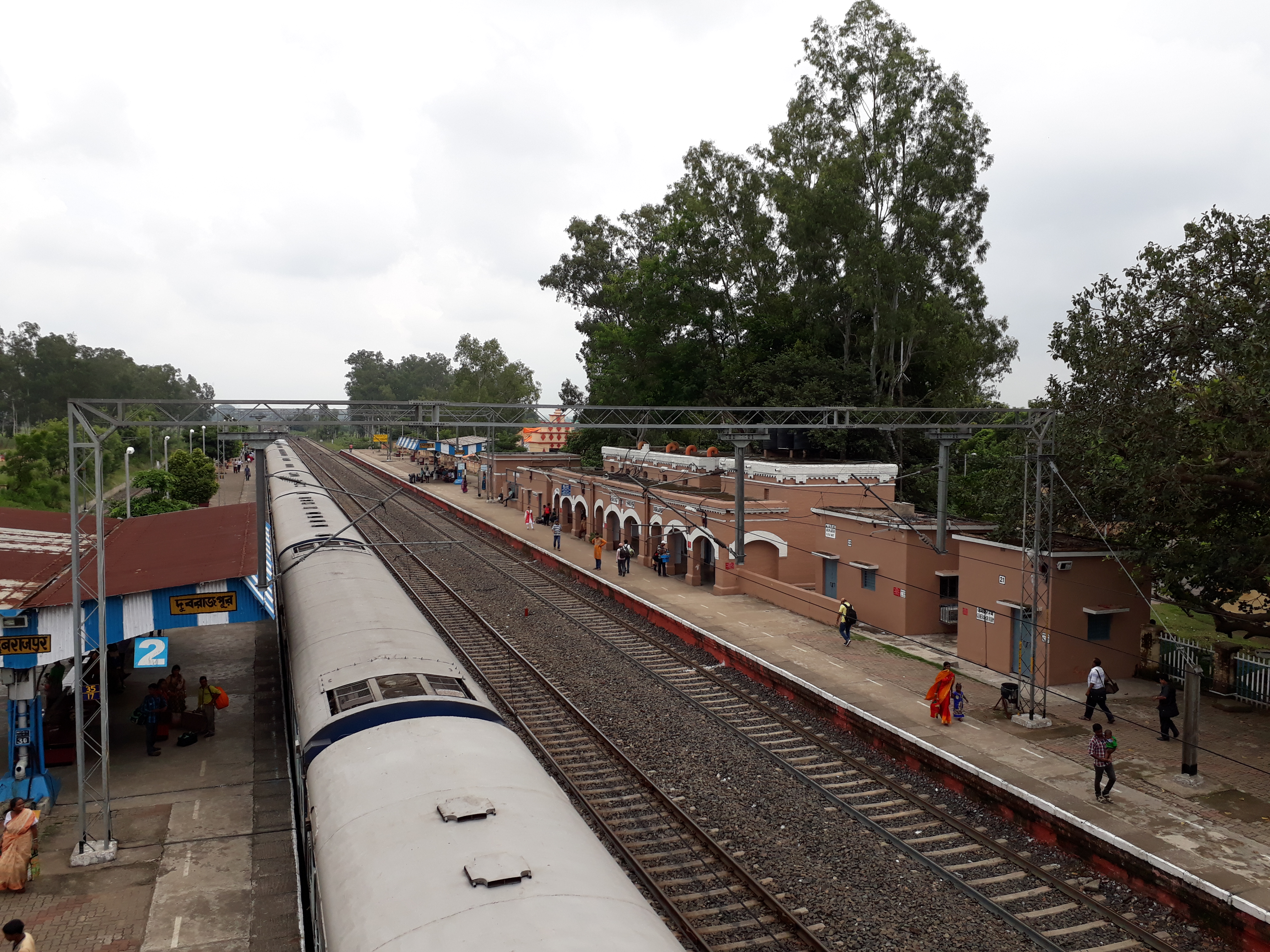

General information
- Location: State Highway 7, Dubrajpur, Birbhum district, West Bengal; India
- Coordinates: 23°28′52″N 87°13′28″E
- Elevation: 93 metres (305 ft)
- System: Indian Railways
- Owner: Indian Railways
- Operator: Eastern Railway
- Lines: Andal–Sainthia branch line Sahibganj loop
- Platforms: 2
- Tracks: 2

Construction
- Structure type: Standard (on ground station)

Other information
- Status: Functioning
- Station code: DUJ
- Division(s): Asansol

History
- Opened: 1913
- Electrified: 2012–16
- Former names: East Indian Railway Company

Services
Preceding station	Indian Railways	Following station
Panchra towards Andal Junction	Eastern Railway zone Andal–Sainthia branch line	Chinpai towards Sainthia Junction
Location

Dubrajpur railway station is a railway station of Andal–Sainthia branch line of the Asansol railway division connecting from Andal to Sainthia on the Sahibganj loop line. This is under the jurisdiction of Eastern Railway zone of Indian Railways. It is situated beside State Highway 7 at Dubrajpur, Birbhum district in the Indian state of West Bengal. A number of Express and Passenger trains stop at Dubrajpur railway station.

== History ==
The Andal–Sainthia branch line was built in 1913. Electrification of Andal–Pandabeshwar section was completed in 2010–11 and Pandabeshwar-Saithia route including Dubrajpur railway station, was completed in 2016.
