= Fairs in Birbhum =

Fairs in Birbhum refers to the many fairs that take place in Birbhum district in the Indian state of West Bengal.

== Backdrop ==
Birbhum is a large but primarily rural district dotted with small towns. Many of the small towns had markets that were held on specific days in the week, where agricultural produce and products of cottage industry found a wide range of customers, many of whom travelled long distances to attend the markets. The fairs (mela in Bengali) spread right across the district are thought of as an extension of the concept of markets, a place of not only trade and business but also a meeting place of people and an arena for cultural exchange.

The largest and most notable fair is the Poush Mela held at Santiniketan for three days from 7 Poush. The baul mela is held at Jaydev Kenduli on the occasion of Poush Sankranti or Makar Sankranti. It starts on the last day of the Bengali calendar month Poush and continues up to 2 Magh. On the occasion of Choitro Sankranti, a fair is organised on the last day of the Bengali calendar month of Choitro and continues for three days at Kankalitala. Lakhs of pilgrims assemble at Patharchapuri for the fair held on 10–12 Choitro commemorating the death anniversary of Data Saheb.

Apart from these major fairs, numerous other fairs are held across the district. A few of them are mentioned here.

== Traditional fairs ==
Medini mela is organised around the time of Muharram and Shab e Baraat near the mazar of Shah Abdullah Kermani at Khustigiri. The emphasis in these fairs is on catering to the needs of rural women. Urs fair is organised on 15 Falgun at Langulia village in Suri police station and on 23 Falgun at Rajnagar.

A fair is organised on Buddha Purnima day on the occasion of Dharmaraj Puja in Kaddang village. Dharmaraj puja fairs are held at several other places – in Banashanka village on Buddha Purnima day, in Kandapur village on Shravani Purnima day, and in Kurmitha village on the occasion of Asarhi Purnima. Lebrashwar celebrates Shiva Gajan with a three-day fair. Villages such as Parui, Katna, Rongaipur etc. celebrate Brahmadaitya Puja with fairs spread across several days in the early part of Magh. Khosnagar has a fair for Saraswati Puja.

Tarapith sports a festive look round the year, but a special fair is held on the occasion of Shukla chaturdashi in the month of Ashvin. Birchandrapur, about 8 kilometres (5.0 mi) from Tarapith and a centre of Vaishnava pilgrimage, organises fairs for Rath Yatra and Goshtaastami. The birth anniversary of Nityananda is celebrated with Aradhanar mela in the month of Magh. The area is also known as Ekachakra, the place where the Pandavas spent some time in anonymity.

Shivaratri mela is organised at Dabuk, which boasts of the tallest Shiva temple in Birbhum. Shibgram in Mayureswar police station organises a fair for Makar Sankranti. A Brahmadaitya Mela is organised on 1 Magh on the banks of Ramsagar at Dheka. A week-long fair is organised at Kaleswar on the occasion of Shivaratri in Falgun. The fair organised on the banks of the Mayurakshi River at Suganpur on the occasion of Buddha Purnima in Boisakh continues for three months. The Urs fair of Malang Zakaria Pir is held on 22–23 Poush at Tildanga. Lohajang Saheb Pirer Mela is held at Bara village near Lohapur on 2–20 Magh.

A fair is organised on the first three days of Poush in honour of Sasan Kali at Bumkotala, at the western end of Rampurhat. The fair comes alive with the singing and dancing of Santals. Choitro Sankranti fair is held in precincts of Dhamri Kali, on the banks of Brahmani River, in Nalhati police station. Traditionally large numbers of goats were offered to the goddess. Sri Gopaler Mela is held at Kaluha village on the occasion of Dol. Banbater Mela is held for seven days starting from a day after Saraswati Puja at Kurugram. A month-long fair at Rudranagar near Chatra, organised on the occasion of Basanti Puja, has on display the work of local craftsmen. A fair is organised on the occasion of Kali Puja for 10–15 days at Jajigram.

Chandidas Mela is organised on the banks of Denta Pukur in Nanoor. The week–long Radhamadhab Mela is organised from 14 Choitro at Charkalgram near Nonoor. A three–day fair is organised on the occasion of Saraswati Puja at Hetampur.

== Modern fairs ==
Magh Mela at Sriniketan is basically a fair displaying rural crafts. Sri Sri Ramakrishna Ashram organises Abhedananda Mela at Dubrajpur in December. Netaji Subhas Mela is held for 10 days from 1 Magh around Raksha Kali temple in the outskirts of Sainthia. The once famous Barabaganer Mela in Suri closed down long ago. Similarly, Vivekananda Mela and Sarada Mela also closed down.
