= Dubrajpur Assembly constituency =

West Bengal Legislative Assembly constituency

Dubrajpur
- Constituency No. 284 for the West Bengal Legislative Assembly
- Interactive Map Outlining Dubrajpur Assembly Constituency

Constituency details
- Country: India
- Region: East India
- State: West Bengal
- District: Birbhum
- Lok Sabha constituency: Birbhum
- Established: 1962
- Total electors: 181,978
- Reservation: SC

Member of Legislative Assembly
- 18th West Bengal Legislative Assembly
- Incumbent Anup Kumar Saha
- Party: BJP
- Alliance: NDA
- Elected year: 2026

Dubrajpur Assembly constituency is an assembly constituency in Birbhum district in the Indian state of West Bengal. It is reserved for scheduled castes.

== Overview ==
As per orders of the Delimitation Commission, No. 284, Dubrajpur Assembly constituency (SC) is composed of the following: Dubrajpur municipality, Balijuri, Hetampur, Jashpur, Laxmi Narayanpur, Loba and Paduma gram panchayats of Dubrajpur CD Block, and Khoyrasol CD Block.

Dubrajpur Assembly constituency is part of No. 42 Birbhum Lok Sabha constituency. It was earlier part of Bolpur Lok Sabha constituency.

== Members of the Legislative Assembly ==
Election	Name	Party
1962	Bhakti Bhusan Mandal	All India Forward Bloc
1967	K.N. Bandopadhyay	Independent
1969	Bhakti Bhusan Mandal	All India Forward Bloc
1971	Sheikh Manjural Islam	Communist Party of India
1972	Sachi Nandan Swami	Indian National Congress
1977	Bhakti Bhushan Mandal	All India Forward Bloc
1982	Bhakti Bhushan Mandal	All India Forward Bloc
1987	Bhakti Bhushan Mandal	All India Forward Bloc
1991	Bhakti Bhushan Mandal	All India Forward Bloc
1996	Bhakti Bhushan Mandal	All India Forward Bloc
2001	Bhakti Pada Ghosh	All India Forward Bloc
2006	Bhakti Pada Ghosh	All India Forward Bloc
2011	Bijoy Bagdi	All India Forward Bloc
2016	Chandra Naresh Bauri	Trinamool Congress
2021	Anup Kumar Saha	Bharatiya Janata Party
2026	Anup Kumar Saha	Bharatiya Janata Party

== Election results ==
=== 2026 ===
2026 West Bengal Legislative Assembly election: Dubrajpur
Party	Candidate	Votes	%	±%
BJP	Anup Kumar Saha	117,437	53.33	▲5.39
AITC	Naresh Chandra Bauri	89,790	40.78	▼5.27
AIFB	Bijoy Bagdi	5,028	2.28	▼0.66
INC	Byapari Sanjoy	2,911	1.32	
NOTA	None of the above	2,487	1.13	▼0.41
Majority		27,647	12.55	▲10.66
Turnout		220,193	94.99	▲10.35
BJP hold		Swing		

=== 2021 ===
West Bengal assembly elections, 2021: Dubrajpur
Party	Candidate	Votes	%	±%
BJP	Anup Kumar Saha	98,083	47.94	
AITC	Debabrata Saha	94,220	46.05	
AIFB	Bijoy Bagdi	6,014	2.94	
BMP	Sanjay Das	2,032	0.99	
NOTA	None of the above	3,157	1.54	
Majority		3,863	1.89	
Turnout		204,599	84.64	
BJP gain from AITC		Swing		

=== 2016 ===
2016 West Bengal Legislative Assembly election: Dubrajpur
Party	Candidate	Votes	%	±%
AITC	Chandra Naresh Bauri	94,309	51.72	▲5.18
AIFB	Bijoy Bagdi	54,415	29.84	▼18.43
BJP	Ramprasad Das	25,258	13.85	▲7.39
NOTA	None of the Above	3,658	2.01	
BMP	Khagen Das	2,906	1.59	
Independent	Biswanath Bauri	1,812	0.99	
Majority		39,894	21.88	
Turnout		182,358	84.28	
AITC gain from AIFB		Swing		

=== 2011 ===
2011 West Bengal Legislative Assembly election: Dubrajpur
Party	Candidate	Votes	%	±%
AIFB	Bijoy Bagdi	75,343	48.27	−13.34
AITC	Santoshi Saha	72,634	46.54	+22.95
BJP	Paltu Pada Dhibar	10,083	6.46	
Majority		2,709	1.73	
Turnout		156,064	85.76	
AIFB hold		Swing		

=== 1977-2006 ===
In the 2006 and 2001 state assembly elections Bhakti Pada Ghosh of All India Forward Bloc won the Dubrajpur assembly seat defeating his nearests Sailen Mahata and Sattick Roy, both of Trinamool Congress respectively. Contests in most years were multi cornered but only winners and runners are being mentioned. Bhakti Bhushan Mandal of Forward Bloc won the seat from 1977 to 1996, defeating Arun Kumar Chakraborty of Congress In 1996, Bishnu Charan Ghosh of Congress in 1991, Gourhari Chandra of Congress in 1987, Nitaipada Ghosh of Congress in 1987 and Enayet Karim Choudhury of Congress in 1977.

=== 1962-1972 ===
Sachi Nandan Swami of Congress won in 1972. Sheikh Manjurul Islam of CPI(M) won in 1971. Bhakti Bhushan Mandal of Forward Bloc won in 1969. K.N.Bandopadhyay, Independent, won in 1967. Bhakti Bhushan Mandal of Forward Bloc won in 1962. Prior to that the Dubrajpur seat was not there.
