= Chandra Naresh Bauri =

Indian politician

Chandra Naresh Bauri (born 9 March 1967) is an Indian politician from West Bengal. He is a former one time member of the West Bengal Legislative Assembly from Dubrajpur Assembly constituency, which is reserved for the Scheduled Caste community, in Birbhum district. He was elected in the 2016 West Bengal Legislative Assembly election representing the All India Trinamool Congress.

== Early life and education ==
Bauri is from Dubrajpur, Birbhum district, West Bengal. He is the son of late Tinu Bauri. He completed his MA in geography at Visva Bharati University in 1991. Earlier, he did his Bed. He worked as a teacher at the Bolpur Nichupaty Nirod Baroni High School, Bolpur, Birbhum.

== Career ==
Bauri was first elected as an MLA winning the 2016 West Bengal Legislative Assembly election representing the All India Trinamool Congress for Dubrajpur Assembly constituency. He polled 94,309 votes and defeated his nearest rival, Bijoy Bagdi of the All India Forward Bloc, by a margin of 39,894 votes.
