= Anup Kumar Saha (Dubrajpur MLA) =

Indian politician

Anup Kumar Saha (born 1987) is an Indian politician from West Bengal. He is a member of the West Bengal Legislative Assembly from the Dubrajpur Assembly constituency, which is reserved for Scheduled Caste community, in Birbhum district representing the Bharatiya Janata Party.

== Early life and education ==
Saha is from Dubrajpur, Birbhum district, West Bengal. He is the son of Sanat Kumar Saha. He completed his MA in history in 2010 at Rabindra Bharati University, Kolkata. He declared assets worth Rs.22 lakh in his affidavit to the Election Commission of India.

== Career ==
Saha won the Dubrajpur Assembly constituency for the Bharatiya Janata Party in the 2021 West Bengal Legislative Assembly election. In 2021, he polled 98,083 votes and defeated his nearest rival, Debabrata Saha of the All India Trinamool Congress, by a margin of 3,863 votes. He retainied the Dubrajpur seat for the BJP in the 2026 West Bengal Legislative Assembly election. In 2026, he polled 1,17,437 votes and defeated his nearest rival, Chandra Naresh Bauri of the Trinamool Congress, by a margin of 27,647 votes.
