= Bhuban Badyakar =

Indian singer known for viral song "Kacha Badam"

Bhuban Badyakar (born c. 1971) is an Indian singer and street vendor from Kuraljuri village in the Birbhum district of West Bengal, India. He rose to national and international prominence in 2022 after his self-composed song Kacha Badam (meaning "raw almonds") went viral on social media platforms.

== Early life and background ==
Badyakar lived in modest circumstances in Kuraljuri village, Lakshminarayanpur Panchayat, Birbhum district. Before gaining recognition, he sold peanuts on his bicycle across nearby villages, earning about ₹200–250 per day. To attract customers, he composed and performed a catchy jingle that later became known as "Kacha Badam".

== Breakthrough with "Kacha Badam" ==
In early 2022, a video showing Badyakar singing while cycling through villages was uploaded to YouTube and quickly spread across social media. The song, remixed by music producers, inspired dance trends and memes across India and beyond. It was praised for its simple rhythm and authenticity, which captured the spontaneity of folk street music.

== Recognition and developments ==
Following the viral success, Badyakar was felicitated by the West Bengal Police in February 2022 for his musical contribution and for representing the local culture of Birbhum. He later recorded a follow-up track titled Amar Notun Gari ("My New Car") after recovering from a minor car accident in 2022.

== Challenges and copyright issues ==
Badyakar's sudden fame led to disputes regarding the ownership and copyright of "Kacha Badam". Media outlets reported that he initially did not receive royalties for the use of his composition in remixes and performances. Legal and music industry experts later highlighted his case as an example of how unregistered folk creators may lose rights to viral content in the digital era.

== Impact and significance ==
Badyakar's rise from a rural street vendor to an Internet sensation is frequently cited as a modern example of how social media can elevate grassroots folk art to mainstream attention. His story has been covered widely by Indian and international outlets, inspiring discussions on digital fame, folk culture, and representation of marginalised artists.

== Personal life ==
Badyakar lives with his wife, two sons, and a daughter in Kuraljuri village. Despite fame, he continues to perform at local events and has expressed pride in his village roots and folk identity.

== See also ==
- Folk music of Bengal
- Viral video
