= Hinglo River =

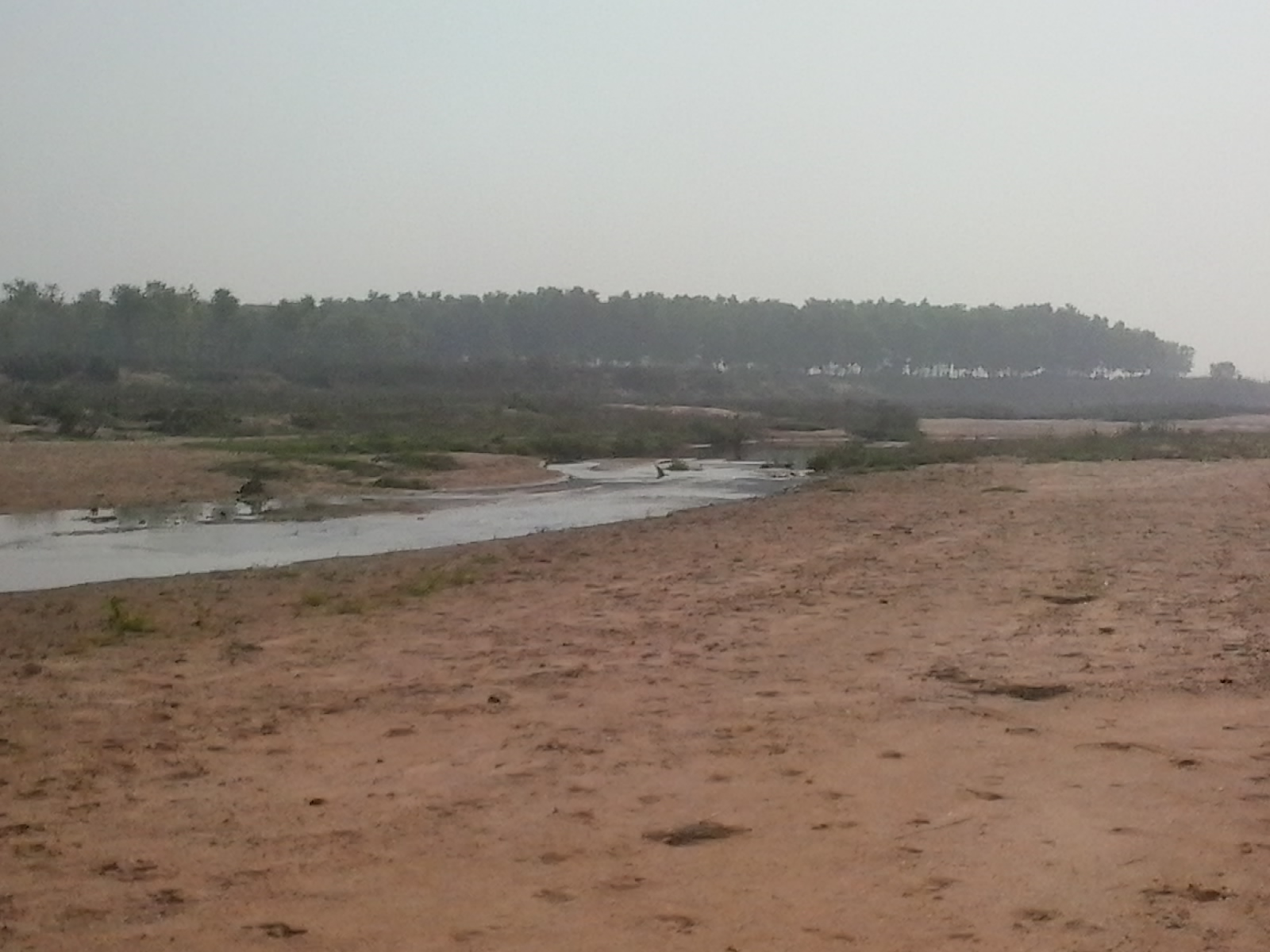

Location
- Country: India
- State: Jharkhand, West Bengal

Physical characteristics
- Source
  - location: Hill near Jamtara, Santhal Parganas
  - coordinates: 23°54′N 87°6′E
- Basin size: 2,009 km^{2} (776 sq mi)
- Discharge
  - location: Ajay River

The Hinglo River (also spelt Hinglow) is a tributary of the Ajay River in the Indian states of Jharkhand and West Bengal.

== Course ==
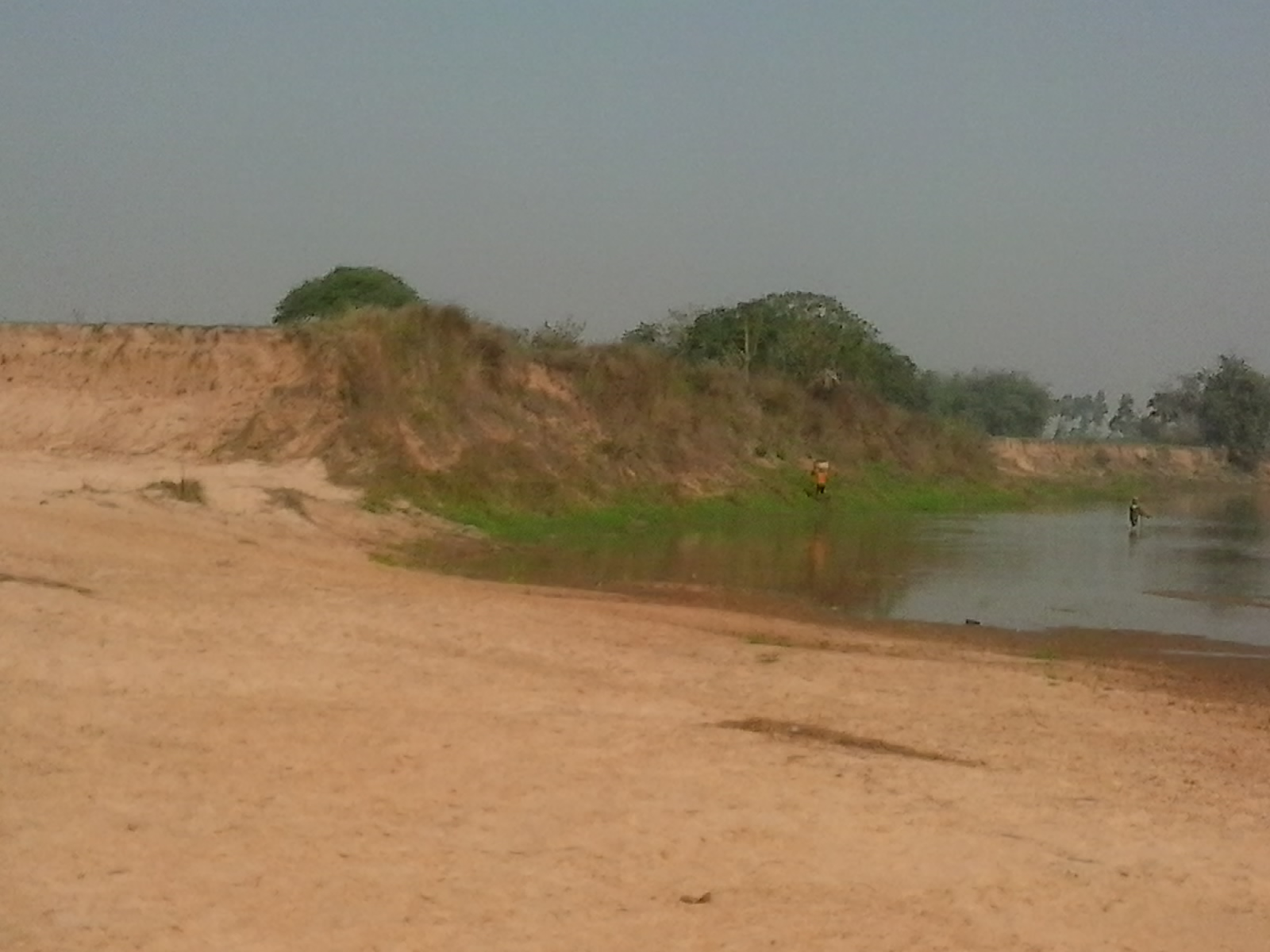
Hinglo River

The Hinglo has its source in Santhal Parganas, runs parallel to the Ajay for some distance and flows into it a little after Bhimgarh, actually near Palashdanga village, Birbhum district. It has a watershed area of 2,009 hectares (4,960 acres).

== Irrigation and floods ==
A dam across the Hinglo provides irrigation in the areas between the Ajay and the Kopai but environmentalists also blame the dam for floods.

Hinglo dam has a capacity of 17,102,000 cubic metres (13,865 acre⋅ft). However, as a result of improper management of water resources for canal irrigation, the bed of the river has risen and the canals have become derelict. Moreover, the dam is silted up. During the last phase of the monsoon season when excessive rainfall occurs the dam cannot take in all the water and so much of it is released. This surplus water becomes voluminous and overflows the bank of the river and canals. The side embankments are not constructed perfectly everywhere, and the weak points are breached to cause flood. Flood waters can not always find passage to be drained out quickly causing water logging.

== See also ==
- List of rivers of India
- Rivers of India
