= Bir king =

The Bir King was a famous king of Birbhum before Muslim rule. Asaduzzaman Khan was an army chief who killed the Bir King and conquered Rajnagar where he established a Muslim sultanate.

According to local history, in 1350 AD there were some quarrels between Laxmanawati and Subarnagram, and the ancestors of Bir King had set up a capital at Lakknur (Rajnagar). the Bir Kings were two brothers, Bir Singh and Mallar Singh. Mallarpur has named after Mallar Singh.

In 1206 AD an army officer of Muhammad bin Bakhtiyar Khalji, Muhammad Shiran Khalji defeated the Bir King and conquered Rajnagar. The queen committed suicide at a nearby pond.
