= Kondaipur =

- village
- Location in West Bengal Kondaipur (India)
- Coordinates: 23.8520°N 87.5948°E
- Country: India
- State: West Bengal
- District: Birbhum
- Time zone: UTC+5:30 (IST)
- Website: birbhum.gov.in

Kondaipur is a village in Birbhum district in the Indian state of West Bengal. It is located on the State Highway 6, on the way from Suri, West Bengal, to Ahmadpur, West Bengal, at a distance of approximately 9 kilometers (5.59 miles) from Suri. Purandarpur Village is the nearest village.

== Economy and demographics ==
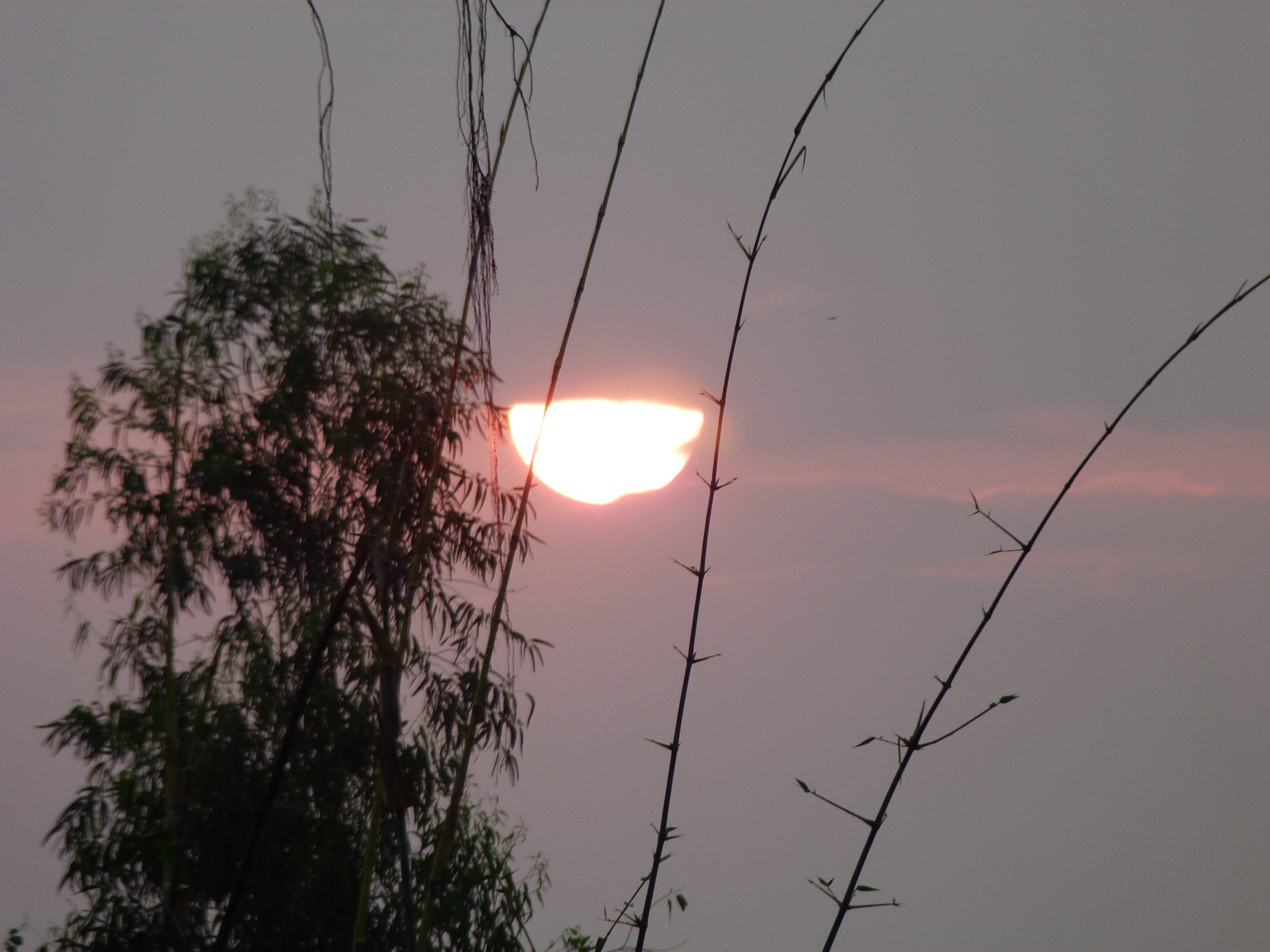
Sunset at Purandarpur, near Kondaipur village

The main means of livelihood is agriculture.

Santal tribes were the main inhabitants of this village. Later on, the Bagdi tribe started living here.
They have worked there as farmers ever since.

There is a natural water spring near this village which is the main source for agriculture. The current estimated population is 1500 approximately.

== Transport ==
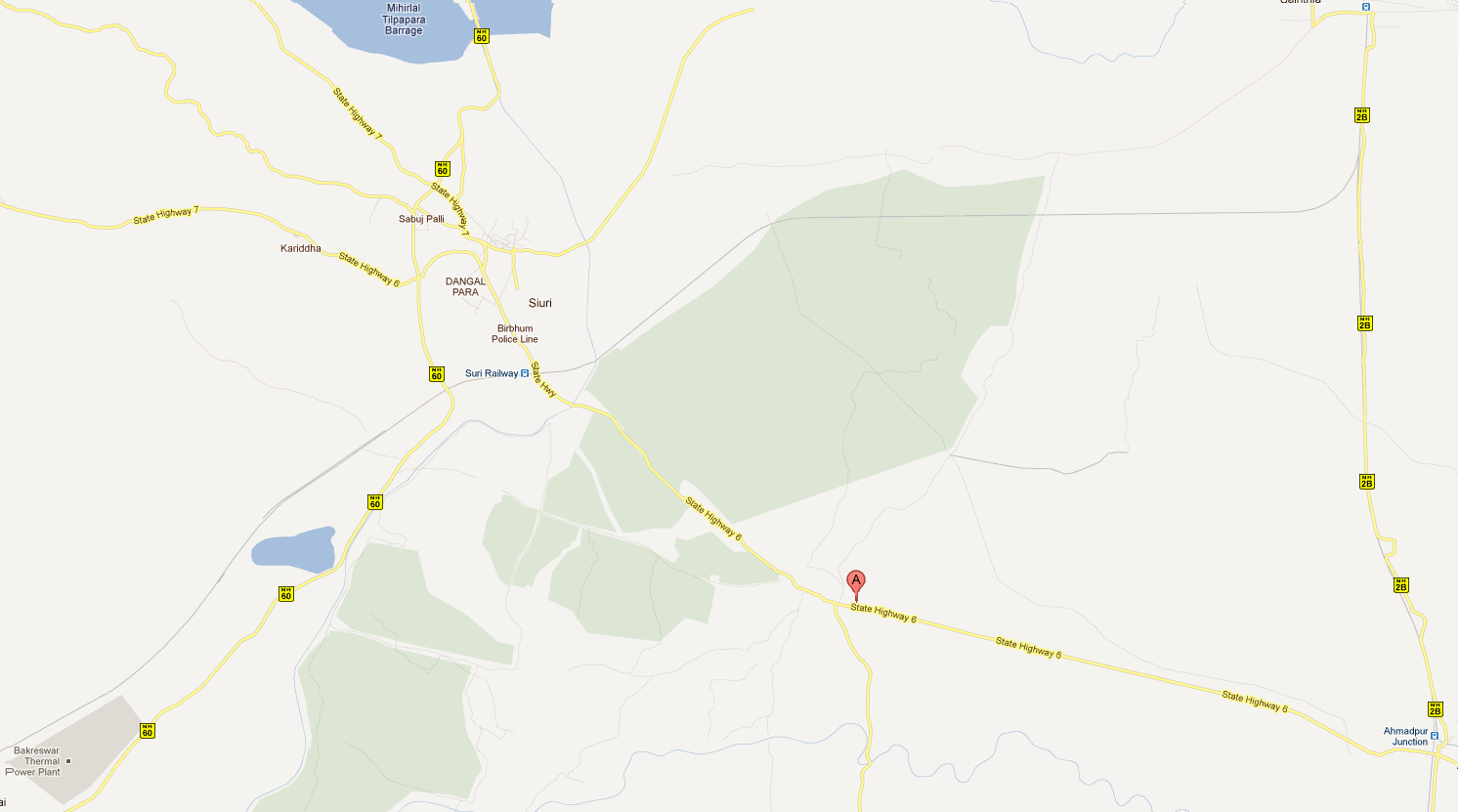
Map location of kondaipur denoted by the marker

Situated on the State Highway, it is well connected by road. One can reach Kondaipur from Kolkata by Durgapur Expressway and NH 2B. 210 km, 4 hours 30 mins

The nearest railway station is at Suri, which is the district headquarters of Birbhum. The nearest airport is located at Kolkata.

== Durga Puja ==
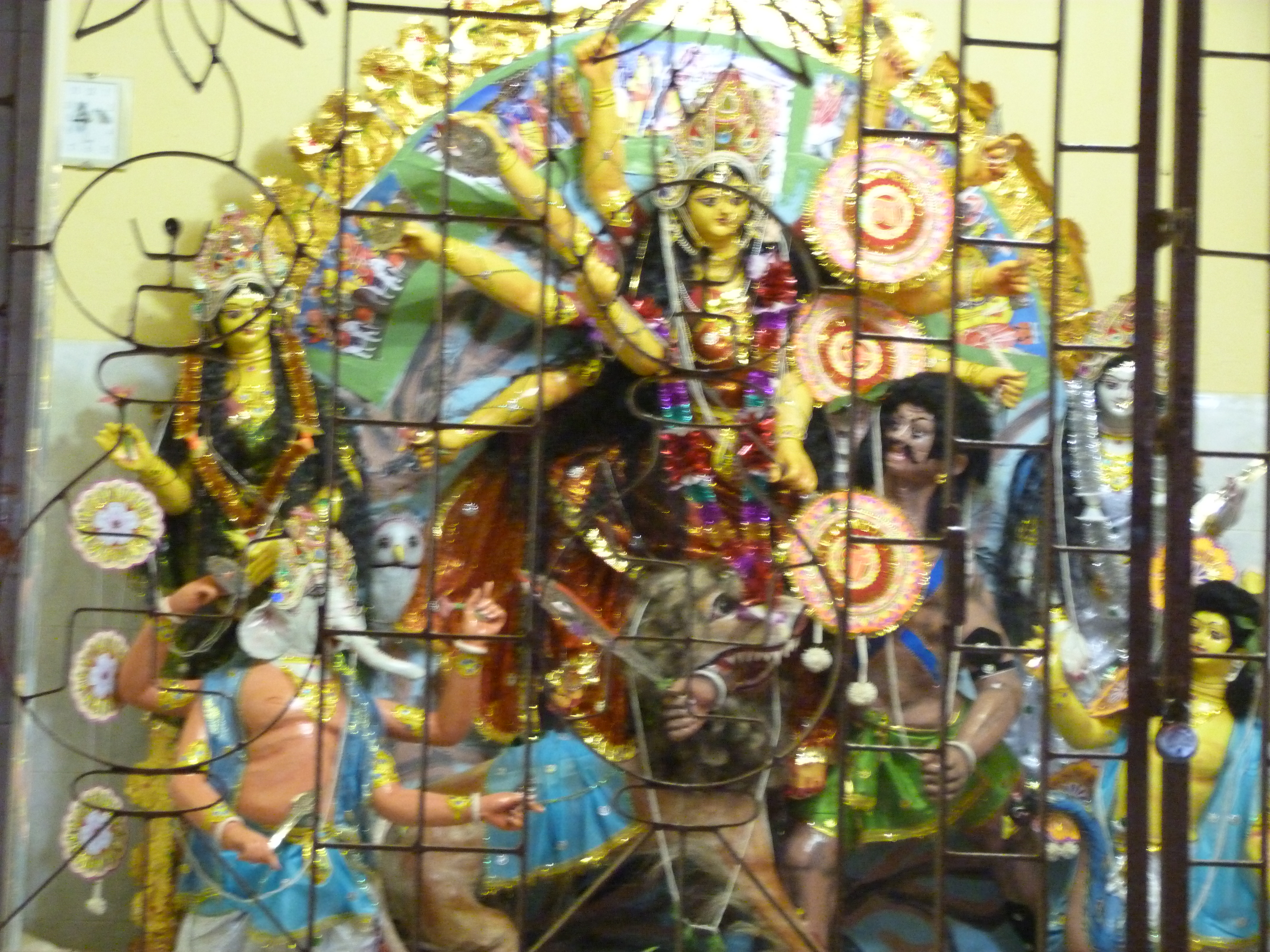
Durga Puja 2011, in Kondaipur

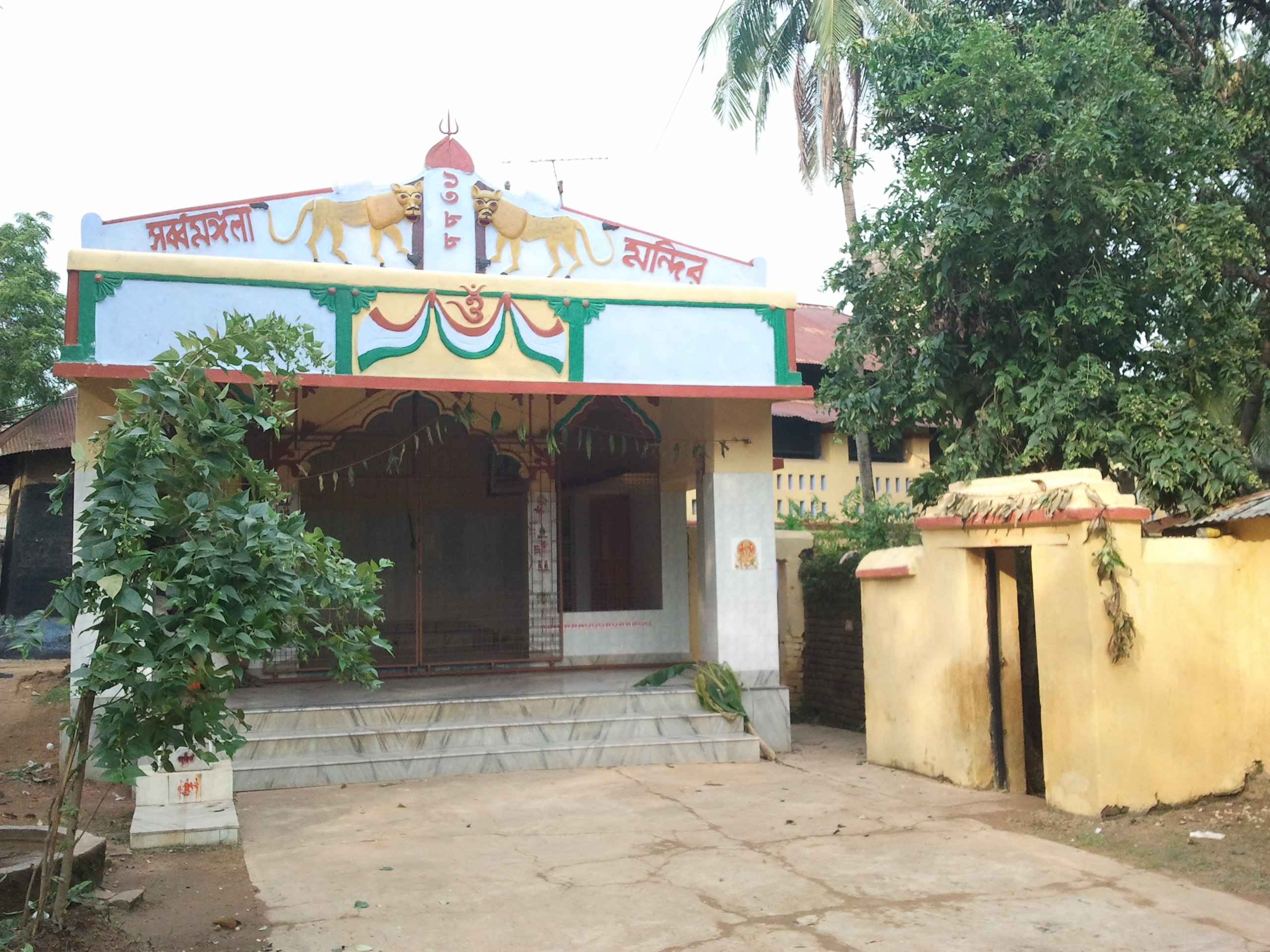
The Durga Temple at Kondaipur

Villagers are proud of their Durga Puja festival, which has been conducted for more than 300 years.

The Brahmin family of Ruplal Chattopadhyay started this Durga Puja ceremony. The then population of the village was 45 heads. Later on, Mohendralal Bandyopadhyay inherited this puja.

The Bandyopadhyay family has been performing this ritual for 8 generations now.
