= Poush Mela =

Annual fair and festival in Santiniketan, West Bengal, India

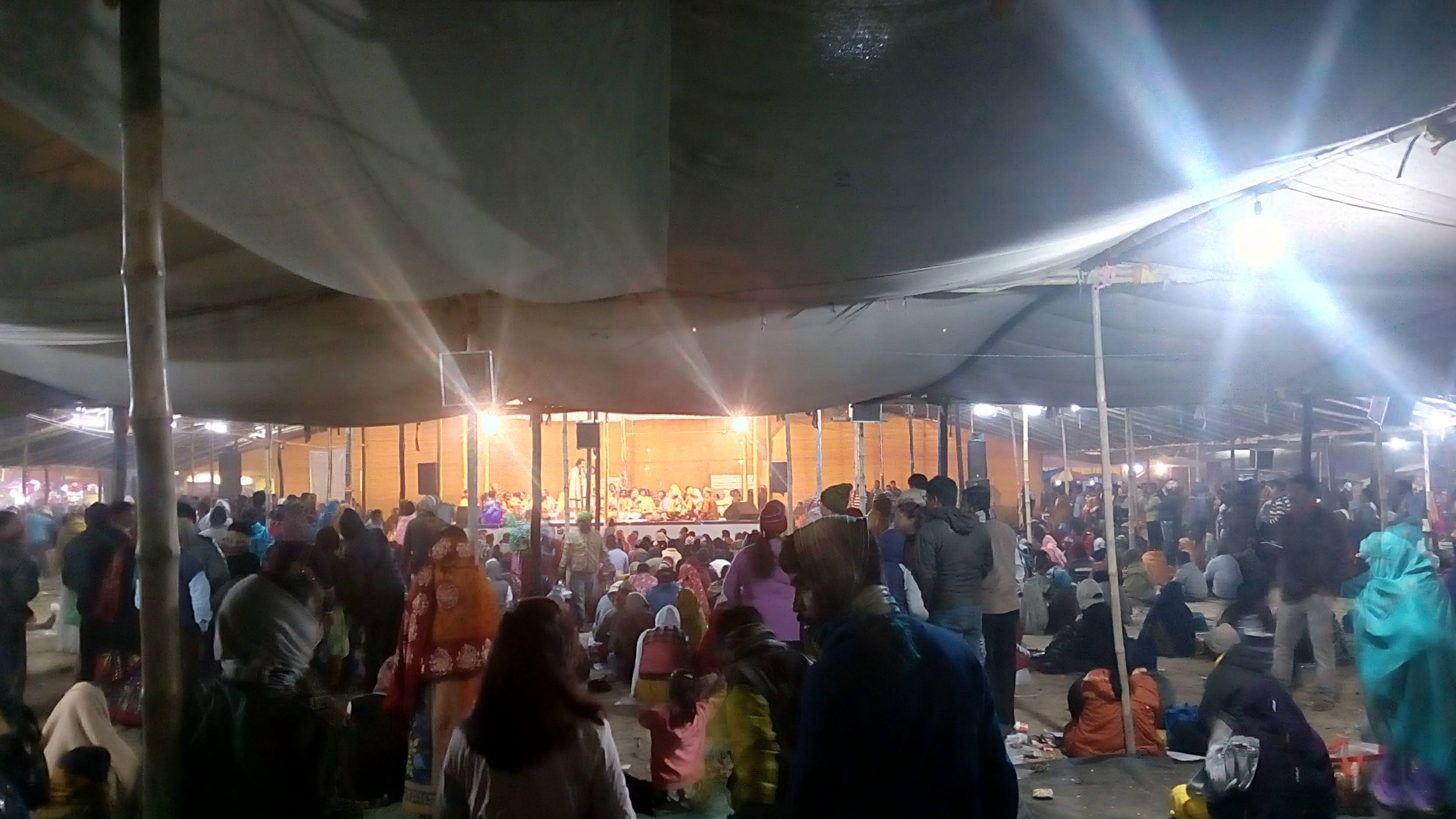
Baul song at Poush Mela, 2018

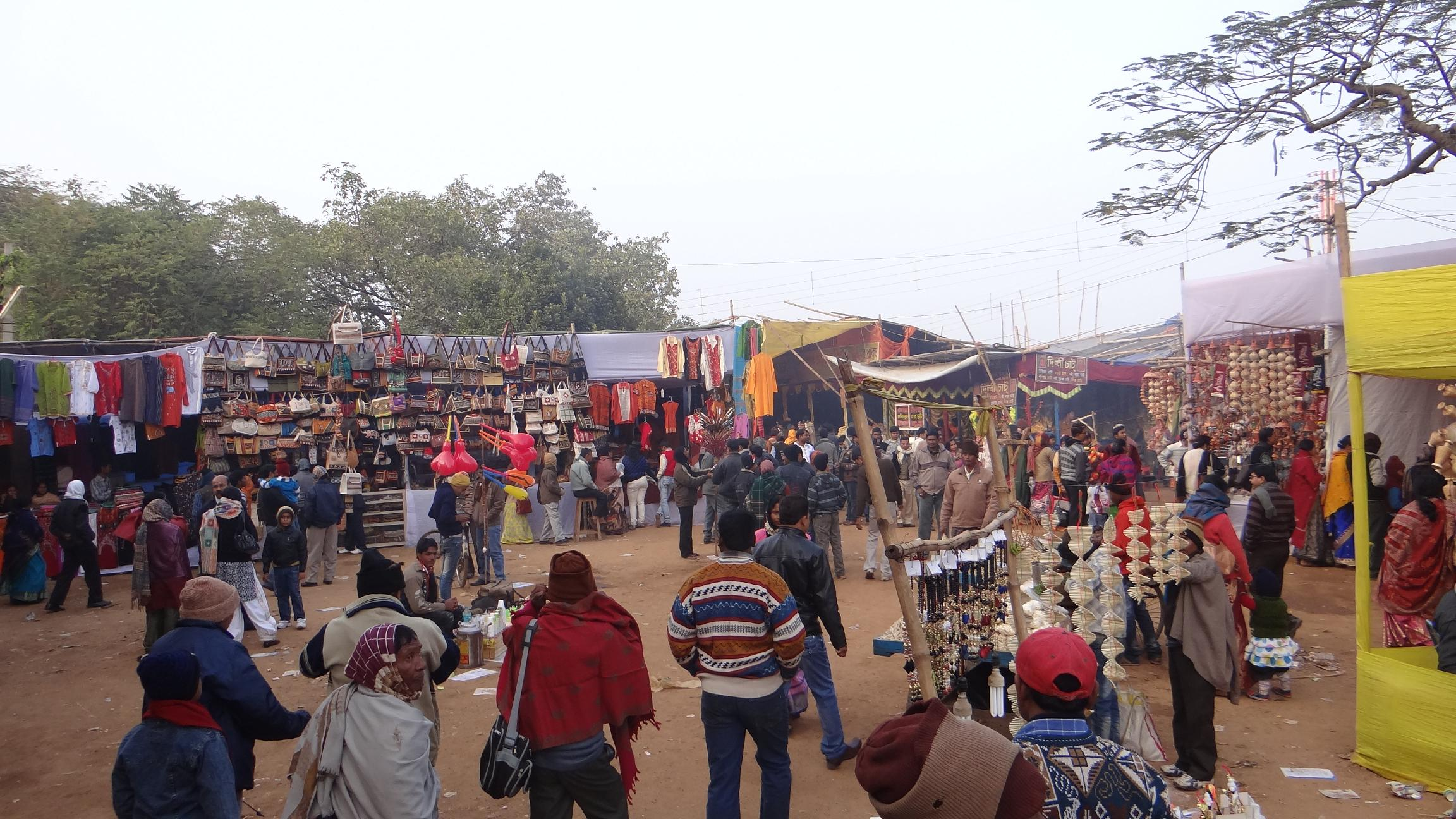
Poush Mela Bazaar, 2012

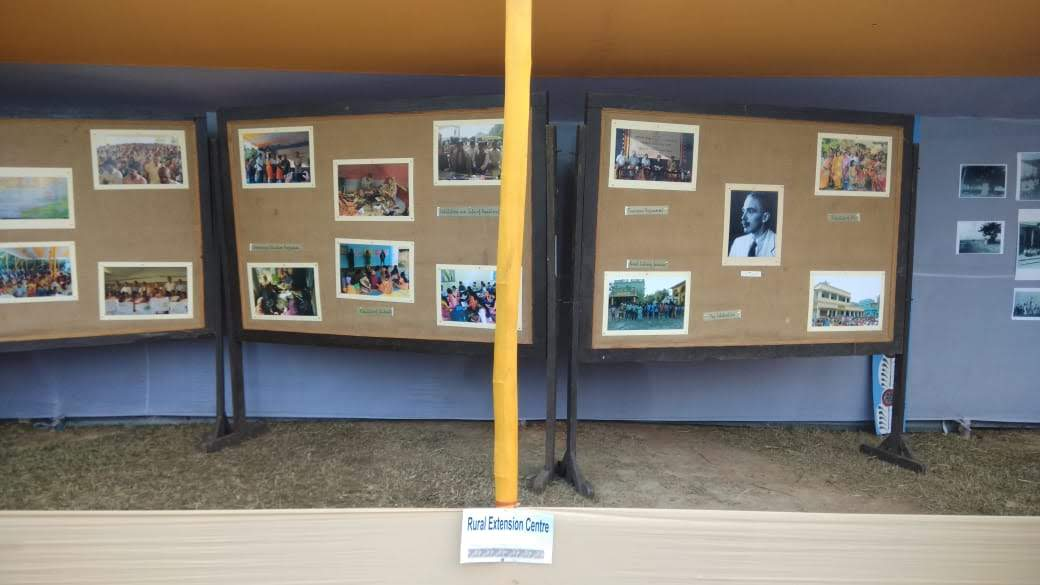
An exhibition at Poush Mela, 2018

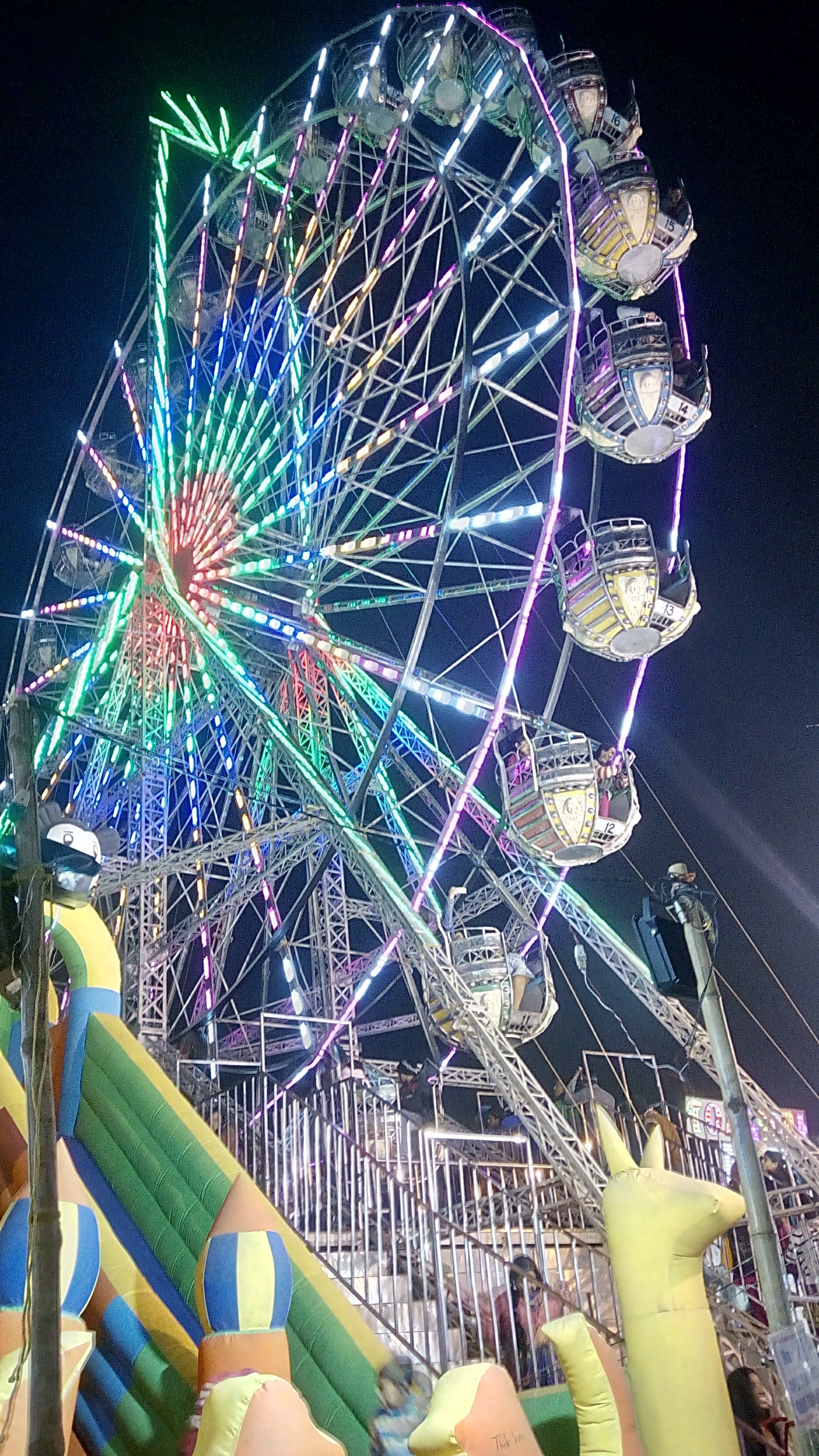
Ferris wheel at Poush Mela

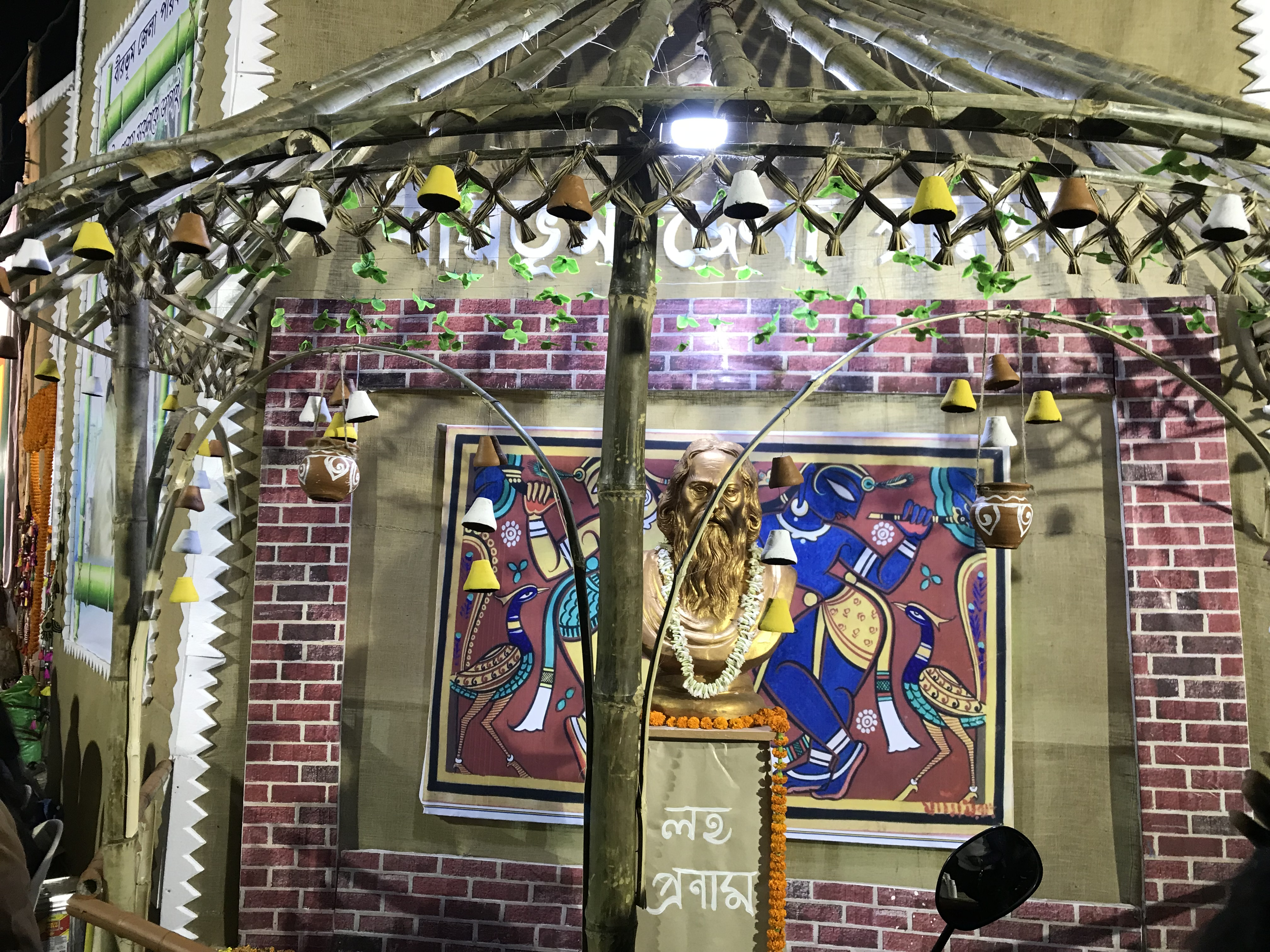
A stall display at Poush Mela-Santiniketan-West Bengal

Poush Mela (Bengali: পৌষ মেলা) is an annual fair and festival that takes place in Santiniketan, in Birbhum District in the Indian state of West Bengal, marking the harvest season. Commencing on the 7th day of the month of Poush, the fair officially lasts for three days, although vendors may stay until the month-end as per the university regulations. From 2017 onwards, the fair lasted for six days. The key characteristic of this fair include live performances of Bengali folk music, such as baul, kirtan and Kobigan.

== Background ==
Devendranath Tagore with twenty followers accepted the Brahmo creed from Ram Chandra Vidyabagish on 21 December 1843 (7 Poush 1250 according to the Bengali calendar). This was the basis of Poush Utsav (the Festival of Poush) at Santiniketan

A Brahma mandir was established at Santiniketan on 21 December 1891 (7 Poush 1298 according to the Bengali calendar). A small fair was organised in 1894 in connection with the establishment anniversary of the Brahma mandir, in the ground opposite the mandir. What started as a small homely Poush Mela now attracts attention of not only the people of Birbhum district but tourists from all around.

From 1894 onwards, the Poush Mela has been organized every year. However it has been put on halt for three times due to the Bengal Famine of 1943, Direct Action Day of 1946 and the COVID-19 pandemic.

In earlier days the mela (fair) was held in the ground on the north side of Brahma mandir (also referred to as glass temple). On that day, a firework display was held in earlier days after evening prayers. As the mela increased in size, it was shifted to the field in Purbapalli.

== Inauguration ==
Poush Utsav is inaugurated on 7 Poush (around 23 December). At dawn, Santiniketan wakes up to the soft music of shehnai. The first to enter the scenario is the Vaitalik group, who go round the ashrama (hermitage) singing songs. It is followed by a prayer-meeting at Chhatimtala. Then the entire congregation moves on to Uttarayan singing songs.

== Other days ==
Poush Mela is characterized by the live performances of Bengali folk music, especially the baul music. It includes folk songs, dances and tribal sports. Each day of this festival is filled with different activities. The last day of this fair is devoted to those who are related to Santiniketan.

== The fair ==
Some 1,500 stalls take part in the fair. The number of tourists pouring in for the three-day fair is around 10,000. Government statistics put the daily inflow of tourists in to Santiniketan at around 3,500 per day; but during major festival such as Pous Utsav, Basanta Utsav, Rabindra Paksha, and Naba Barsha it goes up to an average 40,000 per day or more. Obviously, many of them do stay back in Santiniketan, which has 85 lodges with accommodation for 1,650. Beside of this, room on rent can be hired for some days.

Local printed fabrics and handicrafts are available in the stalls erected during the fair. Besides materials of household interest, toys are also available here. Various food stalls are also found.

== See also ==
- Visva-Bharati University
- Jaydev Kenduli
- Fairs in Birbhum
