= Bhakti Bhushan Mandal =

Indian politician

Bhakti Bhushan Mandal (1920 – 30 August 2004) was an Indian politician belonging to the All India Forward Bloc. He represented the Dubrajpur seat in the West Bengal Legislative Assembly 1962–1967, 1969–1971 and 1977–2001.

Mandal held the post of Minister for Judicial and Legislative in the second United Front cabinet formed in West Bengal in 1969.

In the 1970s he took part in founding the Defense Committee, which sought to help Naxalites arrested in staged encounters.

Mandal served as Minister for Fisheries and Co-operatives in the first Left Front cabinet. He was a member of the All India Forward Bloc West Bengal State Committee. At the time he was known as a civil rights campaigner and well connected with the Ananda Marg movement. In 1978, he went on a 24-day tour of China and became the president of the India-China Friendship Association.

In the early 1980s he led a Mandal Action Commission, which called for recognition as Other Backward Castes for 177 communities in West Bengal (encompassing around 50 percent of the population of the state). Mandal met with exiled Naga leader Phizo in London and declared himself as intermediary between Phizo and the Delhi government.

Mandal was publicly reprimanded by the Left Front chairman Promode Dasgupta for failure to maintain fish production levels. After the 1982 West Bengal Legislative Assembly election Kiranmoy Nanda of the West Bengal Socialist Party was named as new Minister for Fisheries.

Mandal would again be named as Minister for Co-operatives. Due to ill health, he was absent for months from his office. At the time of the swearing in of the Buddhadev Bhattacharya government in November 2000, Mandal was hospitalized at SSKM Hospital in Calcutta for malaria Mandal was not nominated for re-election in the 2001 West Bengal Legislative Assembly election, for health reasons.
