= Birbhum district =

District in West Bengal, India

- District of West Bengal
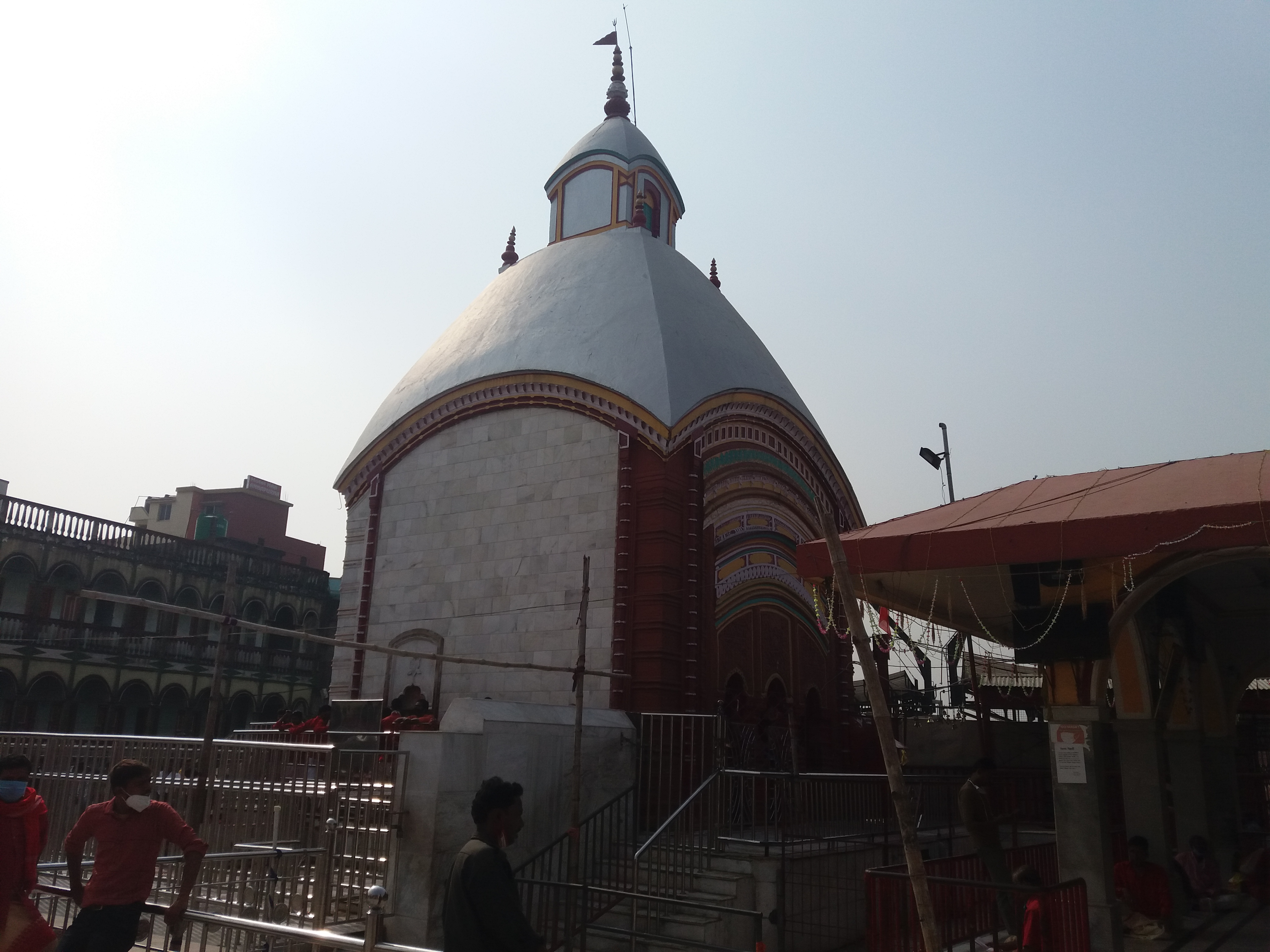
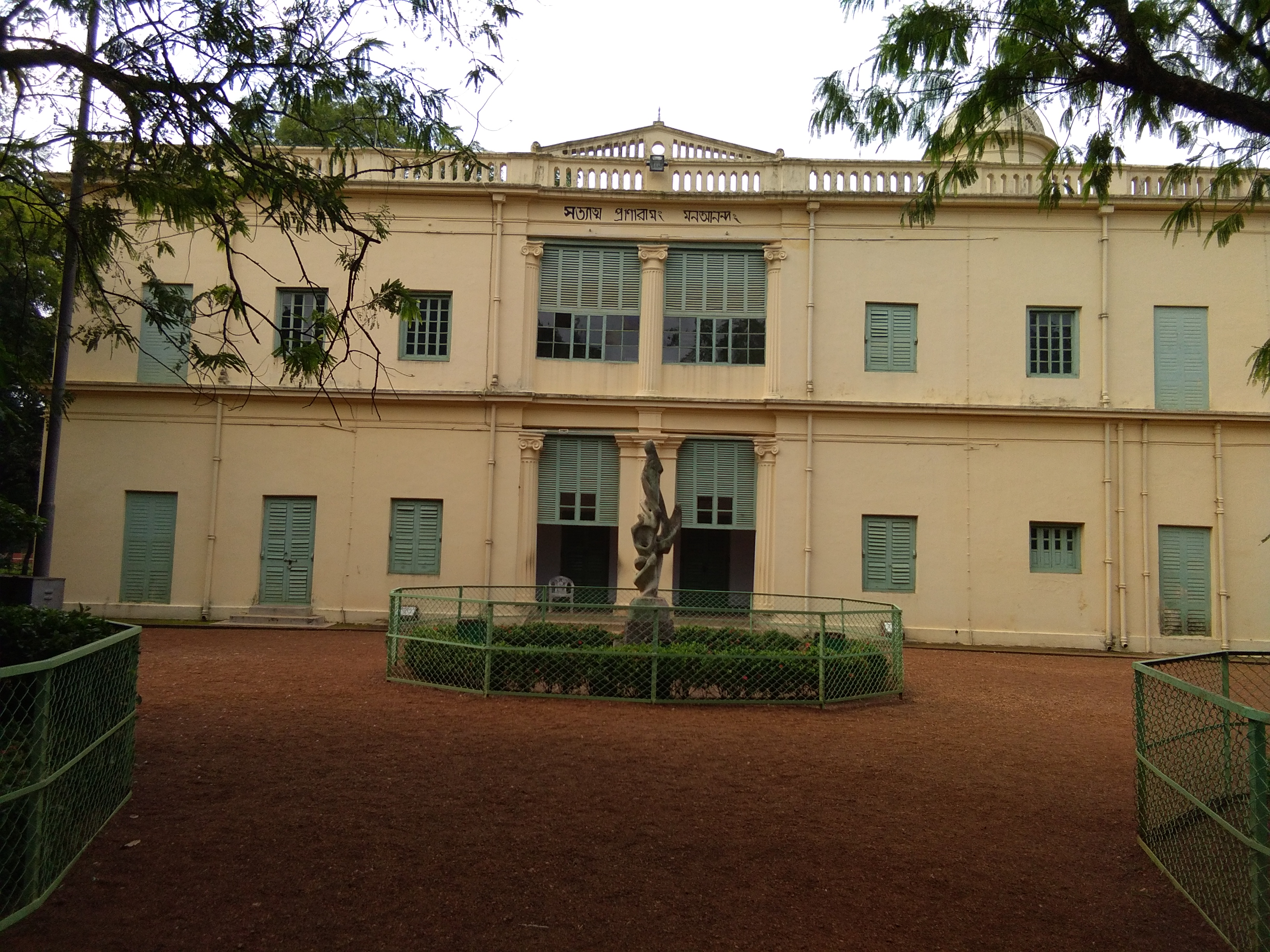
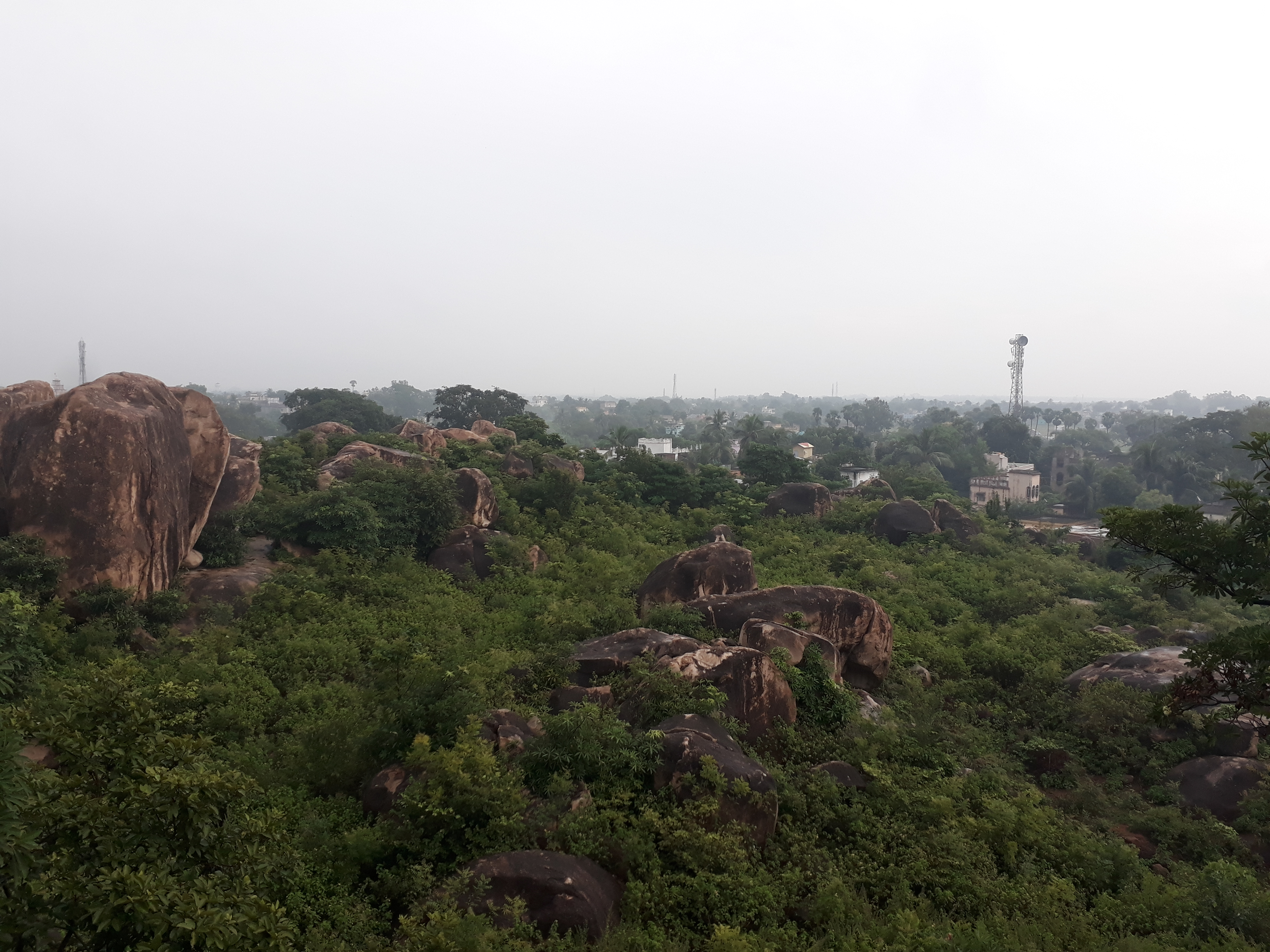
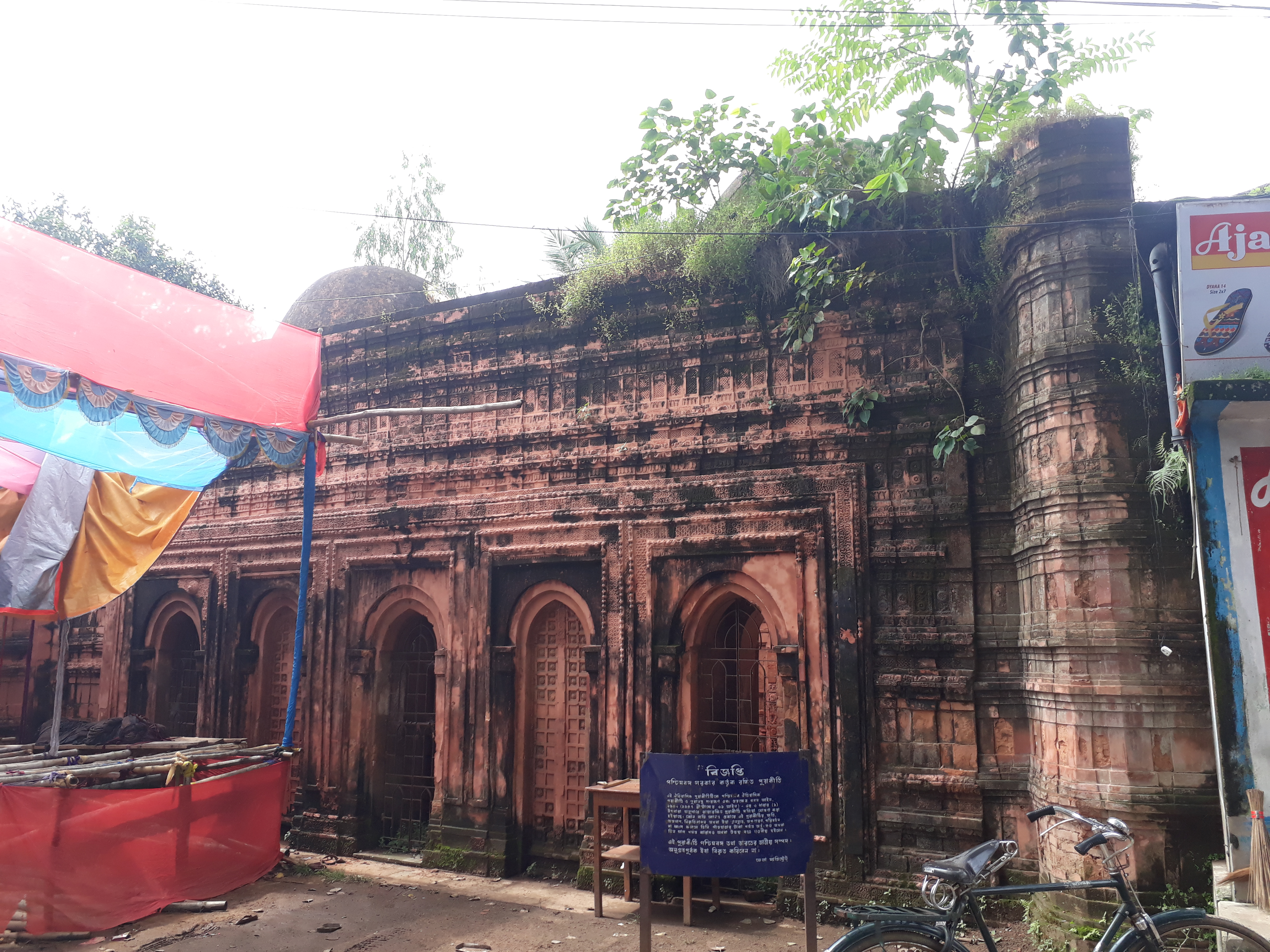
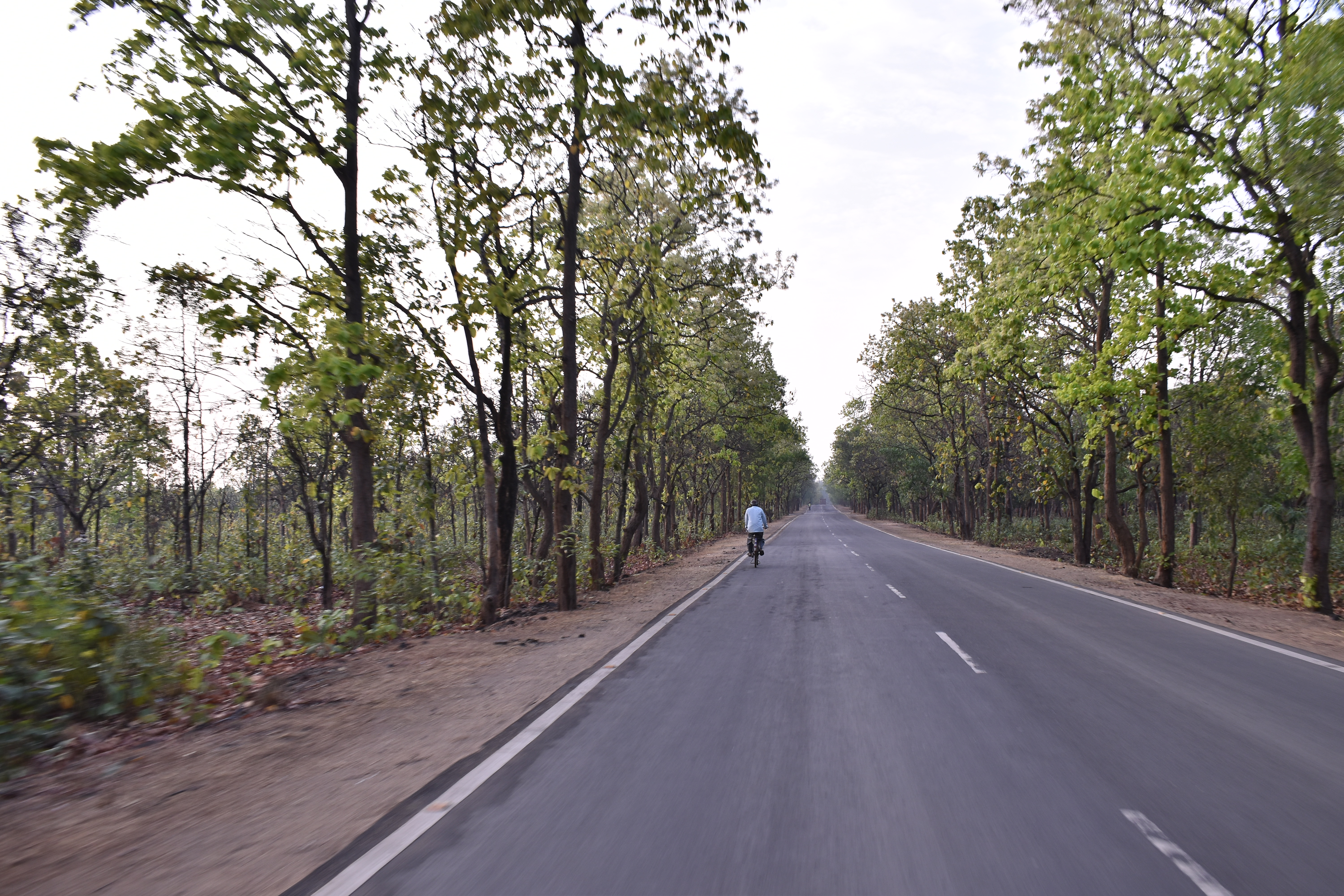
- Clockwise from top-left: Tarapeeth Temple in Rampurhat, Tagore's home at Shantiniketan, Monuments at Rajnagar, Seorakuri forest, Mama Bhagne Hills
- Interactive map of Birbhum district
- Coordinates: 23.910°N 87.527°E
- Country: India
- State: West Bengal
- Division: Burdwan
- Headquarters: Suri

Government
  - Subdivisions: Suri Sadar, Bolpur, Rampurhat
  - CD Blocks: Mohammad Bazar, Rajnagar, Suri I, Suri II, Sainthia, Dubrajpur, Khoyrasol, Labpur, Nanoor, Bolpur Sriniketan, Ilambazar, Murarai I, Murarai II, Nalhati I, Nalhati II, Rampurhat I, Rampurhat II, Mayureswar I, Mayureswar II
  - Lok Sabha constituencies: Bolpur, Birbhum
  - Vidhan Sabha constituencies: Dubrajpur, Suri, Bolpur, Nanoor, Labpur, Sainthia, Mayureswar, Rampurhat, Hansan, Nalhati, Murarai
  - District Magistrate: Dhaval Jain, I.A.S

Area
  - Total: 4,545 km^{2} (1,755 sq mi)

Population (2011)
  - Total: 4,060,000
  - Density: 893/km^{2} (2,310/sq mi)
  - Urban: 449,448

Demographics
  - Literacy: 70.9 per cent
  - Sex ratio: 956 ♂/♀

Languages
  - Official: Bengali
  - Additional official: English
- Time zone: UTC+05:30 (IST)
- Website: birbhum.gov.in

Birbhum district (Bengali pronunciation: [biːrbʰuːm]) is an administrative unit in the Indian state of West Bengal. It is the northernmost district of Burdwan division—one of the five administrative divisions of West Bengal. The district headquarters is in Suri. Other important cities are Rampurhat, Bolpur and Sainthia. Jamtara, Dumka and Pakur districts of the state of Jharkhand lie at the western border of this district; the border in other directions is covered by the districts of Bardhaman of Purba Bardhaman, Paschim Bardhaman and Murshidabad of West Bengal.

Often called "the land of red soil", Birbhum is noted for its topography and its cultural heritage which is somewhat different from the other districts in West Bengal. The western part of Birbhum is a bushy region, a part of the Chota Nagpur Plateau. This region gradually merges with the fertile alluvial farmlands in the east.

This district saw many cultural and religious movements in history. Tarapith is a Hindu pilgrimage site located at 9km distance from Rampurhat city, which is one of the prominent places in Birbhum where every day a large number of pilgrims from across the country, neighboring states, and even abroad gather.This town is particularly known for the Tarapith Temple and its adjoining Hindu crematory ground. The Visva Bharati University at Santiniketan, established by Rabindranath Tagore, is one of the places Birbhum is known for. Many festivals are celebrated in the district, including Poush Mela.

Birbhum is primarily an agricultural district with around 75.09% of the population being dependent on agriculture. Principal industries of the district include cotton and silk harvesting and weaving, rice and oilseed milling, lac harvesting, stone mining and metalware and pottery manufacture. Bakreshwar Thermal Power Station is the only heavy industry in the district.

== Etymology ==
The name Birbhum comes probably from the term 'land' ('bhumi') of the 'brave' ('bir') or Bir king'). Another theory says that the district bears the name of Bagdi king Bir Malla, who ruled in the area from 1501 to 1554 CE. Bir in the Santali language means forests; therefore, Birbhum could also mean a land of forests.

== Geography ==
Map of Birbhum district showing CD blocks and municipal areas

Situated between 23° 32' 30" (right above the tropic of cancer) and 24° 35' 0" north latitude and 87° 5' 25" and 88° 1' 40" east longitudes, and about 4,545 square kilometres (1,755 sq mi) in area, this district is triangular. River Ajay forms the southern base and the apex of the triangle points north. The river forms the boundary between the districts of Birbhum and Bardhaman. The state of Jharkhand is at the northern and the western border of Birbhum and Murshidabad is at the east.

Geographically, this area lies at the northeastern end of the Chota Nagpur Plateau, as it slopes down and merges with the alluvial plains of the Ganges. In the district there is only hilly area of natural rock formation situated near Dubrajpur town called Mama Bhagne Pahar (Hills). The western portion of the district is historically known as Vajjabhumi or Bajrabhumi. It is an undulating upland that is generally barren. The comparatively more fertile eastern portion, constituting the northeastern Rarh region, merges with the Gangetic plain. Vajjabhumi is included in the Rarh region, and the rest of Rarh is called Sumha to differentiate it from Vajjabhumi.

Subdivision-wise Statistics of Birbhum District (2011 Census)
Subdivision	Headquarters	Area (km^{2}) (2001)	Population (2011)	Rural population (%)	Urban population (%)
Rampurhat	Rampurhat	1,574.23	1,508,506	96.62	3.38
Suri Sadar	Suri	1,782.72	1,121,871	96.57	3.43
Bolpur	Bolpur	1,186.66	872,027	96.56	3.44
Birbhum district (Total)	–	4,545.00	3,502,404	96.59	3.41

=== Climate ===
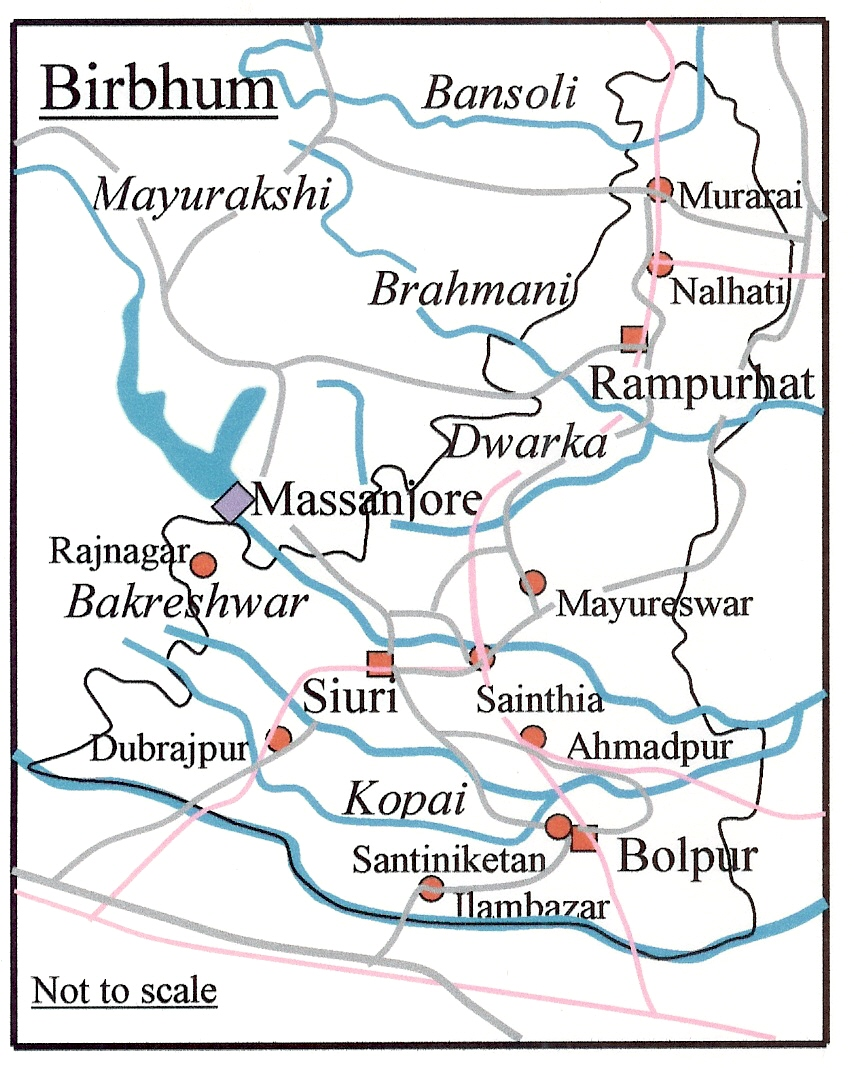
Rivers and towns of Birbhum

The climate on the western side is dry and extreme but is relatively milder on the eastern side. During summer, the temperature can shoot well above 40 °C (104 °F) and in winters it can drop to around 6 °C (43 °F). Rainfall is higher in the western areas as compared to the eastern areas. The annual average rainfall in Rajnagar is 1,405 millimetres (55.3 in) and in Nanoor it is 1,212 millimetres (47.7 in), mostly in the monsoon months (June to October).

Climate and rainfall chart of Birbhum District:

Month	Normal rainfall (in mm)
January	9.7
February	23.2
March	23.3
April	40.7
May	88.7
June	234.2
July	324.5
August	295.7
September	258.2
October	105.4
November	17.5
December	9.4
Yearly	1430.5

=== Rivers ===
A number of rivers flow across Birbhum. Some of the most notable include Ajay, Mayurakshi, Kopai, Bakreshwar, Brahmani, Dwarka, Hinglo, and Bansloi. Almost all the rivers originate higher up on the Chota Nagpur plateau and flow across Birbhum in a west–east direction. During the monsoon season, the rivers flow high and swift compared to the dry summer season, resulting in a cycle of floods and droughts. The Mayurakshi provides irrigation for about 2,428 square kilometres (937 sq mi).

== History ==
=== Prehistory ===
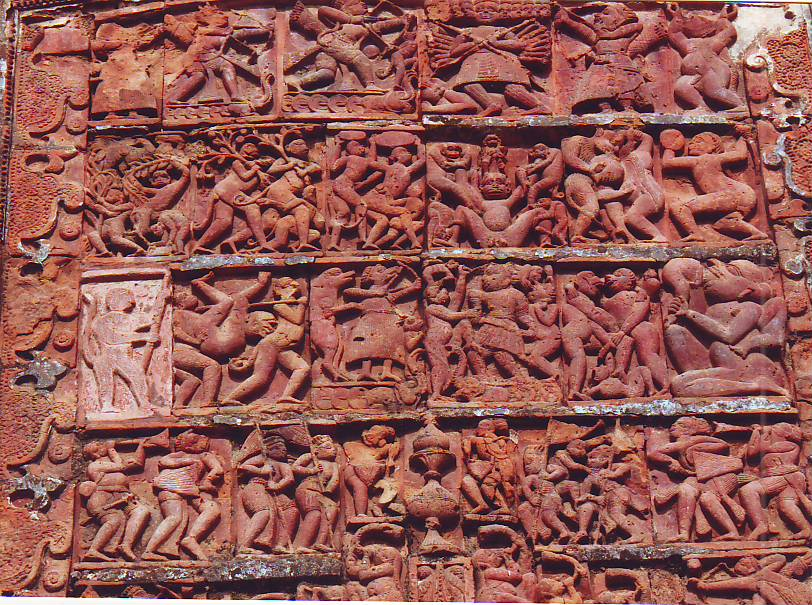
Terracota design depicting Ramayana war at Jayadev Kenduli

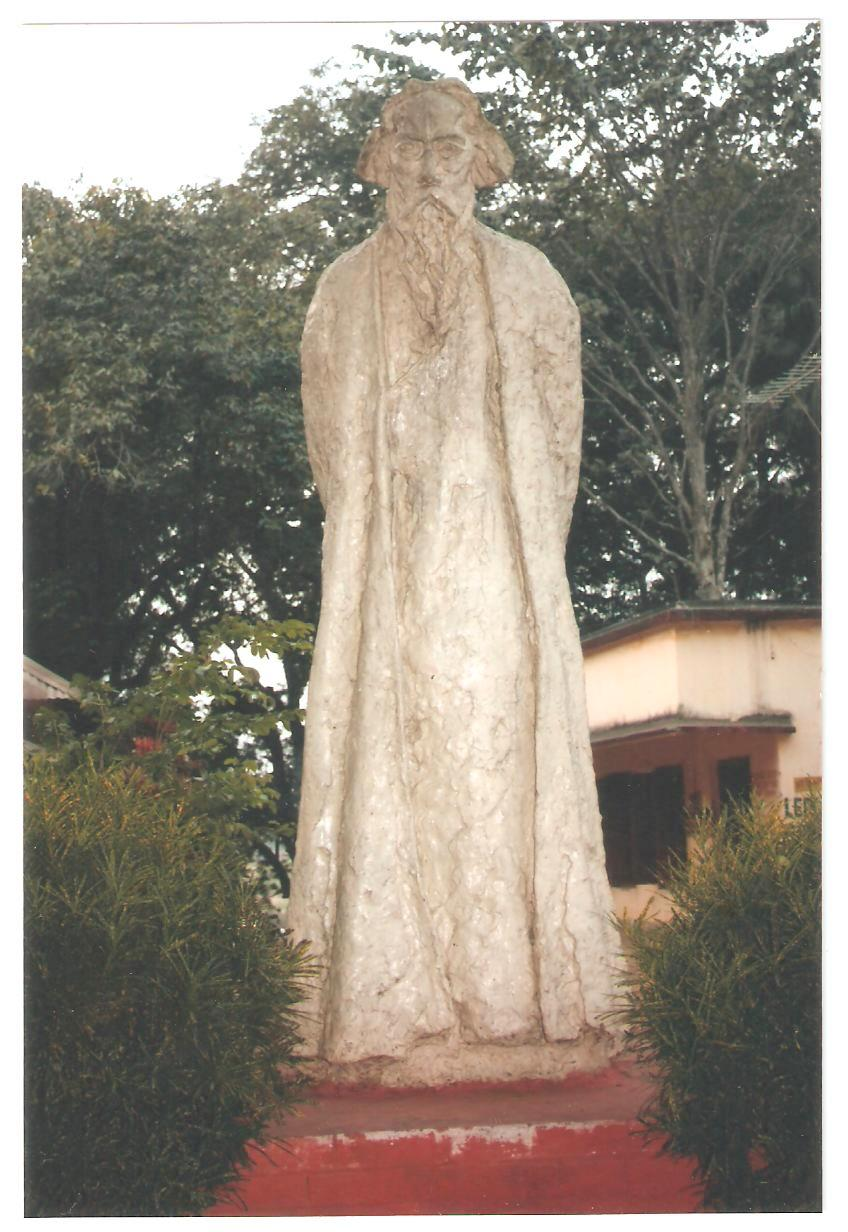
Statue of Rabindranath Tagore by K P Krishnakumar at Amar Kutir

The area now known as Birbhum was inhabited from pre-historic times. Some of the archaeological sites related to Pandu Rajar Dhibi of Chalcolithic remains are located in Birbhum. Stone age implements have been found at several places in the district.

According to the old Jain book Acaranga Sutra, the last (24th) great Tirthankara Mahavira had wandered through this land, referred to as the "pathless country of Ladha in Vajjabhumi and Subbhabhumi (probably Suhma)" in the fifth century BCE. According to some historians, the spread of Jainism and Buddhism in the Rarh region was part of the process of Aryanisation of the area. Based on Divyabdan, a Buddhist text, Dr. Atul Sur has inferred that Gautam Buddha probably traversed this area to go to Pundravardhana and Samatata.

The Rarh region, once a part of the Maurya Empire was later included in the empires of the imperial Guptas, Shashanka and Harshavardhana. After dismemberment of Harshavardhana's empire, the region was ruled by the Palas, under whose rule Buddhism, particularly the Vajrayana cult, flourished. In the seventh century CE, the Chinese traveller Xuanzang described some of the monasteries he visited in the region. In the 12th century CE, the Sena dynasty took control of the area.

=== Medieval age ===
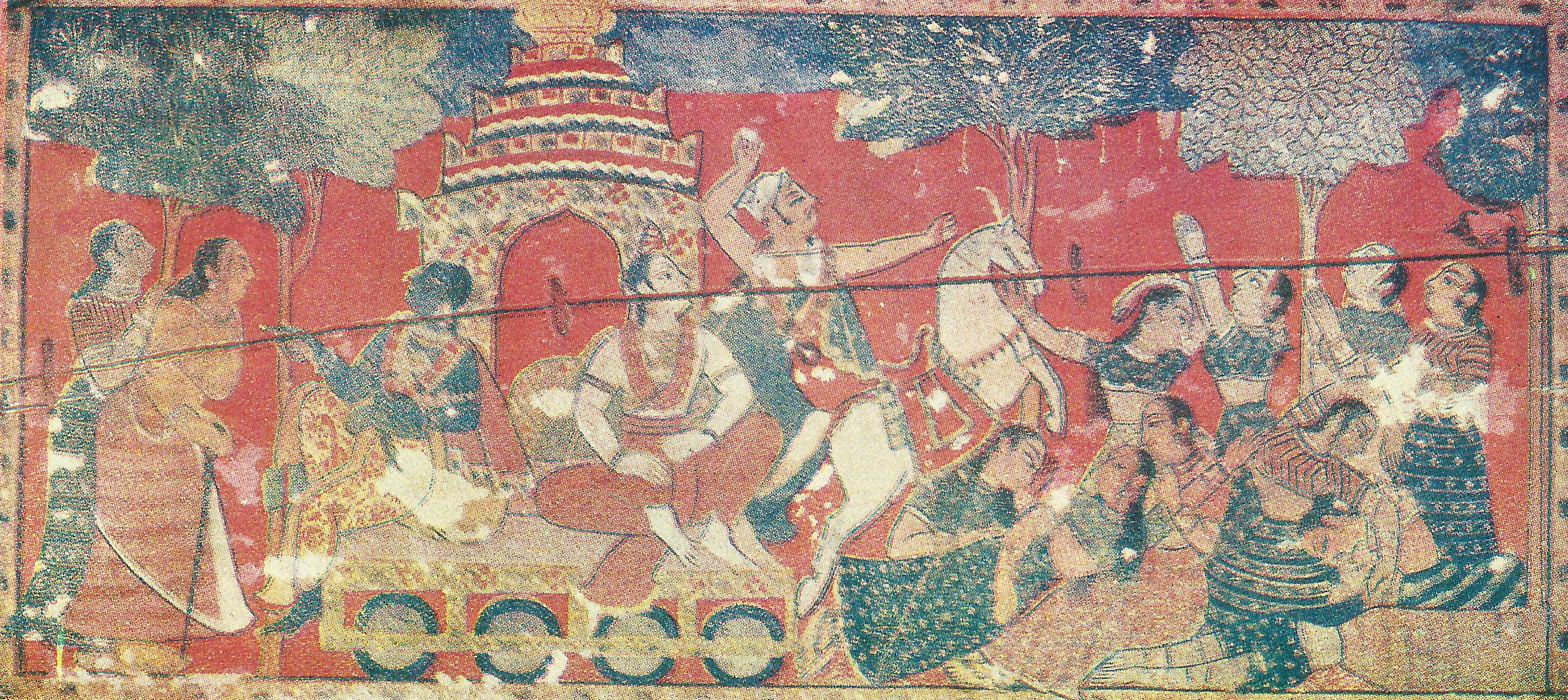
Krishna travelling to Mathura in a 17th-century painting from Birbhum

The region was ruled by Muslims in the 13th century CE, although their control over the western parts of the district appears to have been minimal, with true power resting in the hands of the local Hindu chiefs, known as the Bir Rajas (Bagdi Malla dynasty). The towns of Hetampur, Birsinghpur and Rajnagar contain their relics. Hetampur and Rajnagar kingdoms ruled most of Birbhum and parts of Burdwan, Maldah and Jharkhand from Dubrajpur (meaning two kingdoms – Hetampur & Rajnagar). Minhaj-i-Siraj, the author of the Tabaqat-i-Nasiri, mentions Lakhnur as the thanah (headquarters) of the Rarh wing of the Muslim rule and an important frontier post. The location of Lakhnur, though not yet identified, falls in Birbhum.

=== Colonial era ===
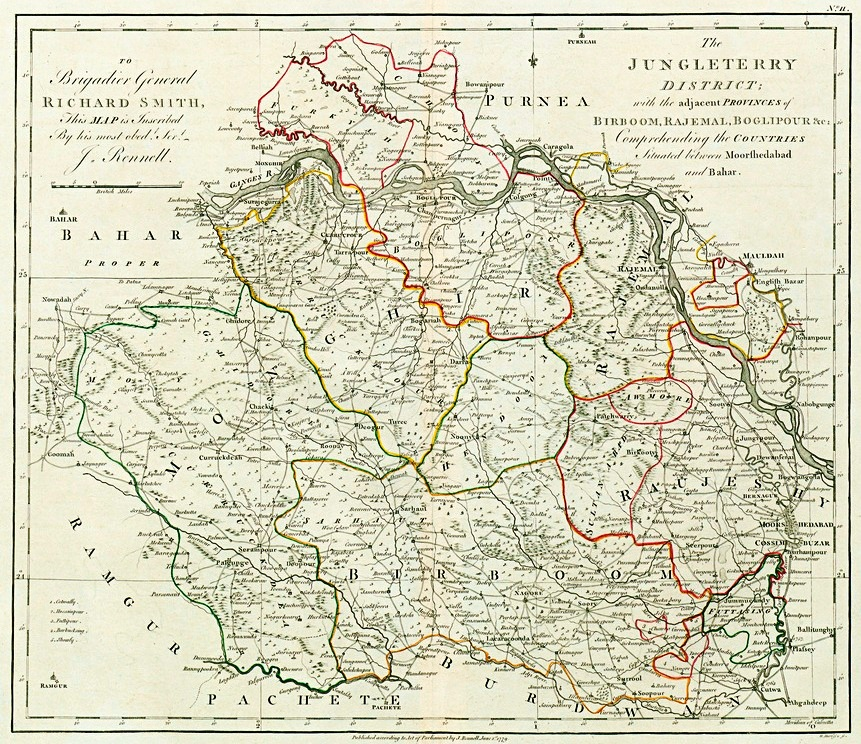
1779 map of the Jungle Terry District.

The area which is now Birbhum district was badly impacted by the Great Bengal famine of 1770. Many villages were wiped out entirely, and even in large towns, over three quarters of households perished.

The administrative unit called Birbhum was first formed in 1787 under the British East India Company, as "District Beerbhoom". The area had previously been administered as a part of Murshidabad district. The original district was much larger than its modern incarnation.

In the late 18th century, Birbhum and surrounding areas were affected by more famines followed by a peasants' insurrection. Although the insurrection primarily targeted zamindars and the government, trading and manufacturing centres were also looted. In June 1789, the manufacturing town of Ilambazar was sacked, although it recovered and became a magnet for manufacturing and trade.

Until 1793, Birbhum included "Bishenpore" or Bishnupur, which is now part of the Bankura district. Until the 1857 Sepoy Mutiny, the Santhal Parganas was part of Birbhum; the district thus sprawled up to Deoghar in the west. The immediate reason then for separating the western tribal majority areas was the Santhal rebellion of 1855–56. In 1872, Birbhum district comprises 1,344 square miles (3,480 km^{2}) area with 695,921 inhabitants.

== Economy ==
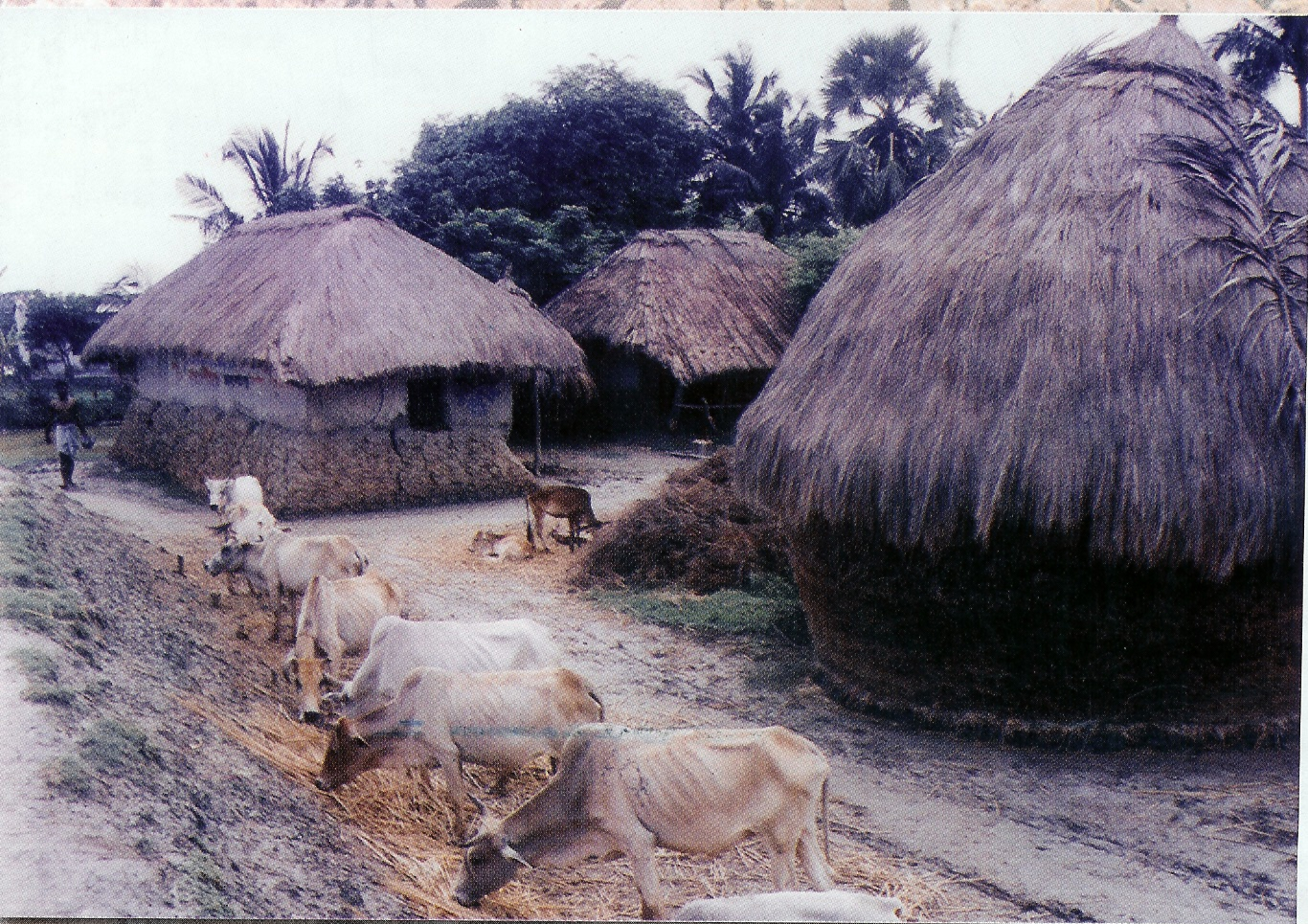
A common Birbhum village scene

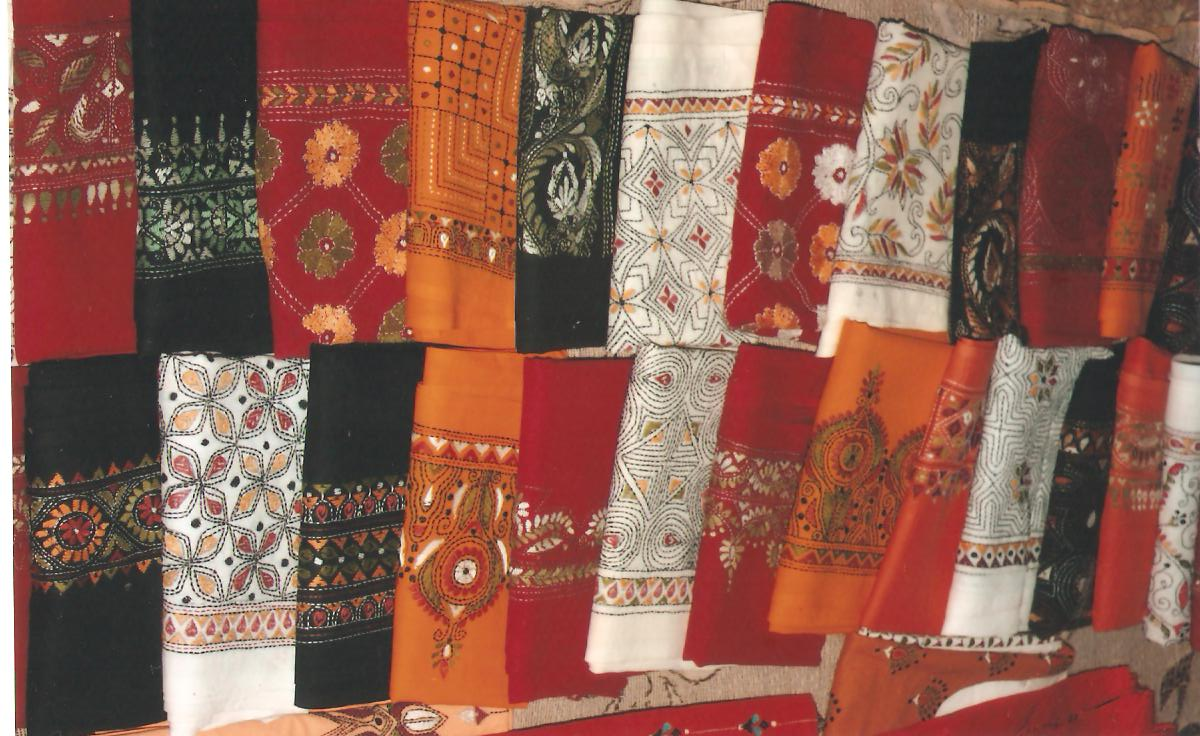
Product display of Amar Kutir

Birbhum is primarily an agricultural district with around 75% of the people dependent on agriculture. While 159.3 km^{2} (61.5 sq mi) of land is occupied by forests, 3,329.05 km^{2} (1,285.35 sq mi) of land is used for agricultural purposes. 91.02% of the population live in villages. Out of total 4,50,313 farmers(holding 3,20,610 hectares of land), 3,59,404 are marginal farmers(holding 1,41,813 hectares altogether), 63,374 are small farmers(holding 95,144 hectares altogether), 26,236 are semi-medium farmers(holding 76,998 hectares altogether), 1,290 are medium farmers(holding 6,215 hectare altogether), and 9 are large farmers (holding 440 hectares of land). The average size of land holding per farmer is 0.71 hectares. 6,07,172 people work as agricultural labourers in Birbhum. Major crops produced in the district include rice, legumes, wheat, corn (maize), potatoes and sugar cane. The district has thirteen cold storages. Land with irrigation facilities in 2001-02 totalled 2,763.9 km^{2} (1,067.1 sq mi). There are five barrages, providing irrigation support. Canada Dam on the Mayurakshi river at Massanjore lies close to the border of Birbhum and the Dumka district in Jharkhand. Further down the Mayurakshi is the Tilpara Barrage at Suri.

Birbhum is a major centre of cottage industries. Perhaps the most notable cottage industry is a non-profit rural organisation named Amar Kutir. Other main industries in Birbhum are agriculture-based industries, textiles, forestry, arts and crafts. Sriniketan is noted for its dairy industry and as a forestry centre. Some of the notable forms of cottage industries of Birbhum include textile—especially cotton and locally harvested tussar silk, jute works, batik, kantha stitch, macramé (weaving by knotting threads), leather, pottery and terracotta, solapith, woodcarving, bamboo and cane craft, metal works and tribal crafts. There are 8,883 small and medium scale industries. Principal industries of the district include cotton and silk harvesting and weaving, rice and oilseed milling, lac harvesting, and metalware and pottery manufacture. Bakreshwar Thermal Power Station (210 MW x 3 + 210 MW x 2 under construction) is the only heavy industry in the district.

Sainthia is known as business capital of Birbhum and an economically important city. Sainthia is the major centre for export and import of cottage industries. As the business epicenter of Birbhum, Sainthia was home to a prominent coconut oil manufacturer established by the Chandra family. 'Lion (সিংহ) Marka' (Lion Brand) coconut oil, which was manufactured and processed in a factory located in main Sainthia. This iconic brand not only gained statewide and national recognition but also became a symbol of the Sainthia's industrial prowess, significantly contributing to its economic growth. The factory's operations, which spanned from the 1950s to nearly 45 years, were a cornerstone of Sainthia's prominence until they ceased in 1992. Today, plenty of large, semi-large scale businesses run in this city, credit to its well connected logistics and rail network. Moreover, the economy stands tall credit to sales of agricultural based products.

In 2006 the Ministry of Panchayati Raj named Birbhum one of the country's 250 most backward districts (out of a total of 640). It is one of the eleven districts in West Bengal currently receiving funds from the Backward Regions Grant Fund Programme (BRGF).

== Political and administrative divisions ==
The district comprises three subdivisions: Suri Sadar, Bolpur and Rampurhat. Suri is the district headquarters. There are 26 police stations, 19 development blocks, 6 municipalities and 167 gram panchayats in this district. Other than municipality area, each subdivision contains community development blocs which in turn are divided into rural areas and census towns. There are seven urban units: six municipalities and one census town. The latest amongst the urban units to have a municipality was Nalhati in 2000.

Before delimitation the district was divided into 12 assembly constituencies (AC): Nanoor (AC #283), Bolpur (AC #284), Labhpur (AC #285), Dubrajpur (AC #286), Rajnagar (AC #287), Suri (AC #288), Mahammad Bazar (AC #289), Mayureswar (AC #290), Rampurhat (AC #291), Hansan (AC #292), Nalhati (AC #293) and Murarai (AC #294). The constituencies of Nanoor, Rajnagar, Mayureswar and Hansan were reserved for Scheduled Castes (SC) candidates. Vidhan Sabha was elected in 2006 assembly elections, which took place before the rearrangement of parliamentary and assembly constituencies as per order of the Delimitation Commission in respect of the delimitation of constituencies in the West Bengal. Delimitation was made effective for all elections in the state of West Bengal that was held on or after 19 February 2008. 2009 Indian general election was based on the newly formed parliamentary constituencies and the newly formed assembly constituencies have representatives in the 2011 elections of West Bengal.

=== Assembly constituencies ===
As per order of the Delimitation Commission in respect of the delimitation of constituencies in the West Bengal, the district is divided into 11 assembly constituencies:

No.	Name	Lok Sabha	MLA	2026 Winner	2024 Lead
284	Dubrajpur (SC)	Birbhum	Anup Kumar Saha	Bharatiya Janata Party	Trinamool Congress
285	Suri	Birbhum	Jagannath Chattopadhyay	Bharatiya Janata Party	Trinamool Congress
286	Bolpur	Bolpur	Chandranath Sinha	Trinamool Congress	Trinamool Congress
287	Nanoor (SC)	Bolpur	Bidhan Chandra Majhi	Trinamool Congress	Trinamool Congress
288	Labpur	Bolpur	Debasish Ojha	Bharatiya Janata Party	Trinamool Congress
289	Sainthia (SC)	Birbhum	Krishna Kanta Saha	Bharatiya Janata Party	Trinamool Congress
290	Mayureswar	Bolpur	Dudh Kumar Mondal	Bharatiya Janata Party	Trinamool Congress
291	Rampurhat	Birbhum	Dhruba Saha	Bharatiya Janata Party	Trinamool Congress
292	Hansan	Birbhum	Fayezul Haque	Trinamool Congress	Trinamool Congress
293	Nalhati	Birbhum	Rajendra Prasad Singh	Trinamool Congress	Trinamool Congress
294	Murarai	Birbhum	Mosarraf Hossain	Trinamool Congress	Trinamool Congress

Dubrajpur, Suri, Mayureswar, Rampurhat, Hansan, Nalhati and Murarai assembly segments form the Birbhum (Lok Sabha constituency). Bolpur, Nanoor, Labhpur, and Sainthia constituencies are part of Bolpur (Lok Sabha constituency), which will contain three other assembly segments from Bardhaman district.

== Transport ==
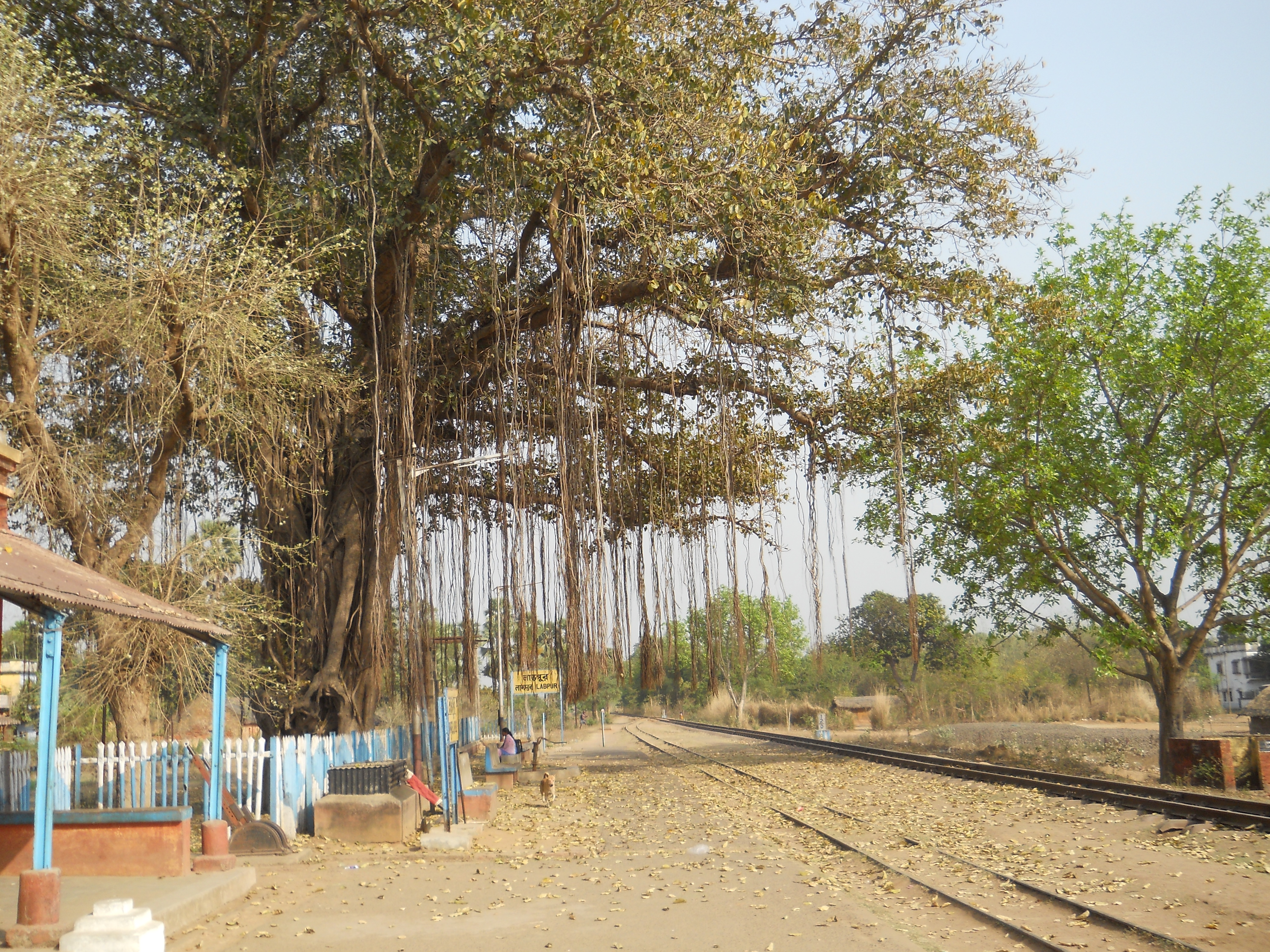
Katwa to Ahmedpur Narrow gauge railway

The Panagarh–Morgram Highway runs through the district. All the towns and villages are connected by roads. The total length of roads in the district are: surfaced–2,413 km (1,499 mi) and unsurfaced–4,674 km (2,904 mi). Against this the total length of rail track in the district is 201.32 km (125.09 mi), including 26.55 km (16.50 mi) of the Ahmadpur-Katwa line, laid in 1917. The Sahibganj Loop of the Eastern Railway, laid in 1862, passes through this district. Rampurhat Junction is the most busiest railway station of this district. There is a junction at Nalhati for the connection to Azimganj in Murshidabad district. The Andal-Sainthia Branch Line connects it to the main Howrah-Delhi main line at Andal.

== Demographics ==
Historical population
Year	Pop.	±% p.a.
1901	902,280	—
1911	940,162	+0.41%
1921	851,725	−0.98%
1931	947,554	+1.07%
1941	1,048,317	+1.02%
1951	1,066,889	+0.18%
1961	1,446,158	+3.09%
1971	1,775,909	+2.08%
1981	2,095,829	+1.67%
1991	2,555,664	+2.00%
2001	3,015,422	+1.67%
2011	3,502,404	+1.51%
Source: Registrar General and Census Commissioner of India

In 1901, Birbhum had a population of 902,280, which by 1981 rose to 2,095,829. According to the 2001 census data, the total population has further risen to 3,015,422. The following table summarises the population distribution:

Rural/Urban	Persons	Males	Females
Total	3,015,422	1,546,633	1,468,789
Rural	2,757,002	1,414,097	1,342,905
Urban	258,420	132,536	125,884

According to the 2011 census Birbhum district has a population of 3,502,404, roughly equal to the nation of Lithuania or the US state of Connecticut. This gives it a ranking of 84th in India (out of a total of 640). The district has a population density of 771 inhabitants per square kilometre (2,000/sq mi). Its population growth rate over the decade 2001-2011 was 16.15%. Birbhum has a sex ratio of 956 females for every 1000 males, and a literacy rate of 70.9%. 12.83% of the population lives in urban areas. Scheduled Castes and Scheduled Tribes made up 29.50% and 6.92% of the population respectively. Other than those speaking the local dialect of Bengali, there are tribal Santhals and ten other tribal communities in Birbhum with some presence, amongst whom Koda, Mahali and Oraons are more common.

=== Religion ===
Religions of Birbhum District (2011)
Religion	Percent
Hinduism	62.28%
Islam	37.06%
Other or not stated	0.66%

Religion	Population (1941)	Percentage (1941)	Population (1951)	Percentage (1951)	Population (2011)	Percentage (2011)
Hinduism	686,436	65.48%	774,527	72.60%	2,181,515	62.28%
Islam	287,310	27.41%	286,518	26.86%	1,298,054	37.06%
Tribal religion (Note: In the 1941 census all tribals were counted under 'Tribal' religion, irrespective of their actual religion.)	71,073	6.78%	4,661	0.44%	6,051	0.17%
Others (Note: Including Jainism, Christianity, Buddhism, Zoroastrianism, Judaism, Ad-Dharmis, or not stated)	3,498	0.33%			17,727	0.51%
Total Population	1,048,317	100	1,066,889	100%	3,502,404	100%
Notes:

According to 2011 Indian census, Hindus formed around 62% of the total population and Muslims over 37%. Muslims are in majority in Murarai I (58.92%), Murarai II (75.00%) and Nalhati II (70.10%) CD blocks in the northeast of the district, and have a significant presence in Nalhati I (46.64%), Rampurhat II (48.20%), and Ilambazar (47.40%) CD blocks. Others, including religious groups and non-religion population fall below 1% of the population. In the 2001 Indian census of the district, Hindus formed 64.49% of the population while 35.08% were Muslims. There is a sprinkling of other religious groups in the population.

CD block	Hindu %	Muslim %	Other %
Murarai I	40.58	58.92	0.5
Murarai II	24.91	75.00	0.09
Nalhati I	52.11	46.64	1.25
Nalhati II	29.79	70.10	0.11
Rampurhat I	67.38	30.61	2.01
Rampurhat II	51.64	48.20	0.16
Mayureswar I	69.84	29.33	0.83
Mayureswar II	74.06	25.65	0.29
Mohammad Bazar	67.15	31.29	1.56
Rajnagar	84.74	14.27	0.99
Suri I	73.02	26.59	0.39
Suri II	67.70	31.59	0.71
Sainthia	77.68	21.46	0.86
Labpur	69.24	30.54	0.22
Nanoor	64.71	34.97	0.32
Bolpur Sriniketan	73.92	25.45	0.63
Illambazar	51.67	47.40	0.93
Dubrajpur	66.52	33.22	0.26
Khoyrasol	75.51	24.3	0.19
Area not under any Sub-district	75.88	23.41	0.71

=== Language ===
Languages of Birbhum District (2011).
1. Bengali (92.4%)
2. Santali (6.01%)
3. Others (1.61%)

At the time of the 2011 census, 92.38% of the population spoke Bengali and 6.01% Santali as their first language.

== Culture ==
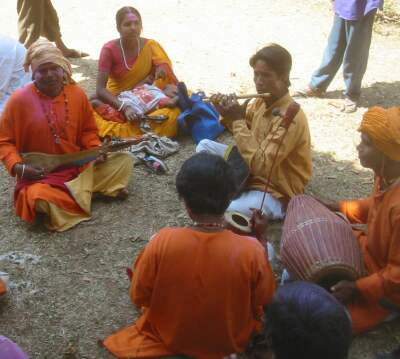
Baul singers at Santiniketan

The bauls of Birbhum, their philosophy and their songs form a notable representation of the folk culture of the district. Birbhum has been home to kabiyals, kirtaniyas and other folk culture groups.

The numerous fairs in Birbhum start with Poush Mela at Santiniketan and follows through the Bengali month of Poush until Makar Sankranti. Particularly lively is the fair at Jaydev Kenduli. Festivities are organised across the seasons. People of Birbhum patronise folk entertainment programmes such as jatra, kavigan, raibenshe and alkap.

Many poets were born in this district, as for example, Chandidas (Rami). In addition to being a confluence of Vaishnava, Shakta and Saiva cultures, Birbhum villages observe ancient customs like worship of gramdevta (gram means village and devta means deity) in many forms.

Amongst the major attractions of Birbhum are Bakreshwar, Tarapith Temple, Dwarbasini temple at Chondrapur, Fullara at Labpur and Patharchapuri. Birbhum has many old temples, such as the ones at Jaydev Kenduli, Surul and Nanoor, with delicate decorative tiles made of terra cotta (burnt clay).

== Flora and fauna ==
The eastern area of Birbhum is a part of the rice plains of West Bengal, and the vegetation includes usual characteristics of rice fields in Bengal, such as species of Aponogeton, Utricularia, Drosera, Philcoxia, Scrophulariaceae and similar aquatic or palustrine genera. In the drier western region of the district, the characteristic shrubs and herbs include species of Wendlandia, Convolvulaceae, Stipa, Tragus, Spermacoce, Ziziphus, Capparis and similar plants that grows on laterite soil. Mango, palm, and bamboo are among common trees in Birbhum. Other common species of plants include jackfruit, arjun, sal, guava, kend and mahua.

Other than feral dogs and domestic cattle, the most frequently encountered non-human mammal is the hanuman, a long tailed grey langur prevalent in the Gangetic plain. Some wild boars and wolves may still be spotted in the small forests of Chinpai, Bandarsol and Charicha. Leopards and bears are not to be seen any more in the wild. Sometimes during the season when mahua trees bloom, wild Asiatic elephants from Jharkhand come in trampling crops and threatening life and property. Birds of Birbhum include a mix of hilly and plain-land dwelling species like partridge, pigeon, green pigeon, water fowls, doyel, Indian robin, drongo, hawk, cuckoo, koel, sunbird, Indian roller, parrot, babbler, and some migratory birds.

Ballabhpur Wildlife Sanctuary near Santiniketan was declared a sanctuary in 1977. Economically important trees are planted here and blackbucks, spotted deer, jackals, foxes and a variety of water birds live in its 2 km^{2} (0.8 mi^{2}).

== Literacy and education ==
Educational facilities in Birbhum district:
High School–256
Higher Secondary School–110
Junior High School–95
Junior High Madarsa–10
Senior Madarsa–4
Primary School–237
Sishu Sikhsha Kendra–495
Anganwadi Centre–2407
College–12
University–1
Engineering colleges–2
Polytechnic–1
Industrial Training Institute (ITI)–1

According to the 2011 census Birbhum district had a literacy rate of 70.9%. up from 62.16% in 2001. In 1951 census, the literacy rate was 17.74%. It increased to 48.56% in 1991.

The growth of literacy in the last decade of the twentieth century was particularly remarkable with special emphasis on the eradication of illiteracy. While it is feared that Birbhum may not be able to fulfill the national objective of sending all children in the age group 6–14 years to school by 2010, efforts are on in that direction.

The district has 127 libraries supported by the government, one private library and one district library.

== Sports ==
One of the most popular outdoor sports in the villages of Birbhum used to be danguli (literal meaning "ball and stick"). However, in recent times cricket has replaced some of its popularity. A major cricket event named as: Dream Gold Cup is organised in Labpur every year in the month of January. Cricket teams from all over the state comes for participation. It is played in the Stadium field in Sasthinagar. A sport that can be played outdoors and indoors and is popular among children is marbles, which involves projecting a striker bead with fingers to hit an ensemble of black or green glass beads.

In addition to cricket, the other most popular outdoor sports of this district are football and kabadi and volleyball.

== Notable people ==
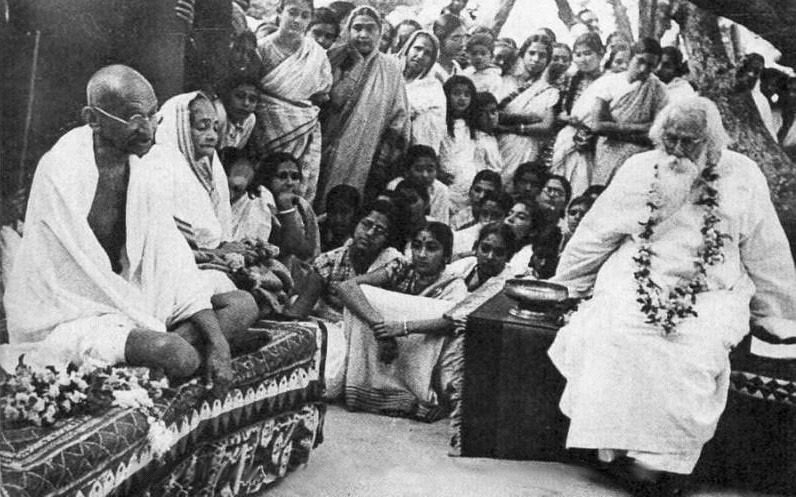
Rabindranath Tagore with Mahatma Gandhi and Kasturba Gandhi at Santiniketan in 1940

- Rabindranath Tagore, polymath and founder of Visva-Bharati University
- Amartya Sen, economist and Nobel laureate
- Pranab Mukherjee, 13th President of India
- Justice Abdus Sattar (1906–1985), former President of Bangladesh
- Ananda Mohan Chakrabarty, Indian American scientist; following the landmark Diamond v. Chakrabarty case granting patent-protection to a microorganism, he laid the foundations of modern biotech industry.
- Tarasankar Bandyopadhyay, Bengali novelist who was nominated three times for Nobel Prize in Literature from 1971 to 1973, but never won any.
- Satyendra Prasanna Sinha, prominent lawyer and statesman in British India
- Sumitra Devi, actress who worked in Hindi and Bengali cinema during the 1940s and 1950s
- Noor Alam Chowdhury (1943–2021), Chief Justice of the Calcutta High Court
- Nityananda Swami, co–founder of Gaudia-Vaishnavism, born at Ekachakra
- Sahana Bajpaie, Bengali singer-songwriter and one of the most prominent contemporary Rabindra Sangeet vocalists
- Ekram Ali (born 1950), Bengali poet and critic
- Ratan Kahar, folk singer
- Sutapa Biswas, British Indian conceptual artist
- Bhuban Badyakar, singer and street vendor

== Villages ==
- Harisara
- Hetampur
- Kondaipur
- Labpur
- Paikar
- Tejhati
