= Dubrajpur =

- Town
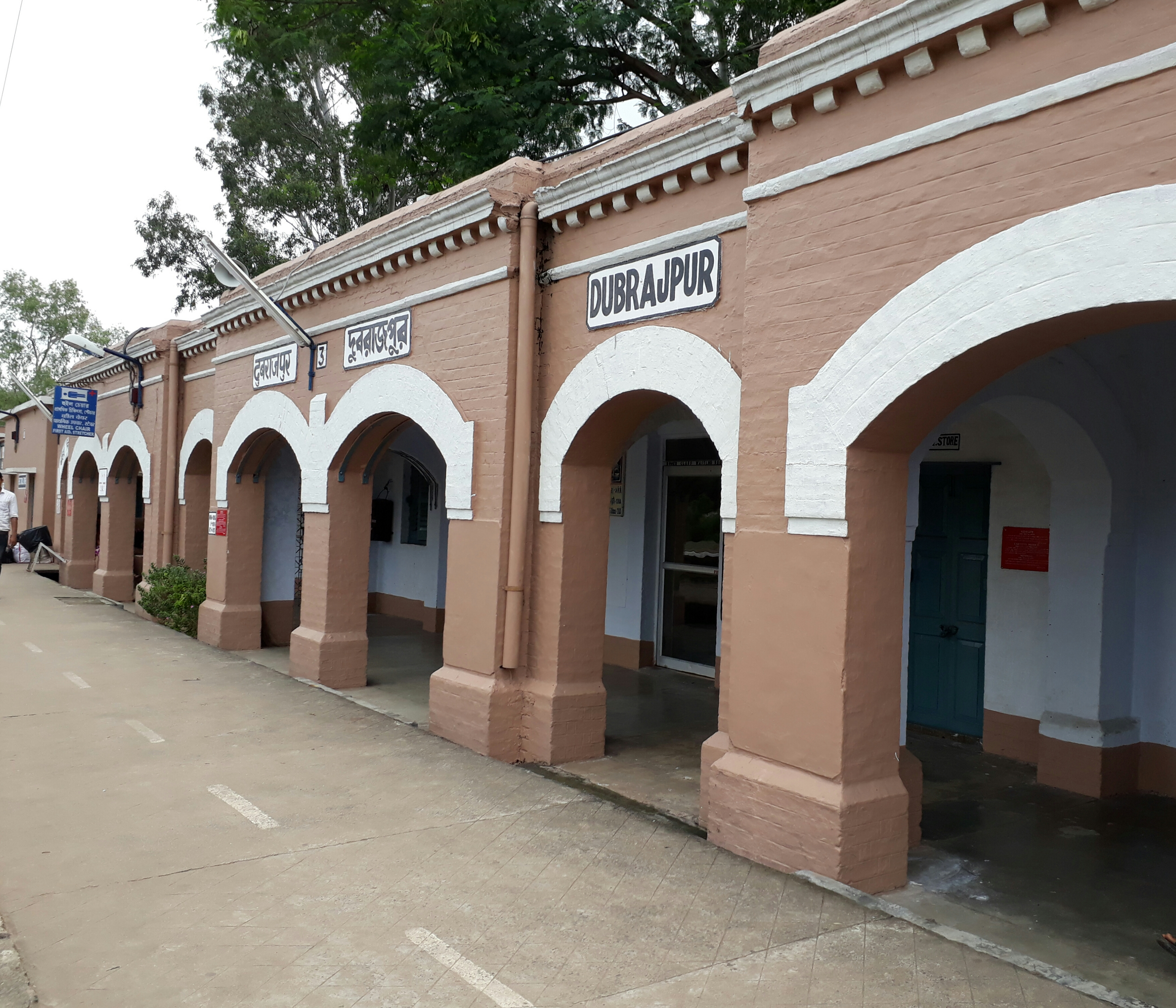
- Dubrajpur railway station

- Location in West Bengal, India Dubrajpur (India)
- Coordinates: 23.8°N 87.38°E
- Country: India
- State: West Bengal
- District: Birbhum

Government
  - Type: Municipality
  - Body: Dubrajpur Municipality
  - Chairman of Municipality: Shri Pijush Pandey
  - Member of Legislative Assembly: Shri Anup Saha

Area
  - Total: 16.84 km^{2} (6.50 sq mi)
- Elevation: 77 m (253 ft)

Population (2011)
  - Total: 38,041
  - Density: 2,259/km^{2} (5,851/sq mi)

Languages
  - Official: Bengali
- Time zone: UTC+5:30 (IST)
- PIN: 731123
- Telephone/STD code: 91 3462
- Lok Sabha constituency: Birbhum
- Vidhan Sabha constituency: Dubrajpur
- Website: birbhum.nic.in

Dubrajpur is a town and a municipality in Suri Sadar subdivision of Birbhum district in the Indian state of West Bengal.

== History ==
There is a Tuberculosis sanatorium established in 1954 and closed in 2000. It was inaugurated by the then Prime Minister, Jawaharlal Nehru.

== Geography ==
Cities and towns in Suri Sadar subdivision of Birbhum district
M: municipal city/ town, CT: census town, R: rural/ urban centre, B: Barrage.
Owing to space constraints in the small map, the actual locations in a larger map may vary slightly

=== Location ===
Dubrajpur is located at 23.8°N 87.38°E. It has an average elevation of 77 metres (252 feet).

=== Connectivity ===
The place has good connectivity with the rest of the state as well as other states such as Jharkhand, Bihar, Assam. NH 60 passes right through the place which connects the place with North Bengal, Bankura & Paschim Bardhaman districts. SH 14 connects the place with Panagarh in Paschim Bardhaman and Moregram in Murshidabad district. The Dubrajpur Railway Station under Asansol division of Eastern Railways provides connectivity with Kolkata, Andal, Durgapur, Asansol, Sainthia, Rampurhat, Malda and many other major stations.

=== Mama Bhagne ===
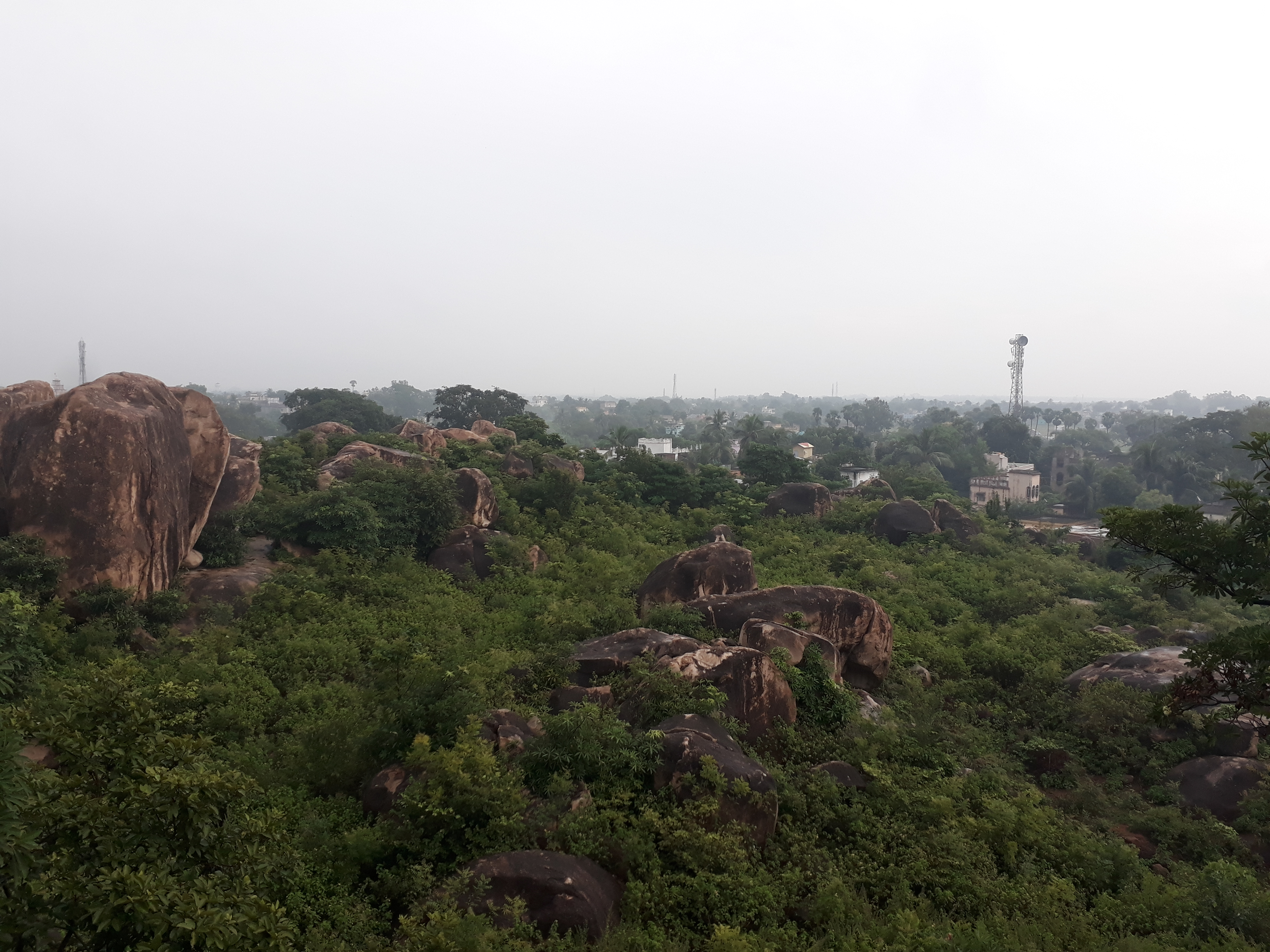
View of Dubrajpur town from Mama Bhagne Hills

Near Dubrajpur town there is a hill named Mama Bhagne. A large number of large sized rocks are found in the area. Two remarkable pieces of these rocks were known as Mama and Bhagne (maternal uncle and nephew). Subsequently, the entire area came to be known as Mama Bhagne. Mama Bhagne pahar (hill) is now a picnic and tourist spot.

== Demographics ==
As of 2001 India census, Dubrajpur had a population of 32,752. Males constitute 52% of the population and females 48%. Dubrajpur has an average literacy rate of 56%, lower than the national average of 59.5%: male literacy is 65% and, female literacy is 46%. In Dubrajpur, 14% of the population is under 6 years of age.

== Mythology ==
It is believed that when Rama decided to attack Ravana, he found it necessary to throw a bridge across the straits for the conveyance of his troops, he drove in his aerial chariot to the Himalayas, picked up what stones he needed and drove back. As he was passing Dubrajpur his horses took fright and tilted up the chariot and so some stones fell out. These are the stones at Mama Bhagne.

There is another legend to the effect that they were collected by Viswakarma, at the command of Shiva, to erect in one night a second Kasi. When he collected the rocks and was about to commence work, day dawned, so he left.

== See also ==
- Dubrajpur (community development block)
- Dubrajpur Assembly constituency
