= Suri Sadar subdivision =

- Subdivision
- Interactive map of Suri Sadar subdivision
- Coordinates: 23.92°N 87.53°E
- Country: India
- State: West Bengal
- District: Birbhum
- Headquarters: Suri

Languages
  - Official: Bengali, English
- Time zone: UTC+5:30 (IST)
- ISO 3166 code: ISO 3166-2:IN
- Vehicle registration: WB
- Website: wb.gov.in

Suri Sadar subdivision is an administrative subdivision of Birbhum district in the state of West Bengal, India.

== Overview ==
Starting in its northern parts with the Brahmani-Mayurakshi Basin, a sub-micro physiographic region occupying the area between the Brahmani in the north and the Mayurakshi in the south, Suri Sadar subdivision merges with the Suri-Bolpur Plain, another sub-micro physiographic region that covers the interfluves of the Mayurakshi and the Ajay. The plain area exhibits somewhat upland topography sloping from north-west to south-east. The western part of the subdivision forms the Bakreswar Uplands, an extension of the plateau region of Santhal Parganas. The undulating area rises to high ridges on the western boundary with Jharkhand.

== Geography ==
=== Subdivisions ===
Birbhum district is divided into the following administrative subdivisions:

Subdivision	Headquarters	Area km^{2} (2001)	Population (2011)	Rural population % (2011)	Urban population % (2011)
Rampurhat	Rampurhat	1,574.23	1,508,506	96.62	3.38
Suri Sadar	Suri	1,782.72	1,121,871	96.57	3.43
Bolpur	Bolpur	1,186.66	872,027	96.56	3.44
Birbhum district		4,545.00	3,502,404	96.59	3.41

=== Administrative units ===
Suri Sadar subdivision has 9 police stations, 7 community development blocks, 7 panchayat samitis, 62 gram panchayats, 1092 mouzas, 951 inhabited villages, 3 municipalities and 5 census towns. The municipalities are: Suri, Sainthia and Dubrajpur. The census towns are: Karidhya, Kalipur, Ahmedpur, Tantipara and Rajnagar. The subdivision has its headquarters at Suri.

=== Police stations ===
Police stations in Suri Sadar subdivision have the following features and jurisdiction:

Police station	Area covered km^{2}	Municipal town	CD Block
Mohammad Bazar	313.4	-	Mohammad Bazar
Sainthia	311.1	Sainthia	Sainthia
Dubrajpur	359.5	Dubrajpur	Dubrajpur
Lokpur	n/a	n/a	n/a
Chandrapur	n/a	n/a	n/a
Rajnagar	220.7	-	Rajnagar
Suri	292.9	Suri	-
Suri Women	n/a	n/a	n/a
Sadaipur	n/a	-	Suri I
Panrui	n/a	-	Suri II
Khoyrasol	273.55	-	Khoyrasol
Kankartala	n/a	-	Khoyrasol

=== Blocks ===
Community development blocks in Suri Sadar subdivision are:

CD Block	Headquarters	Area km^{2} (2001)	Population (2011)	SC %	ST %	Hindus %	Muslims %	Literacy rate %	Census Towns
Mohammad Bazar	Angar Garia	315.64	164,570	26.62	18.93	67.15	31.29	65.18	-
Rajnagar	Rajnagar	221.47	77,979	34.91	15.97	84.74	14.27	68.10	1
Suri I	Karidhya	154.65	111,377	35.94	8.83	73.05	26.59	72.75	2
Suri II	Purandarpur	135.81	87,405	32.78	13.37	67.70	31.59	72.75	-
Sainthia	Ahmedpur	304.39	195,349	35.25	12.30	77.68	21.46	72.33	1
Dubrajpur	Dubrajpur	344.88	181,437	34.66	5.44	66.52	33.22	68.26	-
Khoyrasol	Khoyrasol	272.19	153,248	35.55	1.79	75.71	24.30	68.75	-

=== Gram panchayats ===
The subdivision contains 62 gram panchayats under 7 community development blocks:

- Suri I block consists of seven gram panchayats, viz. Alunda, Karidhya, Mallickpur, Tilpara, Bhurkuna, Khatanga and Nagari.
- Suri II block consists of six gram panchayats, viz. Abinashpur, Domdama, Koma, Banshanka, Kendua and Purandarpur.
- Sainthia block consists of 12 gram panchayats, viz. Ahmadpur, Banagram, Horisara, Panrui, Bhromorkol, Deriapur, Hatora, Sangra, Amarpur, Fulur, Mathpalsa and Sreenidhipur.
- Dubrajpur block consists of ten gram panchayats, viz. Balijuri, Hetampur, Loba, Sahapur, Chinpai, Jashpur, Paduma, Gohaliara, Laxmi-Narayanpur and Parulia.
- Khayrashol block consists of ten gram panchayats, viz. Babuijore, Kendgore, Nakrakonda, Rupuspur, Barrah, Khoyrasole, Panchra, Hazratpur, Lokepur and Parsundi.
- Rajnagar block consists of five gram panchayats, viz. Bhabanipur, Gangmuri-Joypur, Tantipara, Chandrapur and Rajnagar.
- Mahammad Bazar block consists of 12 gram panchayats, viz. Angargaria, Charicha, Hinglow, Puranagram, Bharkata, Deucha, Kapista, Rampur, Bhutura, Gonpur, Mahamadbazar and Sekedda.

== Education ==
Birbhum district had a literacy rate of 70.68% as per the provisional figures of the census of India 2011. Rampurhat subdivision had a literacy rate of 69.12%, Suri Sadar subdivision 71.16% and Bolpur subdivision 72.71%.

Given in the table below (data in numbers) is a comprehensive picture of the education scenario in Birbhum district, with data for the year 2013-14:

Subdivision	Primary School		Middle School		High School		Higher Secondary School		General College, Univ		Technical / Professional Instt		Non-formal Education	
Subdivision	Institution	Student	Institution	Student	Institution	Student	Institution	Student	Institution	Student	Institution	Student	Institution	Student
Rampurhat	889	99,767	132	9,487	82	68,462	65	85,685	7	16,963	24	3,448	2,291	99,407
Suri Sadar	912	71,882	90	5,188	72	40,161	56	69,109	6	13,912	35	7,620	1,961	58,469
Bolpur	628	48,314	64	5,859	53	31,266	49	60,139	6	17,379	20	3,424	1,333	43,805
Birbhum district	2,429	219,263	286	20,534	207	139,889	170	214,925	19	48,254	79	14,492	5,585	201,681

The following institutions are located in Suri Sadar subdivision:

- Suri Vidyasagar College was established at Suri in 1942.
- Birbhum Mahavidyalaya was established at Suri in 1979
- Birbhum Institute of Engineering & Technology, an AICTE approved engineering college, was established at Suri in 1999.
- Krishna Chandra College was established at Hetampur in 1896.
- Abhedananda Mahavidyalaya was established at Sainthia in 1965.
- Rajnagar Mahavidyalaya was established at Rajnagar in 2009.
- Sailajananda Falguni Smriti Mahavidyalaya was established at Khoyrasol in 1998.
- Basantika Institute of Engineering and Technology (Polytechnic) at Gonpur offers diploma courses in engineering.

== Healthcare ==
Medical facilities in Suri Sadar subdivision are as follows:

Hospitals: (Name, location, beds)

- Birbhum District Hospital, Suri, 525 beds
- Birbhum Jail Hospital, Suri, 72 beds
- Birbhum Police Hospital, Suri, 20 beds
- Niramoy TB Sanatorium, Giridanga (Dubrajpur), 300 beds
- Massanjore Irrigation Hospital, Massanjore (Dumka), 2 beds

(Physically outside the subdivision but administratively under it)

State General Hospitals: (Name, location, beds)

- Sainthia State General Hospital, College Road, Sainthia, 100 beds

Rural Hospitals: (Name, CD Block, location, beds)

- Mohammad Bazar Rural Hospital, Mohammad Bazar CD Block, PO Pattelnagar, 30 beds
- Rajnagar Rural Hospital, Rajnagar CD Block, Rajnagar, 30 beds
- Sultanpur Rural Hospital, Suri II CD Block, PO Abinashpur, 30 beds
- Dubrajpur Rural Hospital, Dubrajpur CD Block, PO Hetampur Rajbati, 30 beds
- Nakrakonda Rural Hospital, Khoyrasol CD Block, Nakrakonda, 30 beds

Block Primary Health Centres: (Name, CD Block, location, beds)

- Barachaturi Block Primary Health Centre, Suri I CD Block, PO Khatanga, 15 beds

Primary Health Centres: (CD Block-wise)(CD Block, PHC location, beds)

- Mohammad Bazar CD Block: Bharkata (10), Puranogram (6), Rampur (10), Sakeddah (PO Dighalgram) (6)
- Rajnagar CD Block: Bhabanipur (6), Tantipara (10)
- Suri I CD Block: Kachujore (PO Mhubuna) (10), Chakdaha (6)
- uri II CD Block: Purandarpur (10), Patanda (PO Ikra) (6)
- Sainthia CD Block: Amarpur (PO Gargaria) (10), Bharmarkole (PO Kachuihata) (10), Sangra (PO Chhotosangra) (10) Srinidhipur (PO Purbasiur) (6) and Iswarpur (PO Ahmedpur) (10)
- Dubrajpur CD Block: Balijuri (10), Jashpur (PO Ghoratore) (6), Jatra (6), Bakreshwar (6)
- Khoyrasol CD Block: Barrah (10), Panchra (PO Panchrahat) (6), Lokpur (6)

== Electoral constituencies ==
Lok Sabha (parliamentary) and Vidhan Sabha (state assembly) constituencies in Suri Sadar subdivision were as follows:

Lok Sabha constituency	Reservation	Vidhan Sabha constituency	Reservation	CD Block and/or Gram panchayats and/or municipal areas
Birbhum	None	Rampurhat	None	Rampurhat munuicipality, Rampurhat I CD Block and Bharkata, Gonpur, Hinglow, Kapista, Rampur and Sekedda GPs of Mohammad Bazar CD Block
-	-	Sainthia	SC	Sainthia municipality, Banagram, Deriapur, Fulur, Horisara, Hatora and Mathpalsa GPs of Sainthia CD Block, Angar Garia, Bhutura, Charicha, Mohammad Bazar, Deucha and Puranagram GPs of Mohammad Bazar CD Block, and Suri II CD Block
-	-	Suri	None	Suri municipality, Suri I, Rajnagar CD Block, and Chinpai, Gohaliara, Parulia and Sahapur GPs of Dubrajpur CD Block
-	-	Dubrajpur	SC	Dubrajpur municipality, Balijuri, Hetampur, Jashpur, Laxmi Narayanpur, Loba and Paduma GPs of Dubrajpur CD Block and Khoyrasol CD Block
-	-	All other Vidhan Sabha segments outside Suri Sadar subdivision	-	
Bolpur	SC	Labpur	None	Labpur CD Block, and Ahmedpur, Amarpur, Bhromorkol, Panrui, Sangra and Sreenidhipur GPs of Sainthia CD Block
-	-	All other Vidhan Sabha segments outside Suri Sadar subdivision	-	
