= Lokpur =

Lokepur
- Village
- Location in West Bengal, India
- Coordinates: 23.8694°N 87.2845°E
- Country: India
- State: West Bengal
- District: Birbhum

Population (2011)
  - Total: 4,018

Languages
  - Official: Bengali, English
- Time zone: UTC+5:30 (IST)
- PIN: 731123 (Lokepur)
- Telephone/STD code: 03462
- Lok Sabha constituency: Birbhum
- Vidhan Sabha constituency: Dubrajpur
- Website: birbhum.nic.in

Lokpur (also spelled Lokepur) is a village and gram panchayat in Khoyrasol CD Block in Suri Sadar subdivision of Birbhum district in the Indian state of West Bengal.

== Geography ==
Cities and towns in Suri Sadar subdivision of Birbhum district
M: municipal city/ town, CT: census town, R: rural/ urban centre, B: Barrage.
Owing to space constraints in the small map, the actual locations in a larger map may vary slightly

=== Police station ===
There is a police station at Lokpur.

== Demographics ==
As per the 2011 Census of India, Lokpur had a total population of 4,018 of which 2,022 (50%) were males and 1,996 (50%) were females. Population below 6 years was 433. The total number of literates in Lokpur was 2,614 (72.91% of the population over 6 years).

== Transport ==
Khoyrasol-Lokpur Road links it to Khoyrasol and Lokpur-Rajnagar Road links it to Rajnagar.

== Post Office ==
Lokpur has a delivery branch post office, with PIN 731123, under Dubrajpur sub office and Suri head office. Dubrajpur has the same PIN. Branch offices with the same PIN are Bakreswar, Balijuri, Jangaldubrajpur, Joplai, Kukutia, Lakshminarayanpur, Metela, Panditpur, Peruagopalpur and Rupaspur.

== Culture ==
Lokpur Agrani Rural Library, a government-sponsored library, was established in 1958. It has its own pucca building.

== Healthcare ==
There is a primary health centre with six beds at Lokpur.
