= Babuijore =

- Village
- Location in West Bengal, India Babuijore (India)
- Coordinates: 23.8405°N 87.1785°E
- Country: India
- State: West Bengal
- District: Birbhum

Population (2011)
  - Total: 3,038

Languages
  - Official: Bengali, English
- Time zone: UTC+5:30 (IST)
- PIN: 731125
- Telephone/STD code: 91 03462
- ISO 3166 code: IN-WB
- Website: birbhum.nic.in

Babuijore is a village and gram panchayat in Khoyrasol CD Block in Suri Sadar subdivision of Birbhum, West Bengal, India.

== Geography ==
=== Location ===
Khoyrasol, the CD Block headquarters, is 16 km away from Babuijore and Dubrajpur, the nearest town, is 10 km away. Suri, headquarters of the district, is 51 km away.

=== Gram panchayat ===
Villages in Babuijore gram panchayat are: Babuijore, Bansyaer, Bataspur, Dhulkomra, Gharakuri, Geruapahari, Hanulia, Hariektala, Ilamkuri, Kanakpukur, Kese, Khalajuri, Madanpur, Mahuribasa, Manjuria, Palashbhumi, Penchalia, Shrirampur and Tishur.

== Demographics ==
As per the 2011 Census of India, Babuijor had a total population of 3,038 of which 1,596 (53%) were males and 1,442 (47%) were females. Population below 6 years was 333. The total number of literates in Babuijor was 1,908 (70.54% of the population over 6 years).

== Post Office ==
Babuijore has a delivery branch post office, with PIN 731125, under Khoyrasol sub office and Suri head office. Khoyrasol sub office has the same PIN. Branch offices with the same PIN are Barhara, Bhadulia, Geruapahari, Hazratpur, Jahidpur, Kankartala, Kendragoria, Nabasan, Nakrakonda, Pursundi, Rasa and Sagarbhanga.
