= Monirul Islam (politician) =

West Bengal politician

Member of West Bengal Legislative Assembly
- In office 2011–2021
- Preceded by: Nabanita Mukherjee
- Succeeded by: Abhijit Sinha
- Constituency: Labpur

Personal details
- Born: 1960 (age 65–66) Birbhum district, West Bengal
- Party: Trinamool Congress

Monirul Islam (born 1960) was an Indian farmer, social worker and politician belonging to the Trinamool Congress. He served as a member of the West Bengal Legislative Assembly for a decade.

== Early life and family ==
Monirul Islam was born in 1960 to a Bengali Muslim family in the Birbhum district of West Bengal. He was the son of Ahasan Ahamad and obtained his Higher Secondary Certificate from the Ramnagar Sahora Union High School in 1976.

== Career ==
Islam contested in the 2011 West Bengal Legislative Assembly election where he ran as a Trinamool Congress candidate for Labpur Assembly constituency, defeating former MLA and Marxist politician Nabanita Mukherjee. He contested in the 2016 West Bengal Legislative Assembly election and was re-elected to Labpur after winning against Marxist candidate Syed Mahfuzul Karim. Islam contested in the 2021 West Bengal Legislative Assembly election on an independent ticket but was unsuccessful.
