= Debasis Ojha =

Indian politician (born 1968)

Member of the West Bengal Legislative Assembly
- Incumbent
- Assumed office 2026
- Preceded by: Abhijit Sinha
- Constituency: Labpur
- Majority: 3,550

Personal details
- Born: 1968 (age 57–58) India
- Occupation: Politician; businessman

Debasis Ojha (born 1968) is an Indian politician from West Bengal. He is a member of West Bengal Legislative Assembly from Labpur Assembly constituency in Birbhum district representing the Bharatiya Janata Party.

== Early life ==
Ojha is from Labpur, Birbhum district, Wes Bengal. He is the son of the late Sanjib Kumar Ojha. He passed Class 8 and appeared for Madhyamik exams conducted by the West Bengal Board of Secondary Education in 1985. He runs his own business. He declared assets worth Rs.1 crore in his affidavit to the Election Commission of India.

== Career ==
Ojha won the Labpur Assembly constituency representing the Bharatiya Janata Party in the 2026 West Bengal Legislative Assembly election. He polled 1,06,402 votes and defeated his nearest rival, Abhijit Sinha of the All India Trinamool Congress, by a margin of 3,550 votes.
