= Nakrakonda =

- Village
- Location in West Bengal, India
- Coordinates: 23.8091°N 87.2586°E
- Country: India
- State: West Bengal
- District: Birbhum

Population (2011)
  - Total: 2,683

Languages
  - Official: Bengali, English
- Time zone: UTC+5:30 (IST)
- PIN: 731125 (Nakrakonda)
- Telephone/STD code: 03462
- Lok Sabha constituency: Birbhum
- Vidhan Sabha constituency: Dubrajpur
- Website: birbhum.nic.in

Nakrakonda (also spelled Nakraconda) is a village and gram panchayat in Khoyrasol CD Block in Suri Sadar subdivision of Birbhum district in the Indian state of West Bengal.

== Geography ==
Cities and towns in Suri Sadar subdivision of Birbhum district
M: municipal city/ town, CT: census town, R: rural/ urban centre, B: Barrage.
Owing to space constraints in the small map, the actual locations in a larger map may vary slightly

=== Location ===
Khoyrasol, the CD Block headquarters, is 1.2 km away from Nakrakonda and Dubrajpur, the nearest town, is 10 km away. Suri, headquarters of the district, is 36 km away.

=== Gram panchayat ===
Villages in Nakrakanda gram panchayat are: Ahmadpur, Bastabpur, Bhadulia, Bhurjora, Birjuri, Gangarampur, Gangpur, Kharikabad, Naopara, Nakrakanda, Paschim Sibpur, Puratan Nagrakonda, Sagarbhanga, Sahebpur, Shermara, Shilabatpur and Uttar Hazaratpur.

== Demographics ==
As per the 2011 Census of India, Naxrakanda had a total population of 2,683 of which 1,357 (51%) were males and 1,326 (49%) were females. Population below 6 years was 345. The total number of literates in Naxrakanda was 1,723 (73.70% of the population over 6 years). There is a 400 year old Zamindari complex with unique caricature from those times. The complex is still partially inhabited by the descendants. A new wing has been built over years. There is a 400 year Old Durga temple complex which has broken apart and the festivities have shifted to a new temple beside it. The Zamindari complex and the beautiful sculptures and etchings provide a strong tourist attraction.

== Post Office ==
Nakrakonda has a delivery branch post office, with PIN 731125, under Khoyrasol sub office and Suri head office. Khoyrasol sub office has the same PIN. Branch offices with the same PIN are Babuijore, Barhara, Bhadulia, Geruapahari, Hazratpur, Jahidpur, Kankartala, Kendragoria, Nabasan, Pursundi, Rasa and Sagarbhanga.

== Education ==
Nakraconda High School, a co-educational higher secondary institution, has arrangements for teaching the following subjects: accountancy, Bengali, bio science, business economics & mathematics, chemistry, eco-geography, English, history, mathematics, philosophy, Physics and political science.

== Culture ==
Nakrakonda Falguni Pathagar, a government-sponsored library, was established in 1978. It has its own pucca building.

== Healthcare ==
Nakrakonda Rural Hospital with 30 beds is the main medical facility in the Khoyrasol CD Block. There are primary health centres at Barrah (10 beds), Panchra (PO Panchrahat) (6 beds) and Lokepur (6 beds).
