= Bhimnagar =

Bhimnagar may refer to

- Bhimnagar, Supaul, near India-Nepal border in Bihar
- Bhimnagar district, Uttar Pradesh

== See also ==
- Bhimgarh, West Bengal
- Bhimgarh Fort, near Reasi in Jammu and Kashmir
