= Khoyrasol (community development block) =

Khayrasole
- Community development block
- Location in West Bengal
- Coordinates: 23°47′24″N 87°16′14″E
- Country: India
- State: West Bengal
- District: Birbhum
- Parliamentary constituency: Birbhum
- Assembly constituency: Dubrajpur

Area
  - Total: 272.19 km^{2} (105.09 sq mi)

Population (2011)
  - Total: 153,248
  - Density: 563.02/km^{2} (1,458.2/sq mi)
- Time zone: UTC+5.30 (IST)
- PIN: 731125
- Literacy Rate: 68.75 per cent
- Website: http://birbhum.nic.in/

Khayrasol (also spelt Khoyrasole, Khayrashol, Khayrasol, Khayrashoal) is a community development block that forms an administrative division in Suri Sadar subdivision of Birbhum district in the Indian state of West Bengal.

== Overview ==
Birbhum district is physiographically a part of the ancient Rarh region. The western portion of the district is basically an extension of the Chota Nagpur Plateau. The area has mostly loose reddish lateritic low fertility soil. In the east, the flood plains of the major rivers, such as the Ajay, Bakreshwar, Mayurakshi and Brahmani, have soft alluvial soil. The forest cover is only 3.5% of the total district. Although coal is found in the district and Bakreshwar Thermal Power Station has a capacity of 2,010 MW, the economic condition of Birbhum is dominated by agriculture. From 1977 onwards majorland reforms took place in West Bengal. Land in excess of land ceiling was acquired and distributed amongst the peasants. In Birbhum district, 19,968 hectares of vested agricultural land has been distributed amongst 161,515 beneficiaries, till 2011. However, more than 38% of the operational land holding is marginal or less than 1 acre. The proportion of agricultural labourers amongst total workers in Birbhum district is 45.9%, the highest amongst all districts of West Bengal. Culturally rich Birbhum, with such traditional landmarks as Jaydev Kenduli and Chandidas Nanoor, is home to Visva-Bharati University at Santiniketan, having close association with two Nobel laureates – Rabindranath Tagore and Amartya Sen.

== Geography ==
Map of Birbhum district showing CD blocks and municipal areas. Click on the map to view larger map.

Khoyrasol is located at 23°47′24″N 87°16′14″E.

Khoyrasol CD Block is part of the Bakreshwar Upland, one of the four sub-micro physiographic regions occupying the western portion of the district. This area is a heavily dissected extension of the plateau region of Santhal Parganas. The undulating area rises to high ridges on the western boundary with Jharkhand.

Hinglo Dam across the Hinglo has a capacity of 17,102,000 cubic metres (13,865 acre⋅ft),

Khoyrasol CD Block is bounded by Rajnagar CD Block on the north, Dubrajpur CD Block on the east, Jamuria CD Block, in Paschim Bardhaman district, across the Ajay on the south and Nala and Kundhit CD Blocks, in Jamtara district of Jharkhand on the west.

Khoyrasol CD Block has an area of 272.19 km^{2}. It has 1 panchayat samity, 10 gram panchayats, 83 gram sansads (village councils), 170 mouzas and 126 inhabited villages, as per District Statistical Handbook 2008. Khoyrasol and Kankartala police stations serve this block. Headquarters of this CD Block is at Khoyrasol.

Gram panchayats of Khoyrasol block/panchayat samiti are: Babuijore, Barrah, Hazaratpur, Kendgare, Khoyrasol, Lokpur, Nakrakonda, Panchra, Parsundi and Rupuspur.

== Demographics ==
=== Population ===
As per the 2011 Census of India, Khoyrasol CD Block had a total population of 153,248, all of which were rural. There were 79,118 (52%) males and 74,130 (48%) females. Population below 6 years was 10,649. Scheduled Castes numbered 54,476 (35.55%) and Scheduled Tribes numbered 2,740 (1.79%).

As per 2001 census, Khoyrasole block had a total population of 135,239, out of which 69,884 were males and 65,335 were females. Khoyrasole block registered a population growth of 10.78 per cent during the 1991-2001 decade. Decadal growth for Birbhum district was 17.88 per cent. Decadal growth in West Bengal was 17.84 per cent.

Large villages (with 4,000+ population) in Khoyrasol CD Block are (2011 census figures in brackets): Lokpur (4,018), Barra (10,798) and Rasa (4,037).

Other villages in Khoyrasol CD Block include (2011 census figures in brackets): Khoyrasol (3,313), Babuijore (3,038), Panchra (3,412), Bhimgara (2,068), Kendgara (2,110), Rupaspur (1,232) and Naxrakandra (2,683).

=== Literacy ===
As per the 2011 census the total number of literates in Khoyrasol CD Block was 91,848 (68.75% of the population over 6 years) out of which males numbered 53,628 (77.77% of the male population over 6 years) and females numbered 38,220 (59.13% of the female population over 6 years). The gender disparity (the difference between female and male literacy rates) was 18.64%.

See also – List of West Bengal districts ranked by literacy rate

Literacy in CD blocks of
Birbhum district
Rampurhat subdivision
Murarai I – 55.67%
Murarai II – 58.28%
Nalhati I – 69.83%
Nalhati II – 71.68%
Rampurhat I – 73.29%
Rampurhat II – 70.77%
Mayureswar I – 71.52%
Mayureswar II – 70.89%
Suri Sadar subdivision
Mohammad Bazar – 65.18%
Rajnagar – 68.10%
Suri I – 72.75%
Suri II – 72.75%
Sainthia – 72.33%
Dubrajpur – 68.26%
Khoyrasol – 68.75%
Bolpur subdivision
Bolpur Sriniketan – 70.67%
Ilambazar – 74.27%
Labpur – 71.20%
Nanoor – 69.45%
2011 Census: CD Block Wise

Primary Census Abstract Data

=== Language and religion ===
Religion in Khoyrasol CD block (2011)
Hinduism	75.51%
Islam	24.30%
Other or not stated	0.19%

In the 2011 census, Hindus numbered 115,710 and formed 75.51% of the population in Khoyrasol CD Block. Muslims numbered 37,237 and formed 24.30% of the population. Christians numbered 124 and formed 0.08% of the population. Others numbered 177 and formed 0.12% of the population.

The proportion of Hindus in Birbhum district has declined from 72.2% in 1961 to 62.3% in 2011. The proportion of Muslims in Birbhum district has increased from 27.6% to 37.1% during the same period. Christians formed 0.3% in 2011.

Languages in Khoyrasol CD block (2011)
1. Bengali (97.9%)
2. Santali (1.46%)
3. Others (0.65%)

At the time of the 2011 census, 97.89% of the population spoke Bengali and 1.46% Santali as their first language.

== Rural poverty ==
As per the BPL household survey carried out in 2005, the proportion of BPL households in Khoyrasol CD Block was 36.9%, against 42.3% in Birbhum district. In six CD Blocks – Murarai II, Nalhati II, Rampurhat II, Rampurhat I, Suri II and Murarai I – the proportion of BPL families was more than 50%. In three CD Blocks – Rajnagar, Suri I and Labhpur – the proportion of BPL families was less than 30%. The other ten CD Blocks in Birbhum district were placed in between. According to the District Human Development Report, Birbhum, "Although there is no indication that the share of BPL households is more in blocks with higher share of agricultural labourer, there is a clear pattern that the share of BPL households is more in blocks with disadvantaged population in general and Muslim population in particular." (The disadvantaged population includes SCs, STs and Muslims.)

== Economy ==
=== Livelihood ===
Livelihood
in Khoyrasol CD Block
1. Cultivators (21.4%)
2. Agricultural labourers (44.7%)
3. Household industries (3.57%)
4. Other Workers (30.3%)

In Khoyrasol CD Block in 2011, amongst the class of total workers, cultivators numbered 11,475 and formed 21.44%, agricultural labourers numbered 23,909 and formed 44.67%, household industry workers numbered 1,909 and formed 3.57% and other workers numbered 16,231 and formed 30.32%. Total workers numbered 53,524 and formed 34.93% of the total population, and non-workers numbered 99,724 and formed 65.07% of the population.

Note: In the census records a person is considered a cultivator, if the person is engaged in cultivation/ supervision of land owned by self/government/institution. When a person who works on another person's land for wages in cash or kind or share, is regarded as an agricultural labourer. Household industry is defined as an industry conducted by one or more members of the family within the household or village, and one that does not qualify for registration as a factory under the Factories Act. Other workers are persons engaged in some economic activity other than cultivators, agricultural labourers and household workers. It includes factory, mining, plantation, transport and office workers, those engaged in business and commerce, teacher s, entertainment artistes and so on.

=== Infrastructure ===
There are 130 inhabited villages in Khoyrasol CD Block, as per District Census Handbook, Birbhum, 2011. 100% villages have power supply. 124 villages (95.38%) have drinking water supply. 26 villages (20.00%) have post offices. 122 villages (93.85%) have telephones (including landlines, public call offices and mobile phones). 43 villages (33.08%) have pucca (paved) approach roads and 68 villages (52.13%) have transport communication (includes bus service, rail facility and navigable waterways). 3 villages (2.31%) have agricultural credit societies and 5 villages (3.85%) have banks.

=== Agriculture ===
Following land reforms land ownership pattern has undergone transformation. In 2004-05 (the agricultural labourer data is for 2001), persons engaged in agriculture in Khoyrasol CD Block could be classified as follows: bargadars 13,304 (25.61%), patta (document) holders 7,657 (14.74%), small farmers (possessing land between 1 and 2 hectares) 404 (0.78%), marginal farmers (possessing land up to 1 hectare) 14,330 (27.59%) and agricultural labourers 16,252 (31.29%).

Birbhum is a predominantly paddy cultivation-based agricultural district. The area under paddy cultivation in 2010-11 was 249,000 hectares of land. Paddy is grown in do, suna and sali classes of land. There is double to triple cropping system for paddy cultivation. Other crops grown in Birbhum are gram, masuri, peas, wheat, linseed, khesari, til, sugarcane and occasionally cotton. 192,470 hectares of cultivable land is under irrigation by different sources, such as canals, tanks, river lift irrigation and different types of tubewells. In 2009–10, 158,380 hectares were irrigated by canal water. There are such major irrigation projects as Mayurakshi and Hijli. Other rivers such as Ajoy, Brahmani, Kuskurni, Dwaraka, Hingla and Kopai are also helpful for irrigation in the district.

In 2013–14, there were 41 fertiliser depots, 6 seed stores and 50 fair price shops in Khoyrasol CD block.

In 2013–14, Khoyrasol CD block produced 3,307 tonnes of Aman paddy, the main winter crop, from 1,597 hectares, 31 tonnes of Boro paddy (spring crop) from 9 hectares, 4,308 tonnes of wheat from 1,809 hectares and 27,690 tonnes of potatoes from 935 hectares. It also produced pulses and oilseeds.

In 2013–14, the total area irrigated in Khoyrasol CD block was 5,367 hectares, out of which 2,500 hectares were irrigated by canal water, 1,310 hectares by tank water, 50 hectares by river lift irrigation, 72 hectares by deep tube wells, 1,064 hectares by shallow tube wells, 350 hectares by open dug wells and 11 hectares by other means.

=== Banking ===
In 2013–14, Khoyrasol CD block had offices of 5 commercial banks and 4 gramin banks.

== Coal ==
Palasthali Open Cast Project is under Pandaveswar Area of Eastern Coalfields.

=== Other sectors ===
According to the District Human Development Report, 2009, Birbhum is one of the most backward districts of West Bengal in terms of industrial development. Of the new industrial projects set-up in West Bengal between 1991 and 2005, only 1.23% came to Birbhum. Bakreshwar Thermal Power Station is the only large-scale industry in the district and employs about 5,000 people. There are 4 medium-scale industries and 4,748 registered small-scale industries.

The proportion of workers engaged in agriculture in Birbhum has been decreasing. According to the District Human Development Report, "more people are now engaged in non-agricultural activities, such as fishing, retail sales, vegetable vending, selling milk, and so on. As all these activities are at the lower end of the spectrum of marketable skills, it remains doubtful if these activities generate enough return for their family’s sustenance."

=== Backward Regions Grant Fund ===
Birbhum district is listed as a backward region and receives financial support from the Backward Regions Grant Fund. The fund, created by the Government of India, is designed to redress regional imbalances in development. As of 2012, 272 districts across the country were listed under this scheme. The list includes 11 districts of West Bengal.

== Transport ==
Khoyrasol CD block has 12 originating/ terminating bus routes.

The Andal-Sainthia branch line passes through this block. There are stations at Bhimgara Junction and Panchra railway station. As of 2018, the Bhimgara-Palasthali line has remained in-operative.

NH 14, running from Morgram (in Murshidabad district) to Kharagpur (in Paschim Medinipur district) passes through this block.

== Education ==
In 2013–14, Khoyrasol CD block had 122 primary schools with 9,408 students, 10 middle schools with 945 students, 11 high schools with 5,643 students and 8 higher secondary schools with 8,445 students. Khoyrasol CD Block had 1 general degree college with 1,281 students and 246 institutions for special and non-formal education with 8,230 students.

As per the 2011 census, in Khoyrasol CD Block, amongst the 130 inhabited villages, 11 villages did not have a school, 39 villages had more than 1 primary school, 35 villages had at least 1 primary and 1 middle school and 23 villages had at least 1 middle and 1 secondary school. 15 villages had senior secondary schools.

Sailajananda Falguni Smriti Mahavidyalaya was established at Khoyrasol in 1998.

== Healthcare ==
In 2014, Khoyrasol CD block had 1 block primary health centre and 3 primary health centres with total 37 beds and 4 doctors (excluding private bodies). It had 24 family welfare subcentres. 1,190 patients were treated indoor and 48,463 patients were treated outdoor in the hospitals, health centres and subcentres of the CD block.

As per 2011 census, in Khoyrasol CD Block, 3 villages had community health centres, 4 villages had primary health centres, 29 villages had primary health subcentres, 1 village had a maternity and child welfare centre, 2 villages had veterinary hospitals, 14 villages had medicine shops and out of the 130 inhabited villages 83 villages had no medical facilities.

Nakrakonda Rural Hospital at Nakrakonda has 30 beds. There are primary health centres at Barrah (10 beds), Panchra (PO Panchrahat) (6 beds) and Lokpur (6 beds).
