= Chandrapur, Birbhum =

Chandrapur
- Village
- Location in West Bengal, India
- Coordinates: 23.928212°N 87.384867°E
- Country: India
- State: West Bengal
- District: Birbhum

Population (2011)
  - Total: 2,012

Languages
  - Official: Bengali, English
- Time zone: UTC+5:30 (IST)
- PIN: 731130 (Chandrapur)
- Telephone/STD code: 03462
- Lok Sabha constituency: Birbhum
- Vidhan Sabha constituency: Suri
- Website: birbhum.nic.in

Chandrapur is a village and gram panchayat in Rajnagar CD Block in Suri Sadar subdivision of Birbhum district in the Indian state of West Bengal.

== Geography ==
Cities and towns in Suri Sadar subdivision of Birbhum district
M: municipal city/ town, CT: census town, R: rural/ urban centre, B: Barrage.
Owing to space constraints in the small map, the actual locations in a larger map may vary slightly

=== Location ===
Rajnagar, the CD block headquarters, is 11 km away from Chandrapur. Suri, the district headquarters, is 15 km away.

=== Police station ===
There is a police station at Chandrapur. this police station two gram panchyat consists of tantipara & Chandrapur .tantipara this under big census town & township locality in block

=== Gram panchayat ===
Villages in Chandrapur gram panchayat are: Baishnabdaspur, Balarampur, Baraghata, Bhabanandapur, Chaktulsi, Chandrapur, Daldala, Durgapur, Fakirdas, Faridpur, Gamarkunda, Ganeshpur, Haripur, Jamira, Kanaipur, Kanchannagar, Kusmasul, Madhaipur, Monoharpur, Pataldanga, Rajpur, Sajina, Takipur and Tarasol.

== Demographics ==
As per the 2011 Census of India, Chandrapur had a total population of 2,012 of which 1,033 (51%) were males and 979 (49%) were females. Population below 6 years was 211. The total number of literates in Chandrapur was 1,363 (75.68% of the population over 6 years).

== Transport ==
SH 6, running from Rajnagar to Alampur, passes through Chandrapur.

== Post Office ==
Chandrapur has a delivery sub post office, with PIN 731130, under Suri head office. Branch offices with the same PIN are Aligarh, Joypur, Kundira, Kurulmetia, Lauberia, Laujore, Muktipur and Ranigram.
