= Gonpur =

Village in west Bengal India

Gonpur Ganpur
- Village
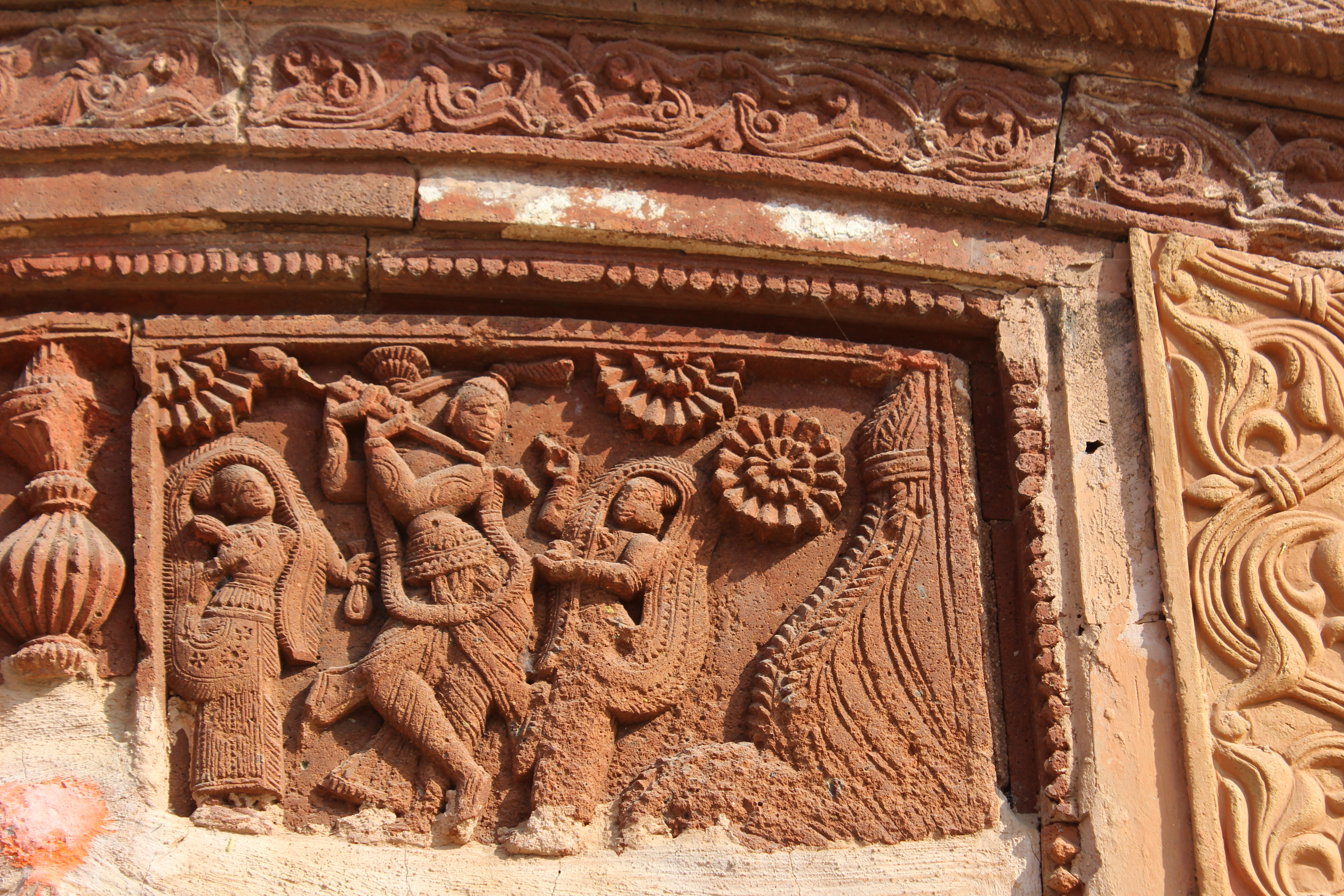
- Rameswar Shiva temple complex - terracota carving

- Location in West Bengal, India Gonpur (India)
- Coordinates: 24.0676°N 87.6742°E
- Country: India
- State: West Bengal
- District: Birbhum

Population (2011)
  - Total: 2,706

Official Languages
  - Languages: Bengali, English, Santali
- Time zone: UTC+5:30 (IST)
- PIN: 731216
- Lok Sabha constituency: Birbhum
- Vidhan Sabha constituency: Rampurhat
- Website: birbhum.nic.in

Gonpur (also spelled Ganpur) is an old village in Mohammad Bazar CD Block in Suri Sadar subdivision of Birbhum district, West Bengal, India.

== Geography ==
It is situated beside NH 14 (old numbering NH 60). This village is surrounded on four sides with "Ganpur reserved forests". A narrow canal passes through south of the village.

Ganpur is mainly covered with moram soil, and this sal forest is on moram soil. The villagers, living in villages (Ulpahari, Ghaga, Choubata, Shabla etc.) located inside the forest, have realised that they can make a living by selling plates (thalis/"tharis") made of sal leaves.

== Demographics ==
As per the 2011 Census of India, Ganpur had a total population of 2,706 of which 1,347 (50%) were males and 1,359 (50%) were females. Population below 6 years was 257. The total number of literates in Ganpur was 2,059 (84.08% of the population over 6 years).

== Education ==
Basantika Institute of Engineering and Technology (Polytechnic) at Gonpur offers diploma courses in engineering.

There are two primary schools and a high school(H.S) in the village. This schools are well maintained and well equipped with modern facilities. There are about 800 students in the high school offering two streams, arts and science in higher secondary level.

== Culture ==
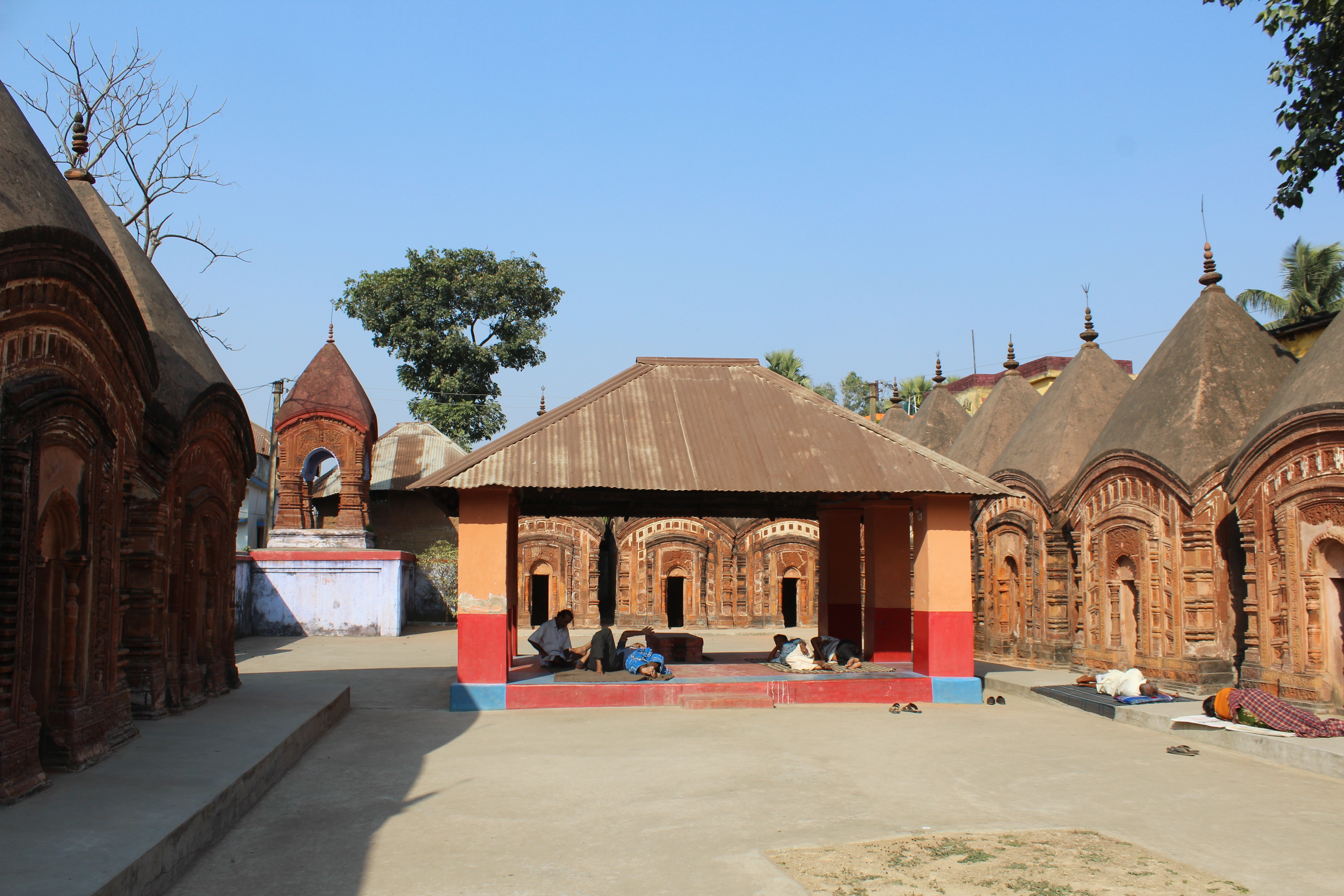
Rameswar Shiva temple complex

David J. McCutchion mentions the many small char chala temples of the 18th and 19th centuries built of brick with facades richly carved, at Ganpur. He also mentions a Visnu temple of the Mondal family, built around 1769. It is an at chala temple built of brick with phulpathar facades richly carved.

Ganpur Sabuj Sansad Gramin Pathagar, a government-sponsored library, was established in 1980. It has its own pucca building.
