= Kankartala =

- Village
- Location in West Bengal, India
- Coordinates: 23.7874°N 87.1995°E
- Country: India
- State: West Bengal
- District: Birbhum

Population (2011)
  - Total: 3,390

Languages
  - Official: Bengali, English
- Time zone: UTC+5:30 (IST)
- PIN: 731125 (Kankartala)
- Telephone/STD code: 03462
- Lok Sabha constituency: Birbhum
- Vidhan Sabha constituency: Dubrajpur
- Website: birbhum.nic.in

Kankartala is a village in Khoyrasol CD Block in Suri Sadar subdivision of Birbhum district in the Indian state of West Bengal.

== Geography ==
Cities and towns in Suri Sadar subdivision of Birbhum district
M: municipal city/ town, CT: census town, R: rural/ urban centre, B: Barrage.
Owing to space constraints in the small map, the actual locations in a larger map may vary slightly

=== Location ===
Kankartala is part of Barrah gram panchayat. Khoyrasol, the CD block headquarters, and Dubrajpur, the nearest town, are 30 km away from Kankartala. Suri, the district headquarters, is 43 km away.

=== Police station ===
Kankartala police station has jurisdiction over a part of Khoyrasol CD block.

== Demographics ==
As per the 2011 Census of India, Kankartala had a total population of 3,390 of which 1,747 (52%) were males and 1,643 (48%) were females. Population below 6 years was 453. The total number of literates in Kankartala was 2,068 (70.41% of the population over 6 years).

== Post Office ==
Kankartala has a delivery branch post office, with PIN 731125, under Khoyrasol sub office and Suri head office. Khoyrasol sub office has the same PIN. Branch offices with the same PIN are Babuijore, Barhara, Bhadulia, Geruapahari, Hazratpur, Jahidpur, Kendragoria, Nabasan, Nakrakonda, Pursundi, Rasa and Sagarbhanga.
