= Pandabeswar railway station =

Railway station in West Bengal, India

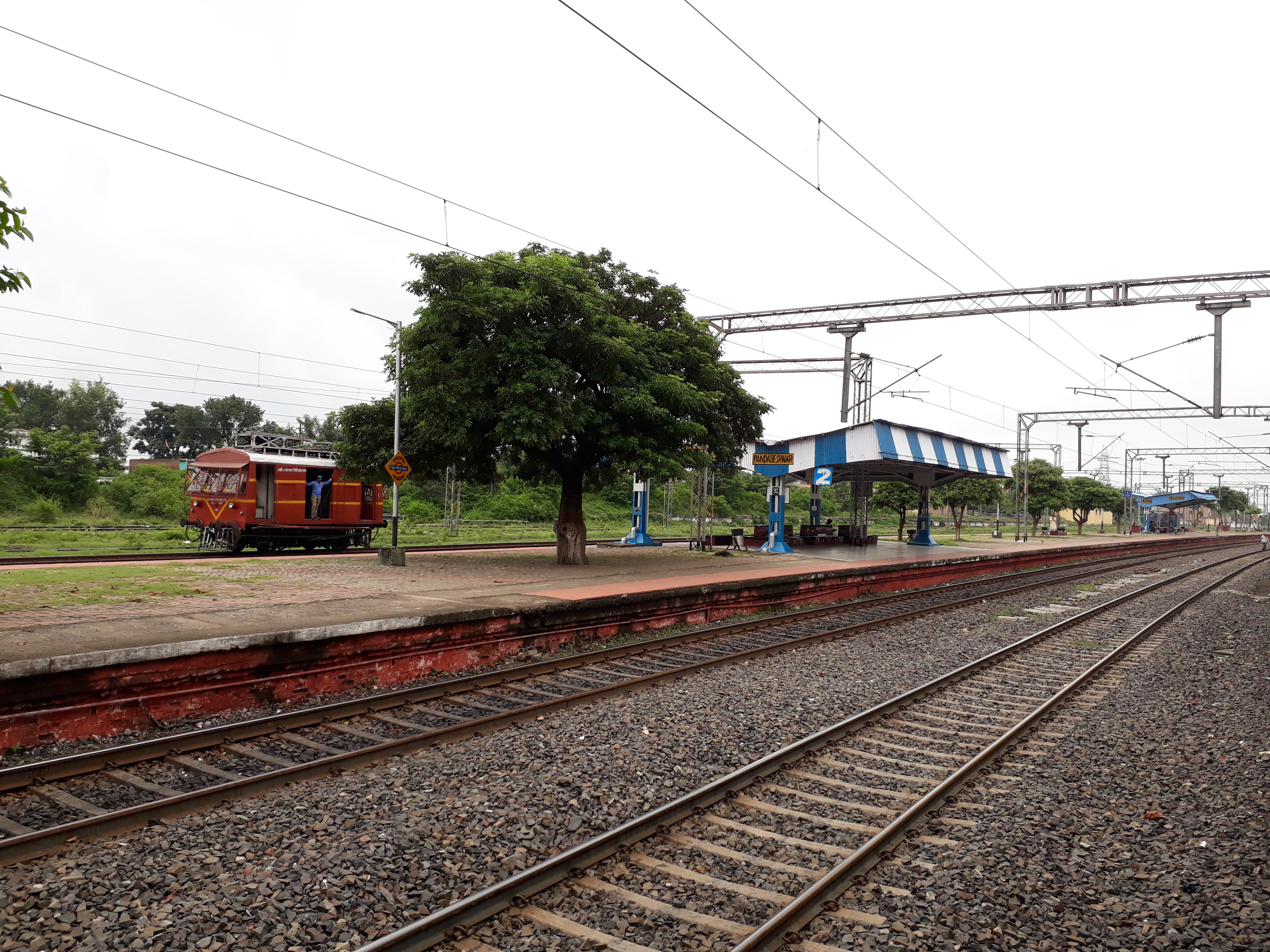
- Pandabeswar railway station platform

General information
- Location: Pandabeswar, Durgapur, West Bengal; India
- Coordinates: 23°25′27″N 87°09′50″E
- Elevation: 88 metres (289 ft)
- System: Indian Railways
- Owner: Indian Railways
- Operator: Eastern Railway
- Lines: Andal–Sainthia branch line Sahibganj loop
- Platforms: 3
- Tracks: 2

Construction
- Structure type: Standard (on ground station)
- Parking: Yes

Other information
- Status: Functioning
- Station code: PAW
- Division(s): Asansol

History
- Opened: 1913
- Electrified: 2010–11
- Former names: East Indian Railway Company

Services
Preceding station	Indian Railways	Following station
Ukhra towards Andal Junction	Eastern Railway zone Andal–Sainthia branch line	Bhimgara Junction towards Sainthia Junction
Location

Pandabeswar railway station is a railway station of Andal–Sainthia branch line of the Asansol railway division connecting from Andal to Sainthia on the Sahibganj loop line. This is under the jurisdiction of Eastern Railway zone of Indian Railways. It is situated at Pandabeswar, the suburban town of Durgapur city in Paschim Bardhaman district in the Indian state of West Bengal. The railway station serves Pandaveswar Area. Number of Express and Passenger train stop at Pandabeswar railway station.

== History ==
The Andal–Sainthia branch line was built in 1913. Electrification of Andal–Pandabeshwar section including Pandabeswar railway station was completed in 2010–11 and Pandabeshwar-Saithia route was completed in 2016.
