= Krishna Kanta Saha =

Indian politician (born 1987)

Member of the West Bengal Legislative Assembly
- Incumbent
- Assumed office 4 May 2026
- Preceded by: Nilabati Saha
- Constituency: Sainthia

Personal details
- Party: Bharatiya Janata Party
- Profession: Politician

Krishna Kanta Saha (born 1987) is an Indian politician from West Bengal. He is a member of West Bengal Legislative Assembly from the Sainthia Assembly constituency, which is reserved for Scheduled Caste community, in Birbhum district representing the Bharatiya Janata Party.

== Early life ==
Saha is from Sainthia, Birbhum district, West Bengal. He is the son of Ananda Saha. He completed his BA in geography (honours) in 2008 at a college affiliated with Burdwan University. He runs his own business. He declared assets worth Rs.1 crore in his affidavit to the Election Commission of India.

== Career ==
Saha won the Sainthia Assembly constituency representing the Bharatiya Janata Party in the 2026 West Bengal Legislative Assembly election. He polled 1,15,054 votes and defeated his nearest rival, Nilabati Saha of the All India Trinamool Congress (AITC), by a margin of 10,306 votes.

== See also ==
- 2026 West Bengal Legislative Assembly election
- List of chief ministers of West Bengal
- West Bengal Legislative Assembly
- 18th West Bengal Assembly
