= Bhimgara =

Bhimgara Bhimgara
- Town
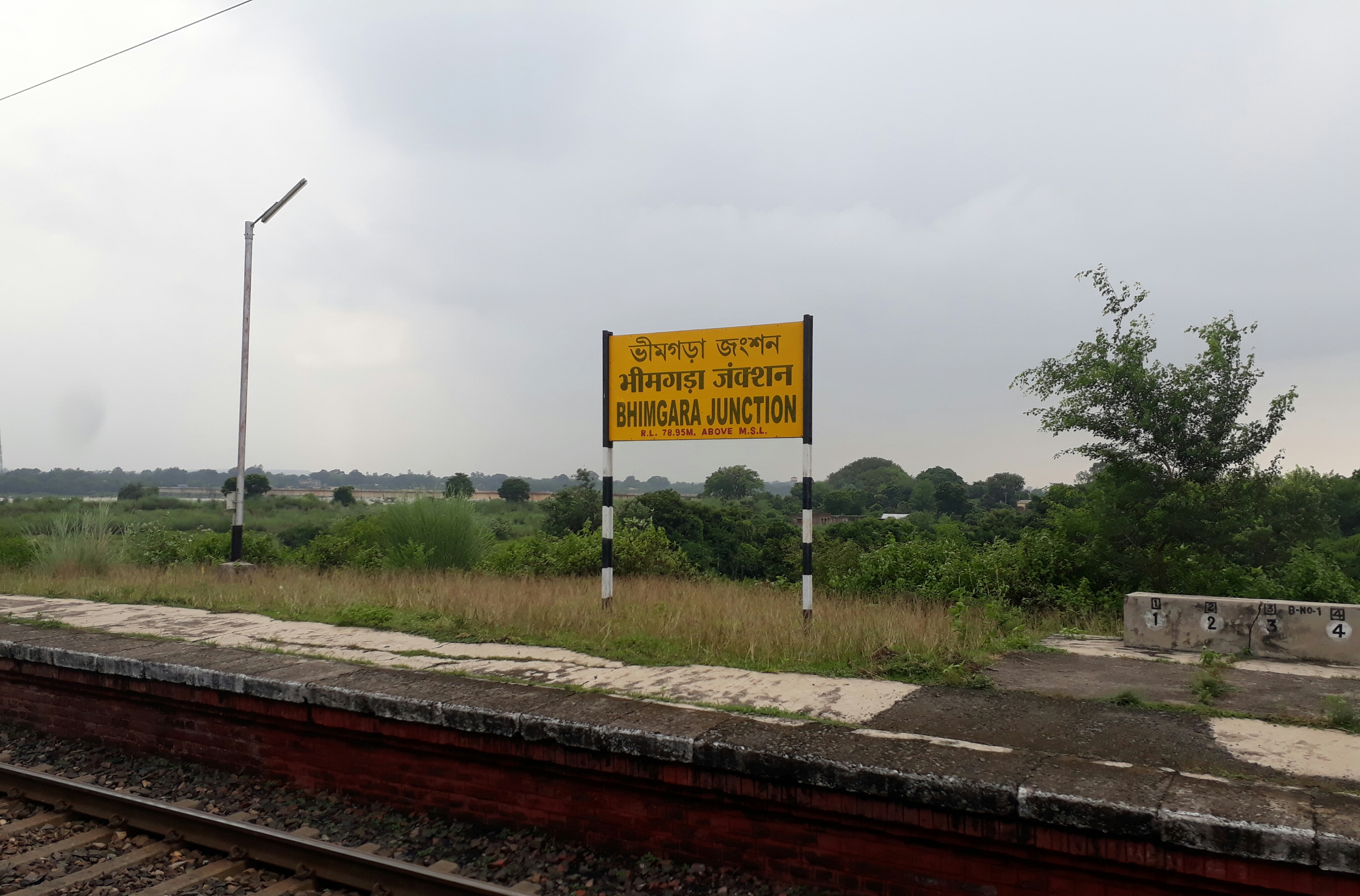
- Bhimgarh Jn. railway station

- Location in West Bengal, India Bhimgara (India)
- Coordinates: 23.7419800°N 87.2872500°E
- Country: India
- State: West Bengal
- District: Birbhum

Languages
  - Official: Bengali, English
- Time zone: UTC+5:30 (IST)
- Vehicle registration: WB
- Lok Sabha constituency: Birbhum
- Vidhan Sabha constituency: Dubrajpur
- Website: birbhum.nic.in

Bhimgara is a village in Khoyrasol CD Block in Suri Sadar subdivision of Birbhum district in the Indian state of West Bengal.

== Geography ==
Bhimgarh is located at 23°44′31″N 87°17′14″E on the north bank of Ajay River.

== History ==
There are remains of an old fort with low earthen ramparts beaten by the weather to low gentle mounds. The place is attributed to the five Pandavas, who are said to have stayed here for some time during their exile. On the other side of the river is Pandaveswar, where there are some temples also attributed to the Pandavas. There is a small temple known as Bhimeswara with a lingam supposed to have been set up by Bhim, one of the Pandavas.

== Transport ==
Bhimgara Junction railway station is situated on the Andal-Sainthia Branch Line of Eastern Railway. As of 2018, the Bhimgara-Palasthali line has remained in-operative.

NH 14, running from Morgam (in Murshidabad district) to Kharagpur (in Paschim Medinipur district), passes through Bhimgara.
