= Panrui =

- Village
- Location in West Bengal, India Panrui (India)
- Coordinates: 23.78024°N 87.60722°E
- Country: India
- State: West Bengal
- District: Birbhum
- Elevation: 61 m (200 ft)

Population (2016)
  - Total: 1,146

Languages
  - Official: Bengali, English
- Time zone: UTC+5:30 (IST)
- PIN: 731121
- Lok Sabha constituency: Bolpur
- Vidhan Sabha constituency: Labpur

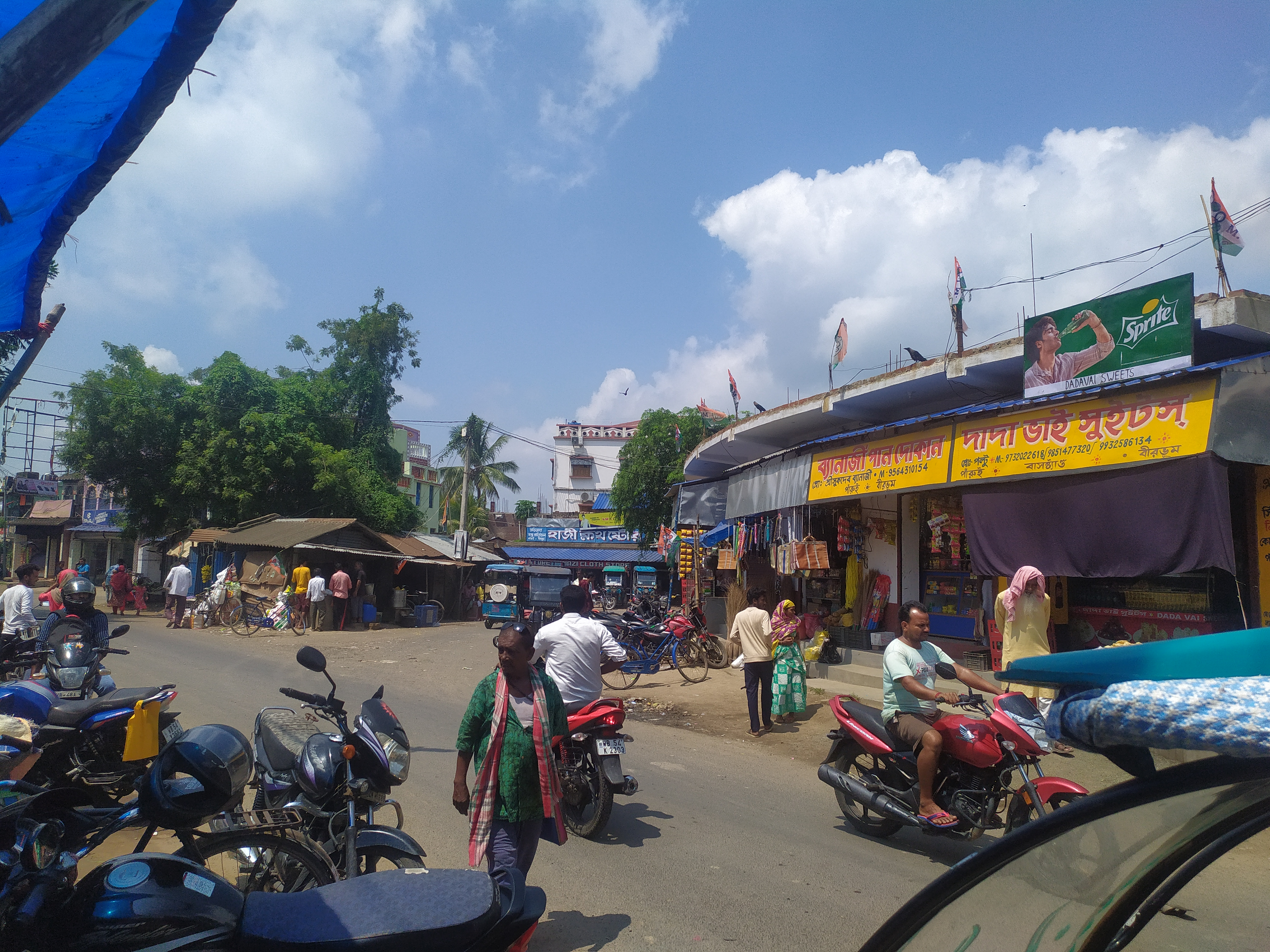
Panrui Market

Panrui is a village in Sainthia and a community development block in the Suri Sadar subdivision of the Birbhum district, West Bengal, India. It is about 160 km (99 mi) from Kolkata and 18 km (11 mi) from Visva-Bharati University. It is also 18 km (11 mi) from Siuri, the sadar town of Birbhum district. It has a population of 1,146.

== Geography ==
Cities and towns in Suri Sadar subdivision of Birbhum district
M: municipal city/ town, CT: census town, R: rural/ urban centre, B: Barrage.
Owing to space constraints in the small map, the actual locations in a larger map may vary slightly

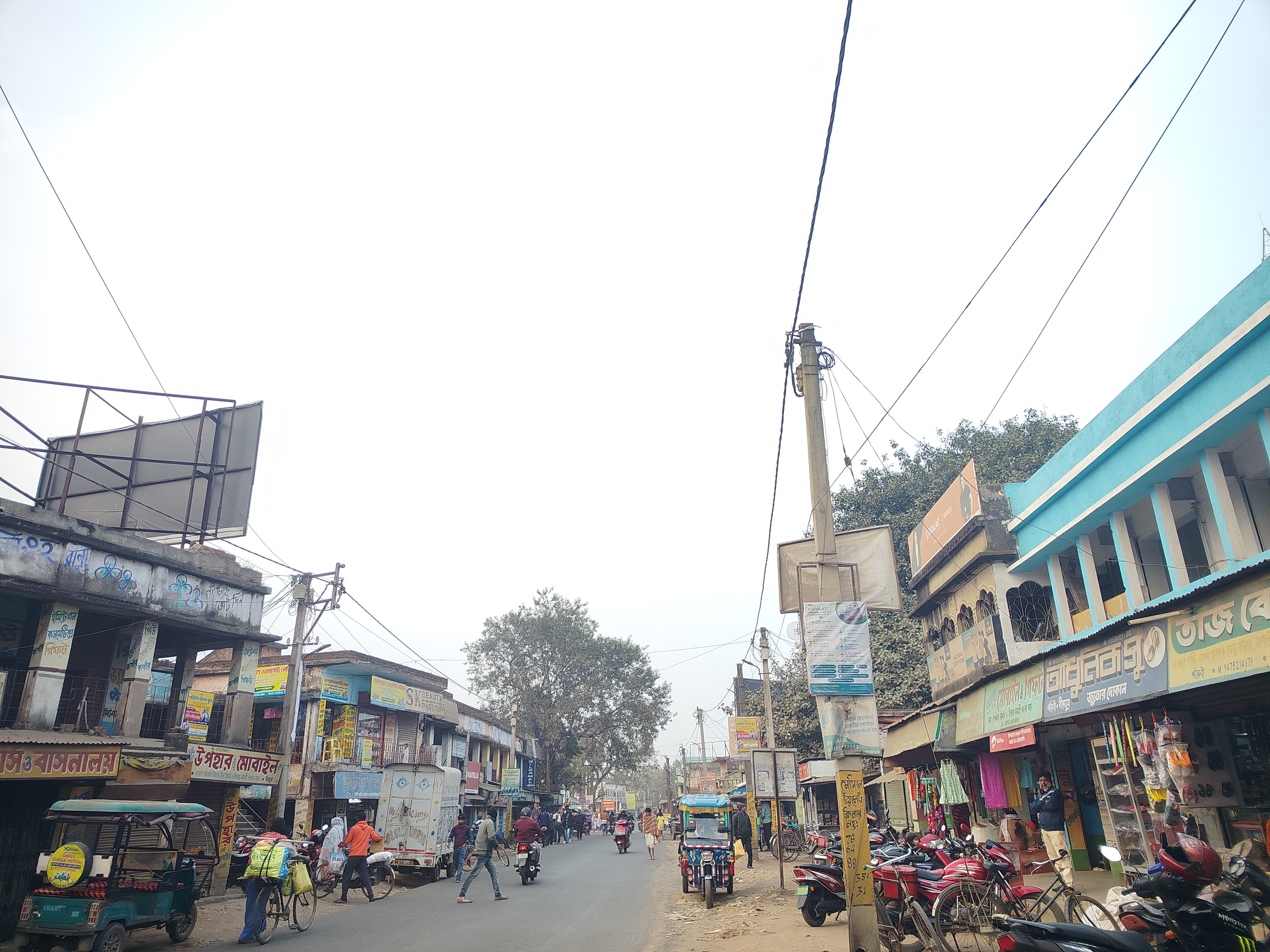
Panrui during winter

== Police station ==
The Panrui police station has jurisdiction over the panrui community development block.

== Demographics ==
According to the 2011 Census of India, Panrui had a total population of 923 people, 478 (52%) of which were males and 445 (48%) were females. There were 114 persons under the age of six. The total number of literate people in Panrui was 632 (78.12% of the population over 6 years).

Religion in Panrui
Panrui	Percent
Hindu	93.29%
Muslim	6.71%

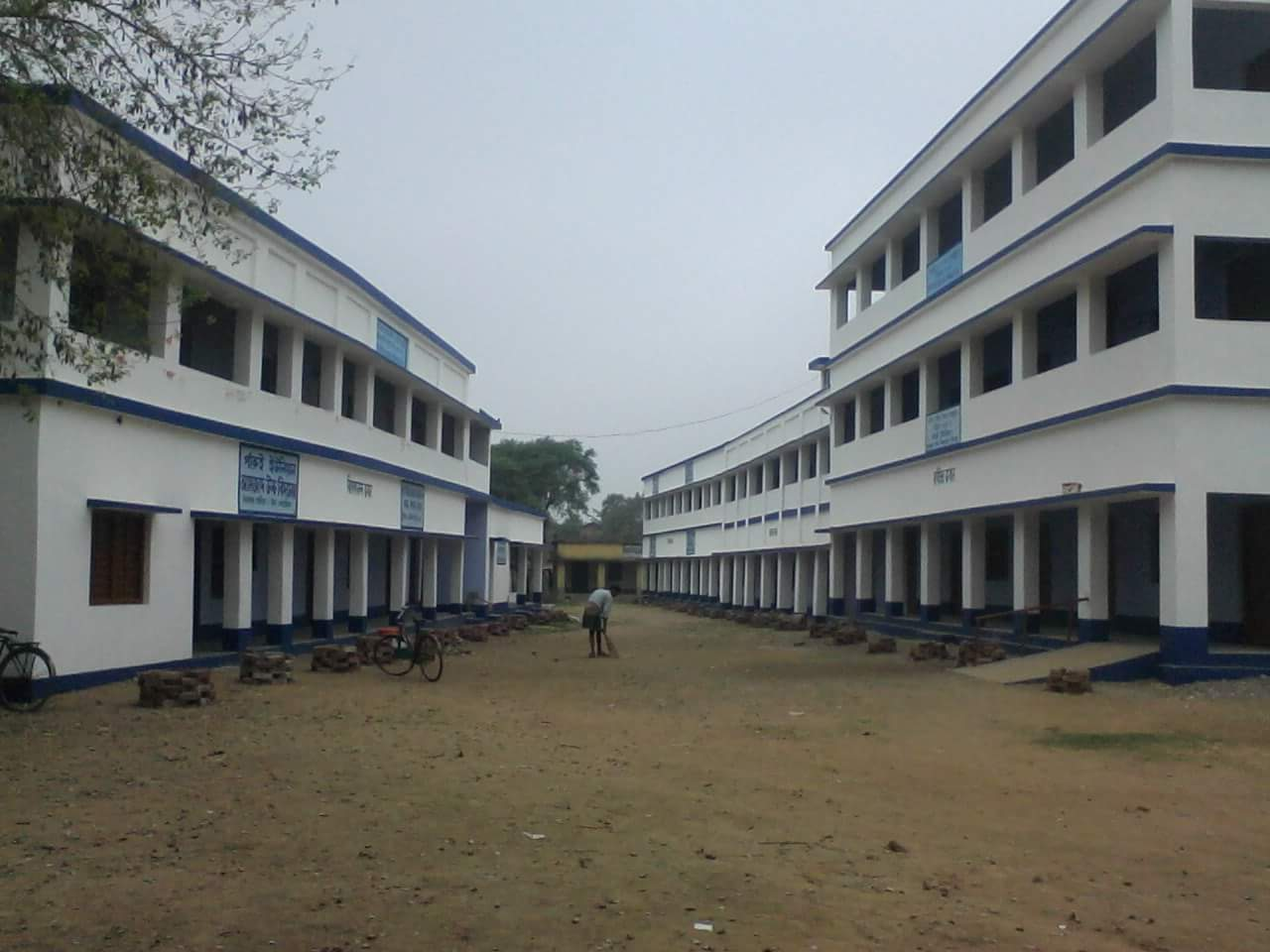
Panrui Union Amjad High School
