= Nilabati Saha =

Indian politician

Member of the West Bengal Legislative Assembly
- In office 19 May 2016 – 5 May 2026
- Preceded by: Dhiren Bagdi
- Succeeded by: Krishna Kanta Saha
- Constituency: Sainthia

Personal details
- Party: Trinamool Congress

Nilabati Saha is an Indian politician. She was elected to the West Bengal Legislative Assembly from Sainthia as a member of the Trinamool Congress.
