= Sainthia (community development block) =

- Community development block
- Location in West Bengal
- Coordinates: 23°49′38″N 87°42′07″E
- Country: India
- State: West Bengal
- District: Birbhum
- Parliamentary constituency: Birbhum
- Assembly constituency: Sainthia

Area
  - Total: 304.39 km^{2} (117.53 sq mi)

Population (2011)
  - Total: 195,349
  - Density: 641.77/km^{2} (1,662.2/sq mi)
- Time zone: UTC+5.30 (IST)
- Literacy Rate: 72.33 per cent
- Website: http://birbhum.nic.in/

Sainthia is a community development block that forms an administrative division in Suri Sadar subdivision of Birbhum district in the Indian state of West Bengal.

== Overview ==
Birbhum district is physiographically a part of the ancient Rarh region. The western portion of the district is basically an extension of the Chota Nagpur Plateau. The area has mostly loose reddish lateritic low fertility soil. In the east, the flood plains of the major rivers, such as the Ajay, Bakreshwar, Mayurakshi and Brahmani, have soft alluvial soil. The forest cover is only 3.5% of the total district. Although coal is found in the district and Bakreshwar Thermal Power Station has a capacity of 2,010 MW, the economic condition of Birbhum is dominated by agriculture. From 1977 onwards majorland reforms took place in West Bengal. Land in excess of land ceiling was acquired and distributed amongst the peasants. In Birbhum district, 19,968 hectares of vested agricultural land has been distributed amongst 161,515 beneficiaries, till 2011. However, more than 38% of the operational land holding is marginal or less than 1 acre. The proportion of agricultural labourers amongst total workers in Birbhum district is 45.9%, the highest amongst all districts of West Bengal. Culturally rich Birbhum, with such traditional landmarks as Jaydev Kenduli and Chandidas Nanoor, is home to Visva-Bharati University at Santiniketan, having close association with two Nobel laureates – Rabindranath Tagore and Amartya Sen.

== Geography ==
Map of Birbhum district showing CD blocks and municipal areas. Click on the map to view larger map.

Ahmedpur is located at 23°49′38″N 87°42′07″E.

Sainthia CD Block is part of the Suri-Bolpur Plain, one of the four sub-micro physiographic regions of Birbhum district. It covers the interfluves of the Mayurakshi and Ajay rivers, in the south-eastern part of the district. This area exhibits somewhat upland topography sloping from north-west to south-east.

Sainthia CD Block is bounded by Mohammad Bazar, Mayureswar I and Mayureswar II CD Blocks on the north, Labpur CD Block on the east, Bolpur Sriniketan CD Block on the south and Suri I and Suri II CD Blocks on the west.

Sainthia CD Block has an area of 304.39 km^{2}. It has 1 Municipality, 1 Panchayat Samity, 12 Gram Panchayats, 119 Gram Sansads (Village Councils), 230 Mouzas and 216 inhabited villages. Sainthia police station serves this block. Headquarters of this CD Block is at Ahmedpur.

The only one Municipality of Sainthia block is Sainthia. Gram panchayats of Sainthia block/panchayat samiti are: Ahmedpur, Amarpur, Banogram, Bhromorkol, Deriapur, Fulur, Harisara, Hatora, Mathapalsa, Panrui Sangra and Srinidhipur.

== Demographics ==
=== Population ===
As per the 2011 Census of India, Sainthia CD Block had a total population of 195,349, of which 186,107 were rural and 9,242 were urban. There were 100,141 (51%) males and 95,208 (49%) females. Population below 6 years was 22,721. Scheduled Castes numbered 68,859 (35.25%) and Scheduled Tribes numbered 24,019 (12.30%).

As per 2001 census, Sainthia block had a total population of 176,124, out of which 90,434 were males and 85,690 were females. Sainthia block registered a population growth of 13.55 per cent during the 1991-2001 decade. Decadal growth for Birbhum district was 17.88 per cent. Decadal growth in West Bengal was 17.84 per cent.

City in Sainthia CD Block is (2011 census figures in brackets): Sainthia (44,601).

Census Town in Sainthia CD Block is (2011 census figures in brackets): Ahmadpur (9,242).

Large village (with 4,000+ population) in Sainthia CD Block is (2011 census figure in brackets): Amua (4,398).

Other villages in Sainthia CD Block include (2011 census figures in brackets): Panrui (923), Srinidhipur (654), Fulur (1,117), Matpalsha (3,756), Bangram (823), Harisara (1,187) and Bharamarkol (1,913).

=== Literacy ===
As per the 2011 census the total number of literates in Sainthia CD Block was 124,849 (72.33% of the population over 6 years) out of which males numbered 69,920 (78.94% of the male population over 6 years) and females numbered 54,929 (65.35% of the female population over 6 years). The gender disparity (the difference between female and male literacy rates) was 13.59%.

See also – List of West Bengal districts ranked by literacy rate

Literacy in CD blocks of
Birbhum district
Rampurhat subdivision
Murarai I – 55.67%
Murarai II – 58.28%
Nalhati I – 69.83%
Nalhati II – 71.68%
Rampurhat I – 73.29%
Rampurhat II – 70.77%
Mayureswar I – 71.52%
Mayureswar II – 70.89%
Suri Sadar subdivision
Mohammad Bazar – 65.18%
Rajnagar – 68.10%
Suri I – 72.75%
Suri II – 72.75%
Sainthia – 72.33%
Dubrajpur – 68.26%
Khoyrasol – 68.75%
Bolpur subdivision
Bolpur Sriniketan – 70.67%
Ilambazar – 74.27%
Labpur – 71.20%
Nanoor – 69.45%
2011 Census: CD Block Wise

Primary Census Abstract Data

=== Language and religion ===
Religion in Sainthia CD block (2011)
Hinduism	77.68%
Islam	21.46%
Other or not stated	0.86%

In the 2011 census, Hindus numbered 151,743 and formed 77.68% of the population in Sainthia CD Block. Muslims numbered 41,931 and formed 21.46% of the population. Christians numbered 765 and formed 0.39% of the population. Others numbered 910 and formed 0.47% of the population.

The proportion of Hindus in Birbhum district has declined from 72.2% in 1961 to 62.3% in 2011. The proportion of Muslims in Birbhum district has increased from 27.6% to 37.1% during the same period. Christians formed 0.3% in 2011.

Languages in Sainthia CD block (2011)
1. Bengali (87.4%)
2. Santali (11.1%)
3. Others (1.45%)

At the time of the 2011 census, 87.44% of the population spoke Bengali and 11.11% Santali as their first language.

== Rural poverty ==
As per the BPL household survey carried out in 2005, the proportion of BPL households in Sainthia CD Block was 31.9%, against 42.3% in Birbhum district. In six CD Blocks – Murarai II, Nalhati II, Rampurhat II, Rampurhat I, Suri II and Murarai I – the proportion of BPL families was more than 50%. In three CD Blocks – Rajnagar, Suri I and Labhpur – the proportion of BPL families was less than 30%. The other ten CD Blocks in Birbhum district were placed in between. According to the District Human Development Report, Birbhum, “Although there is no indication that the share of BPL households is more in blocks with higher share of agricultural labourer, there is a clear pattern that the share of BPL households is more in blocks with disadvantaged population in general and Muslim population in particular.” (The disadvantaged population includes SCs, STs and Muslims.)

== Economy ==
=== Livelihood ===
Livelihood
in Saithia CD Block
1. Cultivators (21.7%)
2. Agricultural labourers (55.0%)
3. Household industries (3.34%)
4. Other Workers (20.0%)

In Sainthia CD Block in 2011, amongst the class of total workers, cultivators numbered 17,518 and formed 21.68%, agricultural labourers numbered 44,406 and formed 54.97%, household industry workers numbered 2,697 and formed 3.34% and other workers numbered 16,167 and formed 20.01%. Total workers numbered 80,788 and formed 41.36% of the total population, and non-workers numbered 114,561 and formed 58.64% of the population.

Note: In the census records a person is considered a cultivator, if the person is engaged in cultivation/ supervision of land owned by self/government/institution. When a person who works on another person's land for wages in cash or kind or share, is regarded as an agricultural labourer. Household industry is defined as an industry conducted by one or more members of the family within the household or village, and one that does not qualify for registration as a factory under the Factories Act. Other workers are persons engaged in some economic activity other than cultivators, agricultural labourers and household workers. It includes factory, mining, plantation, transport and office workers, those engaged in business and commerce, teacher s, entertainment artistes and so on.

=== Infrastructure ===
There are 216 inhabited villages in Sainthia CD Block, as per District Census Handbook, Birbhum, 2011. 100% villages have power supply. 214 villages (99.07%) have drinking water supply. 40 villages (18.52%) have post offices. 209 villages (96.76%) have telephones (including landlines, public call offices and mobile phones). 75 villages (34.72%) have pucca (paved) approach roads and 74 villages (34.26%) have transport communication (includes bus service, rail facility and navigable waterways). 18 villages (8.33%) have agricultural credit societies and 2 villages (0.93%) have banks.

=== Agriculture ===
Following land reforms land ownership pattern has undergone transformation. In 2004-05 (the agricultural labourer data is for 2001), persons engaged in agriculture in Sainthia CD Block could be classified as follows: bargadars 7,982 (13.22%), patta (document) holders 7,825 (12.96%), small farmers (possessing land between 1 and 2 hectares) 6,475 (10.72%), marginal farmers (possessing land up to 1 hectare) 6,500 (10.77%) and agricultural labourers 31,594 (52.33%).

Birbhum is a predominantly paddy cultivation-based agricultural district. The area under paddy cultivation in 2010-11 was 249,000 hectares of land. Paddy is grown in do, suna and sali classes of land. There is double to triple cropping system for paddy cultivation. Other crops grown in Birbhum are gram, masuri, peas, wheat, linseed, khesari, til, sugarcane and occasionally cotton. 192,470 hectares of cultivable land is under irrigation by different sources, such as canals, tanks, river lift irrigation and different types of tubewells. In 2009–10, 158,380 hectares were irrigated by canal water. There are such major irrigation projects as Mayurakshi and Hijli. Other rivers such as Ajoy, Brahmani, Kuskurni, Dwaraka, Hingla and Kopai are also helpful for irrigation in the district.

In 2013–14, there were 74 fertiliser depots, 13 seed stores and 38 fair price shops in Sainthia CD block

In 2013–14, Sainthia CD block produced 68,186 tonnes of Aman paddy, the main winter crop, from 22,907 hectares, 21,027 tonnes of Boro paddy (spring crop) from 5,976 hectares, 4,470 tonnes of wheat from 1,759 hectares, 26,264 tonnes of potatoes from 1,338 hectares and 12,872 tonnes of sugar cane from 220 hectares. It also produced pulses and oilseeds.

In 2013–14, the total area irrigated in Sainthia CD block was 26,170 hectares, out of which 18,100 hectares were irrigated by canal water, 1,660 hectares by tank water, 60 hectares by river lift irrigation, 5,000 hectares by deep tube wells and 1,350 hectares by shallow tube wells.

=== Banking ===
In 2013–14, Saithia CD block had offices of 16 commercial banks and 5 gramin banks.

=== Other sectors ===
According to the District Human Development Report, 2009, Birbhum is one of the most backward districts of West Bengal in terms of industrial development. Of the new industrial projects set-up in West Bengal between 1991 and 2005, only 1.23% came to Birbhum. Bakreshwar Thermal Power Station is the only large-scale industry in the district and employs about 5,000 people. There are 4 medium-scale industries and 4,748 registered small-scale industries.

The proportion of workers engaged in agriculture in Birbhum has been decreasing. According to the District Human Development Report, “more people are now engaged in non-agricultural activities, such as fishing, retail sales, vegetable vending, selling milk, and so on. As all these activities are at the lower end of the spectrum of marketable skills, it remains doubtful if these activities generate enough return for their family’s sustenance.”

=== Backward Regions Grant Fund ===
Birbhum district is listed as a backward region and receives financial support from the Backward Regions Grant Fund. The fund, created by the Government of India, is designed to redress regional imbalances in development. As of 2012, 272 districts across the country were listed under this scheme. The list includes 11 districts of West Bengal.

== Transport ==
Sainthia CD block has 1 ferry service and 8 originating/ terminating bus routes.

The Khana-Barharwa section of Sahibganj loop passes through this block. There are stations at Sainthia, Bataspur and Ahmadpur.

The Andal-Sainthia branch line originates from Sainthia and there is a station at Kunuri.

NH 114, running from Mallarpur to Bardhaman, SH 6, running from Rajnagar to Alampur, and SH 11, running from Mohammad Bazar to Ranaghat, pass through Sainthia CD Block.

== Education ==
In 2013–14, Sainthia CD block had 176 primary schools with 11,006 students, 21 middle schools with 1,865 students, 13 high schools with 6,397 students and 7 higher secondary schools with 9,139 students. Sainthia CD Block had 6 technical/ professional institutions with 542 students and 445 institutions for special and non-formal education with 10,130 students. Sainthia municipal area had 1 general degree college (outside the CD block).

As per the 2011 census, in Sainthia CD Block, amongst the 216 inhabited villages, 30 villages did not have a school, 35 villages had more than 1 primary school, 39 villages had at least 1 primary and 1 middle school and 20 villages had at least 1 middle and 1 secondary school. 8 villages had senior secondary schools.

== Healthcare ==
In 2014, the Sainthia CD block had 5 primary health centers with total 47 beds and 5 doctors (excluding private bodies). It had 33 family welfare subcentres. 26,559 patients were treated indoor and 31,329 patients were treated outdoor in the hospitals, health centers and sub-centers of the CD block.

As per 2011 census, in Sainthia CD Block, 2 villages had community health centers, 5 villages had primary health centers, 37 villages had primary health subcentres, 8 villages had maternity and child welfare centers, 2 villages had veterinary hospitals, 14 villages had medicine shops and out of the 216 inhabited villages 131 villages had no medical facilities.

Sainthia State General Hospital at Sainthia has 100 beds. There are primary health centres at Amarpur (PO Gargaria) (10 beds), Bharmarkole (PO Kachuihata) (10 beds), Sangra (PO Chhotosangra) (10 beds) Srinidhipur (PO Purbasiur) (6 beds) and Iswarpur (PO Ahmedpur) (10 beds).
