= Labpur Assembly constituency =

Labpur
- Constituency No. 288 for the West Bengal Legislative Assembly
- Interactive Map Outlining Labpur Assembly Constituency

Constituency details
- Country: India
- Region: East India
- State: West Bengal
- District: Birbhum
- Lok Sabha constituency: Bolpur
- Established: 1957
- Total electors: 186,852
- Reservation: None

Member of Legislative Assembly
- 18th West Bengal Legislative Assembly
- Incumbent Debasis Ojha
- Party: BJP
- Alliance: NDA
- Elected year: 2026

Labpur Assembly constituency is an assembly constituency in Birbhum district in the Indian state of West Bengal.

== Overview ==
As per orders of the Delimitation Commission, No. 288 Labpur Assembly constituency is composed of the following: Labpur CD Block and Ahmedpur, Amarpur, Bhromorkol, Panrui, Sangra and Shrinidhipur gram panchayats of Sainthia CD Block.

Labpur Assembly constituency is part of No. 41 Bolpur Lok Sabha constituency (SC).

== Members of the Legislative Assembly ==
Year	Name	Party
1957	Radhanath Chattoraj	Communist Party of India
1962	Radhanath Chattoraj	Communist Party of India
1967	S. Bandopadhyay	Indian National Congress
1969	Radhanath Chattoraj	Communist Party of India (Marxist)
1971	Sunil Kumar Mazumdar	Communist Party of India
1972	Nirmal Krishna Sinha	Communist Party of India
1977	Sunil Kumar Mazumdar	Communist Party of India (Marxist)
1982	Sunil Kumar Mazumdar	Communist Party of India (Marxist)
1987	Sunil Kumar Mazumdar	Communist Party of India (Marxist)
1991	Manik Chandra Mondal	Communist Party of India (Marxist)
1996	Manik Chandra Mondal	Communist Party of India (Marxist)
2001	Nabanita Mukherjee	Communist Party of India (Marxist)
2006	Nabanita Mukherjee	Communist Party of India (Marxist)
2011	Monirul Islam	Trinamool Congress
2016	Monirul Islam	Trinamool Congress
2021	Abhijit Sinha	Trinamool Congress
2026	Debasis Ojha	Bharatiya Janata Party

== Election results ==
Vote share of Winning candidates
2026	47.71%
2021	51.14%
2016	52.40%
2011	47.68%
2006	57.28%
2001	54.53%
1996	60.48%
1991	58.22%
1987	59.49%
1982	57.20%
1977	53.59%
1972	50.54%
1971	50.32%
1969	52.61%
1967	59.24%
1962	37.73%
1957	47.07%

=== 2026 ===
2026 West Bengal Legislative Assembly election: Labpur
Party	Candidate	Votes	%	±%
BJP	Debasis Ojha	106,402	47.71	▲5.05
AITC	Abhijit Sinha	102,852	46.12	▼5.02
CPI(M)	Manasa Hansda	6,156	2.76	▼0.3
NOTA	None of the above	3,145	1.41	▼0.03
Majority		3,550	1.59	▼6.89
Turnout		223,002	94.8	▲6.47
BJP gain from AITC		Swing		

=== 2021 ===
2021 West Bengal Legislative Assembly election: Labpur
Party	Candidate	Votes	%	±%
AITC	Abhijit Sinha	108,423	51.14	▼1.26
BJP	Biswajit Mondal	90,448	42.66	▲33.59
CPI(M)	Syed Mahfuzul Karim	6,479	3.06	▼33.63
Independent	Monirul Islam	1,992	0.94	
NOTA	None of the above	3,057	1.44	
Majority		17,975	8.48	
Turnout		212,027	88.33	
AITC hold		Swing		

=== 2016 ===
2016 West Bengal Legislative Assembly election: Labpur
Party	Candidate	Votes	%	±%
AITC	Monirul Islam	101,138	52.40	▲4.72
CPI(M)	Syed Mahfuzul Karim	70,825	36.69	▼9.17
BJP	Nirmal Chandra Mondal	17,513	9.07	▲2.61
NOTA	None of the above	3,536	1.83	New entry
Majority		30,313	15.71	▲13.89
Turnout		1,93,012	88.38	▲0.08
AITC hold		Swing		

=== 2011 ===
2011 West Bengal Legislative Assembly election: Labpur
Party	Candidate	Votes	%	±%
AITC	Monirul Islam	78,697	47.68	
CPI(M)	Nabanita Mukherjee	75,691	45.86	
BJP	Kashi Nath Mishra	10,668	6.46	
Majority		3,006	1.82	
Turnout		1,65,056	88.30	
AITC gain from CPI(M)		Swing		

=== 2006 ===
2006 West Bengal Legislative Assembly election: Labhpur
Party	Candidate	Votes	%	±%
CPI(M)	Nabanita Mukherjee	64,806	57.28	
AITC	Ojha Debasis	33,582	29.68	
INC	Ratna Das	8,065	7.13	
BSP	Anil Kumar Majhi	2,088	1.85	
Independent	Das Lalon	2,030	1.79	
PDS	Sk. Karibul Haque	1,949	1.72	
Majority		31,224	27.60	
Turnout		113,139		
Swing to CPI(M) from AITC		Swing		

=== 2001 ===
2001 West Bengal Legislative Assembly election: Labhpur
Party	Candidate	Votes	%	±%
CPI(M)	Nabanita Mukherjee	59,011	54.53	
AITC	Arup Kumar Misra	40,306	37.24	
BJP	Pranab Ukil	6,218	5.75	
PDS	Swarup Chatterjee	2,690	2.49	
Majority		18,705	17.29	
Turnout		108,271	77.03	
Swing to CPI(M) from AITC		Swing		

=== 1996 ===
1996 West Bengal Legislative Assembly election: Labhpur
Party	Candidate	Votes	%	±%
CPI(M)	Manik Chandra Mondal	64,383	60.48	
INC	Deb Ranjan Mukhopadhayay	35,155	33.02	
BJP	Shambhu Nath Debangshi	6,037	5.67	
Independent	Mandal Ganapati	443	0.42	
SAP	Mandal Rabindra Nath	225	0.21	
Independent	Banamali Sil	214	0.20	
Majority		29,228	27.46	
Turnout		108,586	82.86	
Swing to CPI(M) from INC		Swing		

=== 1991 ===
1991 West Bengal Legislative Assembly election: Labhpur
Party	Candidate	Votes	%	±%
CPI(M)	Manik Chandra Mandal	55,934	58.22	
INC	Eunus Mallick	21,521	22.40	
BJP	Shambhu Nath Debangshi	17,742	18.47	
Independent	Kartick Ghosh	870	0.91	
Majority		34,413	35.82	
Turnout		98,349	78.59	
Swing to CPI(M) from INC		Swing		

=== 1987 ===
1987 West Bengal Legislative Assembly election: Labhpur
Party	Candidate	Votes	%	±%
CPI(M)	Sunil Majumdar	51,516	59.49	
INC	Eunus Mallick	32,853	37.94	
Independent	Manik Bhattacharya	1,329	1.53	
Independent	Subhendu Mondal	322	0.37	
LKD	Mrityunjoy Chatterjee	270	0.31	
Independent	Dey Narayan	219	0.25	
Independent	Sanat Kumar Dutta	80	0.09	
Majority		18,663	21.55	
Turnout		87,746	78.99	
Swing to CPI(M) from INC		Swing		

=== 1982 ===
1982 West Bengal Legislative Assembly election: Labhpur
Party	Candidate	Votes	%	±%
CPI(M)	Sunil Majumder	41,094	57.20	
INC	Sisir Dutta	29,969	41.72	
JP	Nisinath Sen	778	1.08	
Majority		11,125	15.48	
Turnout		73,279	80.66	
Swing to CPI(M) from INC		Swing		

=== 1977 ===
1977 West Bengal Legislative Assembly election: Labhpur
Party	Candidate	Votes	%	±%
CPI(M)	Sunil Kumar Mazumdar	18,853	53.59	
INC	Eunis Mallick	7,016	19.94	
JP	Sukhendra Kumar Roy	4,683	13.31	
CPI	Nirmal Krishna Sinha	2,263	6.43	
Independent	Byom Sanmar Sen	641	1.82	
Independent	Ram Kumar Sen	622	1.77	
Independent	Sk. Samani	478	1.36	
Independent	Narayan Chandra Patra	445	1.26	
Independent	Sanat Kumar Chattopadhyay	182	0.52	
Majority		11,837	33.65	
Turnout		36,183	49.77	
Swing to CPI(M) from INC		Swing		

=== 1972 ===
1972 West Bengal Legislative Assembly election: Labhpur
Party	Candidate	Votes	%	±%
CPI	Nirmal Krishna Sinha	15,304	50.54	
CPI(M)	Sunil Majumder	14,976	49.46	
Majority		328	1.08	
Turnout		31,262	48.50	
Swing to CPI from CPI(M)		Swing		

=== 1971 ===
1971 West Bengal Legislative Assembly election: Labhpur
Party	Candidate	Votes	%	±%
CPI(M)	Sunil Mazumdar	15,536	50.32	
Bangla Congress	Sasanka Sekhar Buj	6,996	22.66	
INC	Sisir Kumar Dutta	5,271	17.07	
SUCI	Anita Mukherjee	2,023	6.55	
INC(O)	Sukhendra Kumar Roy	1,050	3.40	
Majority		8,540	27.66	
Turnout		33,360	52.18	
Swing to CPI(M) from Bangla Congress		Swing		

=== 1969 ===
1969 West Bengal Legislative Assembly election: Labhpur
Party	Candidate	Votes	%	±%
CPI(M)	Radhanath Chattoraj	16,953	52.61	
INC	Kali Kinkar Mukhopadhyay	13,352	41.43	
NDF	Kalipada Garai	1,065	3.30	
PML	Mohammad Hanif	854	2.65	
Majority		3,601	11.18	
Turnout		33,428	56.13	
Swing to CPI(M) from INC		Swing		

=== 1967 ===
1967 West Bengal Legislative Assembly election: Labhpur
Party	Candidate	Votes	%	±%
INC	S. Bandyopadhyay	19,063	59.24	
CPI(M)	R. Chattoraj	13,115	40.76	
Majority		5,948	18.48	
Turnout		33,749	56.37	
Swing to INC from CPI(M)		Swing		

=== 1962 ===
1962 West Bengal Legislative Assembly election: Labhpur
Party	Candidate	Votes	%	±%
CPI	Radhanath Chattoraj	14,568	37.73	
Independent	Satyanarayan Bandopadhyaya	12,792	33.13	
INC	Sankar Ranjan Bandopadhyaya	11,247	29.13	
Majority		1,776	4.60	
Turnout		41,639	54.45	
Swing to CPI from Independent		Swing		

=== 1957 ===
1957 West Bengal Legislative Assembly election: Labhpur
Party	Candidate	Votes	%	±%
CPI	Radhanath Chattoraj	15,919	47.07	
INC	Baidyanath Bandopadhyaya	15,327	45.32	
HM	Anadikinkar Roy	2,574	7.61	
Majority		592	1.75	
Turnout		33,820	52.49	
Swing to CPI from INC		Swing		
