= Angar Garia =

Angar Garia Angargoria
- Village
- Location in West Bengal, India
- Coordinates: 23.977464°N 87.595744°E
- Country: India
- State: West Bengal
- District: Birbhum

Population (2011)
  - Total: 4,232

Languages
  - Official: Bengali, English
- Time zone: UTC+5:30 (IST)
- PIN: 731132
- Telephone/STD code: 03462
- Lok Sabha constituency: Birbhum
- Vidhan Sabha constituency: Sainthia
- Website: birbhum.nic.in

Angar Garia (also spelled Angargoria) is a village and gram panchayat in Mohammad Bazar CD Block in Suri Sadar subdivision of Birbhum district.

== Geography ==
Cities and towns in Suri Sadar subdivision of Birbhum district
M: municipal city/ town, CT: census town, R: rural/ urban centre, B: Barrage.
Owing to space constraints in the small map, the actual locations in a larger map may vary slightly

=== CD block HQ ===
The headquarters of Mohammad Bazar CD block are located at Angar Garia.

== Demographics ==
As per the 2011 Census of India, Angar Garia had a total population of 4,232 of which 2,155 (51%) were males and 2,077 (49%) were females. Population below 6 years was 487. The total number of literates in Angar Garia was 2,631 (70.25% of the population over 6 years).

== Economy ==
China clay mines are found in Kharia, Mocdam Nagar, Komarpur, Angargoria and Mohammad Bazar, in Birbhum district. Mining is carried out mainly by the open cast method.

== Transport ==
SH 11, running from Mohammad Bazar and to Ranaghat, passes through Angar Garia.
