= Sainthia Assembly constituency =

Sainthia
- Constituency No. 289 for the West Bengal Legislative Assembly
- Interactive Map Outlining Sainthia Assembly Constituency

Constituency details
- Country: India
- Region: East India
- State: West Bengal
- District: Birbhum
- Lok Sabha constituency: Birbhum
- Established: 2011
- Total electors: 190,038
- Reservation: SC

Member of Legislative Assembly
- 18th West Bengal Legislative Assembly
- Incumbent Krishna Kanta Saha
- Party: BJP
- Alliance: NDA
- Elected year: 2026

Sainthia Assembly constituency is an assembly constituency in Birbhum district in the Indian state of West Bengal. It is reserved for scheduled castes.

== Overview ==
As per orders of the Delimitation Commission, No. 289, Sainthia Assembly constituency (SC) is composed of the following: Sainthia municipality, Banagram, Deriapur, Fulur, Horisara, Hatora and Mathpalsa gram panchayats of Sainthia CD Block, Angar Garia, Bhutura, Charicha, Mohammad Bazar, Deucha and Puranagram gram panchayats of Mohammad Bazar CD Block, and Suri II CD Block.

Sainthia Assembly constituency (SC) is part of No. 42 Birbhum (Lok Sabha constituency).

== Election results ==
=== 2026 ===
2026 West Bengal Legislative Assembly election: Sainthia
Party	Candidate	Votes	%	±%
BJP	Krishna Kanta Saha	115,054	47.71	+4.74
AITC	Nilabati Saha	104,748	43.43	−6.41
CPI(M)	Debu Chunari	9,478	3.93	−0.74
INC	Archana Mondal	4,174	1.73	
NOTA	None of the above	1,551	0.64	−0.15
Majority		10,306	4.28	−2.59
Turnout		241,175	95.54	+8.86
BJP gain from AITC		Swing		

=== 2021 ===
In the 2021 elections, Nilabati Saha of Trinamool Congress defeated her nearest rival, Piya Saha of BJP.

2021 West Bengal Legislative Assembly election: Sainthia
Party	Candidate	Votes	%	±%
AITC	Nilabati Saha	110,572	49.84	
BJP	Piya Saha	95,329	42.97	+30.84
CPI(M)	Mausumi Konai	10,369	4.67	−28.01
BSP	Tarapada Badyakar	2,098	0.95	
NOTA	None of the above	1,742	0.79	
Majority		15,243	6.87	
Turnout		221,866	86.68	
AITC hold		Swing		

=== 2016 ===
In the 2016 elections, Nilabati Saha of Trinamool Congress defeated her nearest rival, Dhiren Bagdi of CPI (M).

West Bengal assembly elections, 2016: Sainthia
Party	Candidate	Votes	%	±%
AITC	Nilabati Saha	103,376	52.17	+7.88
CPI(M)	Dhiren Bagdi	64,765	32.68	−14.23
BJP	Piya Saha	24,029	12.13	+6.81
NOTA	None of the above	2,599	1.31	
Independent	Paban Kumar Bagdi	1,860	0.94	
SUCI(C)	Naba Kumar Das	1,534	0.77	
Turnout		198,163	86.91	−0.05
AITC gain from CPI(M)		Swing		

=== 2011 ===
In the 2011 elections, Dhiren Bagdi of CPI(M) defeated his nearest rival, Parikshit Bala of Trinamool Congress.

West Bengal assembly elections, 2011: Sainthia
Party	Candidate	Votes	%	±%
CPI(M)	Dhiren Bagdi	77,512	46.91	−6.83#
AITC	Parikhit Bala	73,194	44.29	+1.13#
BJP	Shibnath Saha	8,786	5.32	
Independent	Madan Chandra Dhuli	5,761	3.49	
Turnout		165,253	86.96	
CPI(M) hold		Swing	-7.46#	

.# Swing calculated on Congress+Trinamool Congress vote percentages taken together, as well as the CPI(M) vote percentage that year, for the now-defunct Mahammad Bazar constituency in 2006.
