= Ulpahari =

- village
- Location in West Bengal, India Ulpahari (India)
- Coordinates: 24.0882405°N 87.664280°E

Ulpahari is a tribal village in Birbhum district, West Bengal, India.

== About ==
Santhals are living here for 200 years. There are approx 76 families living here. This village is located inside the forest, and Santhals have realised that they can make a living by selling plates (thalis/"tharis") made of sal leaves. There is a primary school named "Ulpahari primary school" at ulpahari. It is under "Birbhum District Primary school council".

== Culture ==
Santhals are mainly an austric tribe. They use santhali dialect in their village, but when they come to a "diku" (not santhal) village they use Bengali language. They call themselves (i.e. santhal) -"Hor". Ulpahari is a village with poor inhabitants. They have an ancient culture. They celebrate many festivals like Baha parab, Karam, Bandna etc. Usually they drink homemade wine -Hariya, which made by mahuaflower/rice/yeast/gur etc. at their festivals or daily life.

== Shivpahari ==
Shivpahari is a place of Ulpahari. Here an old shivlingam of Jayadratha is situated. The shivalinga is the contemporary of Mahabharata. Kalapahad had cut the shivalinga into pieces Here Jayadratha had meditated for months in front of the four-foot shivlingam. His father had given him a boon wherein the one who 'dropped his head on the ground' would combust his head with hundreds pieces. In the Kurukshetra battle, Arjuna had cut Jayadratha's head with half-moon shaped arrow. Jayadrath's head went flying and landed on the lap of his father Vridhakshatra, a rishi, who, shocked by the sight of his son's head, dropped it on the ground. He was immediately reduced to ashes.

== Social and religious life ==
Residents of Ulpahari are all santhals. They have no temple but have an altar at the village. They even worship saraswati, kali etc. Hindu gods. They follow the Sarna religion along with Hinduism. They believe at Marangburu, Jaheraera, and Manjhi. Santhals pay respect to the ghosts and spirits like Kal Sing, Lakchera, Beudarang etc. and have village priests known as the naikey and shaman Ujha. Animal sacrifice to the Gods is the common practice among the Santhals to appease the Gods and Goddess.
