= Birbhum Institute of Engineering & Technology =

Engineering college in West Bengal, India

Birbhum Institute of Engineering and Technology
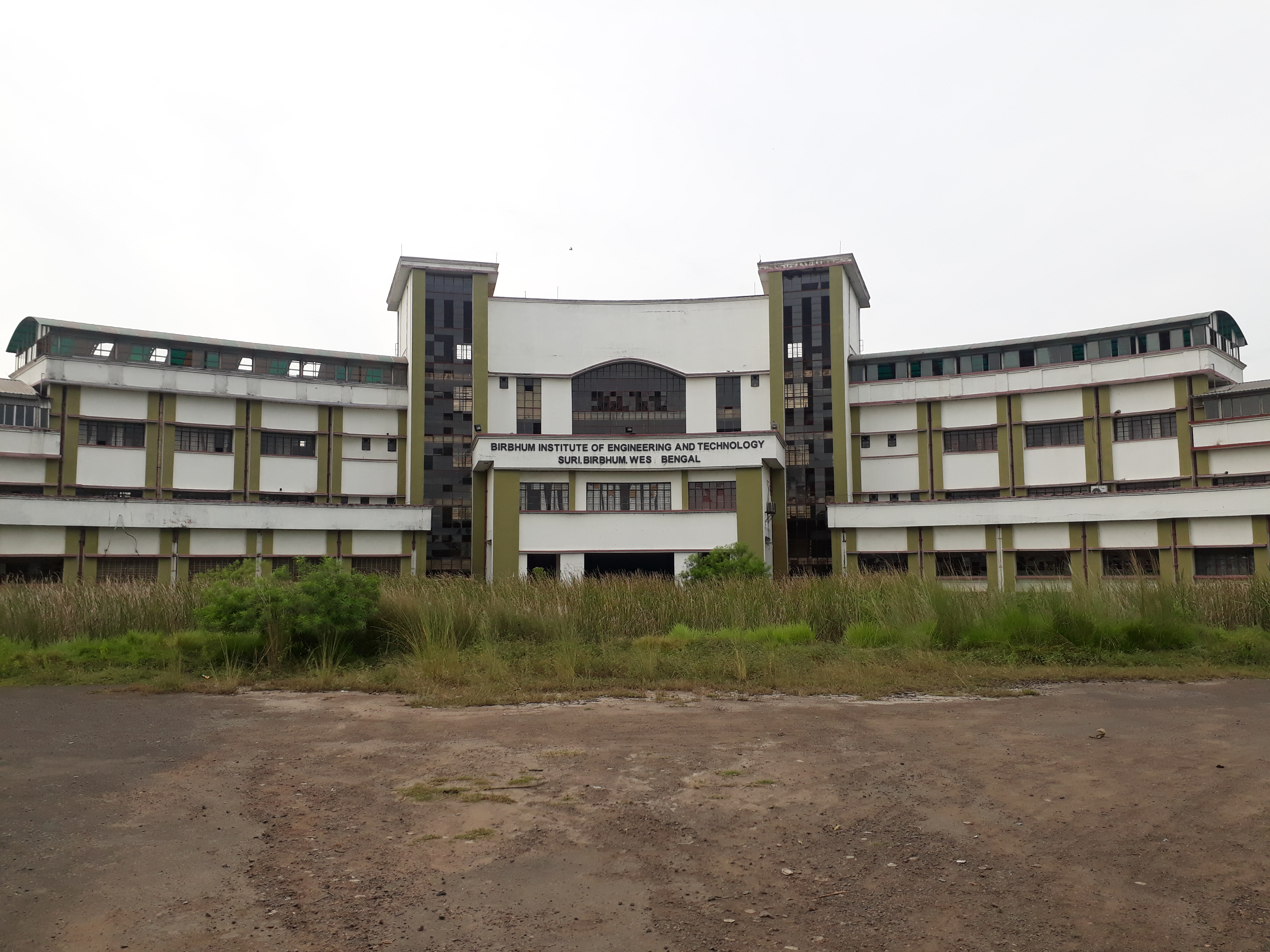
- Other name: BIET
- Type: West Bengal Govt Aided College
- Established: 1999; 27 years ago
- Affiliations: Maulana Abul Kalam Azad University of Technology
- Location: Suri, Birbhum, West Bengal, 731101, India; 23.9354803°N 87.5248736°E
- Campus: Rural
- Approvals: AICTE, NBA for MECHANICAL
- Website: http://www.bietsuri.ac.in
- Location within West Bengal Location within India

Birbhum Institute of Engineering and Technology or BIET is a West Bengal Govt aided engineering college in West Bengal, India. It offers different undergraduate and postgraduate courses in Engineering. It was established in 1999 by an NGO named ICARE under the guidance of educationist Padmashri Late Ramaranjan Mukherji, Ex-President of India and then Finance Minister Shri Pranab Mukherjee and Lok Sabha Speaker Shri Somnath Chatterjee.

The college is affiliated with Maulana Abul Kalam Azad University of Technology and all the relevant programmes are approved by the All India Council for Technical Education and National Board of Accreditation (NBA) for Mechanical Engineering department. The college receives grant from the World Bank under Technical Education Quality Improvement Programme (TEQIP-II), Government of West Bengal, WBMPLAD scheme, Birbhum Zilla Parishad and WBSEDCL.

The campus is located at Suri, Birbhum.

== Academics ==
The institute offers six undergraduate courses:-

- B.Tech in Electronics and Communication Engineering (ECE)- 4 years [Approved intake - 60]
- B.Tech in Electrical Engineering (EE)- 4 years [Approved intake - 60]
- B.Tech in Mechanical Engineering (ME)- 4 years [Approved intake - 120]
- B.Tech in Computer Science and Engineering (CSE)- 4 years [Approved intake - 60]
- B.Tech in Civil Engineering (CE)- 4 years [Approved intake - 120]
- B.Tech in Information Technology (IT)- 4 years [Discontinued]

The institute offers two post-graduate courses:

- M.Tech. in Manufacturing technology- 2 years [Approved intake - 18]
- M.Tech. in Heat power engineering- 2 years [Approved intake - 18]

== See also ==
- List of institutions of higher education in West Bengal
- Education in India
- Education in West Bengal
