= Abhijit Sinha =

Indian politician

Abhijit Sinha (born 1967), also known as Rana, is an Indian politician from West Bengal. He is a member of the West Bengal Legislative Assembly from Labpur Assembly constituency in Birbhum district. He won the 2021 West Bengal Legislative Assembly election representing the All India Trinamool Congress.

== Early life and education ==
Sinha is from Nanoor, Birbhum district, West Bengal. He is the son of late Abhay Prasad Sinha. He completed his post graduate diploma in social work in 1992 at University of Calcutta.

== Career ==
Sinha won from Labpur Assembly constituency representing All India Trinamool Congress in the 2021 West Bengal Legislative Assembly election. He polled 108,423 votes and defeated his nearest rival, Biswajit Mondal of the Bharatiya Janata Party, by a margin of 17,975 votes.
