= Sainthia State General Hospital =

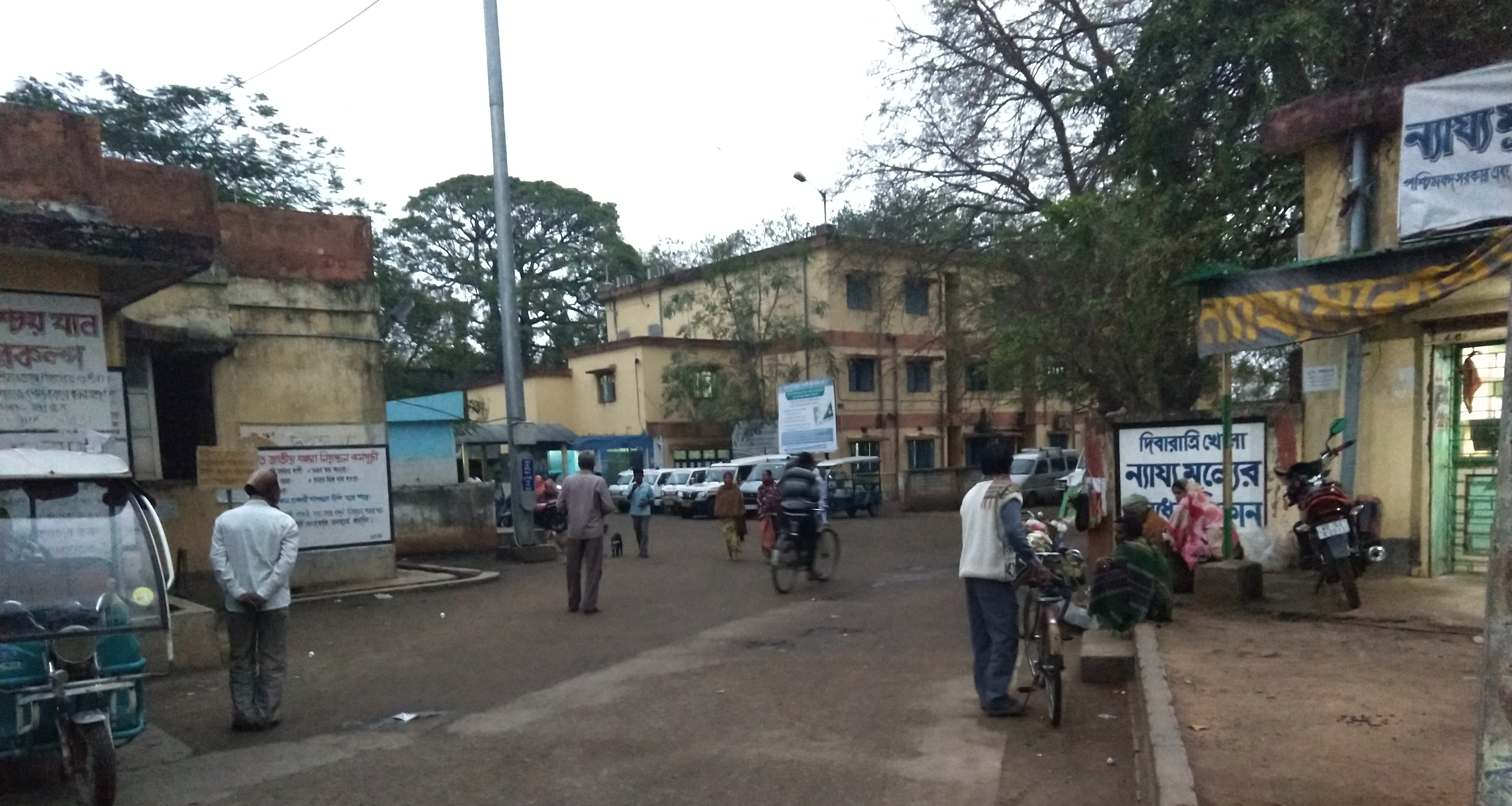
- Sainthia State General Hospital As of February 2019

Geography
- Location: College Road, Sainthia, West Bengal, India
- Coordinates: 23.9479811°N 87.6838562°E

Services
- Emergency department: Yes
- Beds: 100

History
- Founded: 1919 (107 years ago)

Links
- Lists: Hospitals in India

The Sainthia State General Hospital is the main hospital in Sainthia city. It is a 100 bedded government funded hospital. This State General Hospital serves the entire Sainthia city but not only the Santhia city area, people from Kundola, Kotasur, Mayureswar and Labhpur are also dependent on this hospital.

== History ==
According to the Health Department and local sources, the hospital was started as a dispensary with the help of well-educated local people in the year 1919. The dispensary was promoted to the Block Primary Health Center in the year 1985. In 2001, the Block Primary Health Center was promoted to a 60 bedded RH or "Rural Hospital". The SGH or "State General Hospital" status is received in 2019.
