= Rajnagar, Birbhum =

Rajnagar
- Census Town
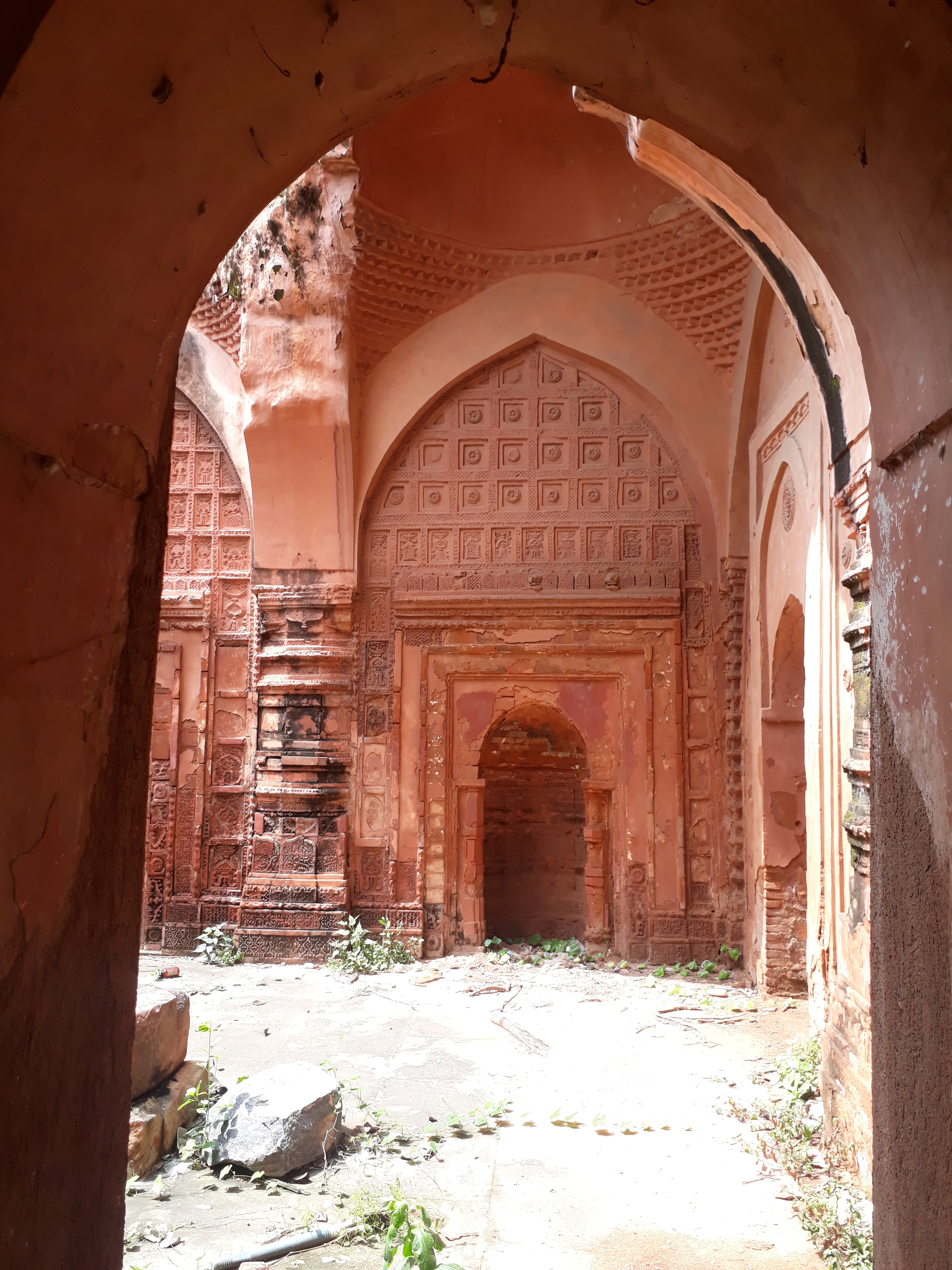
- Rajnagar Motichur Mosque

- Location in West Bengal, India Rajnagar (India)
- Coordinates: 23.95°N 87.32°E
- Country: India
- State: West Bengal
- District: Birbhum
- Elevation: 101 m (331 ft)

Population (2011)
  - Total: 13,965

Languages
  - Official: Bengali, English
- Time zone: UTC+5:30 (IST)
- PIN: 731130
- Telephone code: 03462
- Vehicle registration: WB
- Sex ratio: 961 ♂/♀
- Lok Sabha constituency: Birbhum
- Vidhan Sabha constituency: Suri
- Website: birbhum.nic.in

Rajnagar is a census town situated in the Rajnagar CD block within the Suri Sadar subdivision of Birbhum district in the Indian state of West Bengal. Once the capital of Royal Kingdoms in the area, Rajnagar's significance declined with the fading away of the kingdoms.

== History ==
Founded by Bir Singh, a Hindu Raja, Rajnagar fell under the control of Muhammad Shiran and Ali Mardan in the early 13th century. The district eventually came under Mughal administration, with the later Muslim Zamindars of Rajnagar, known as "Nagar Raj," being feudatories of the Mughals. The decline of the Nagar Raj began in the mid-18th century, marked by battles with the British and Marathas.

=== Nagar Raj ===
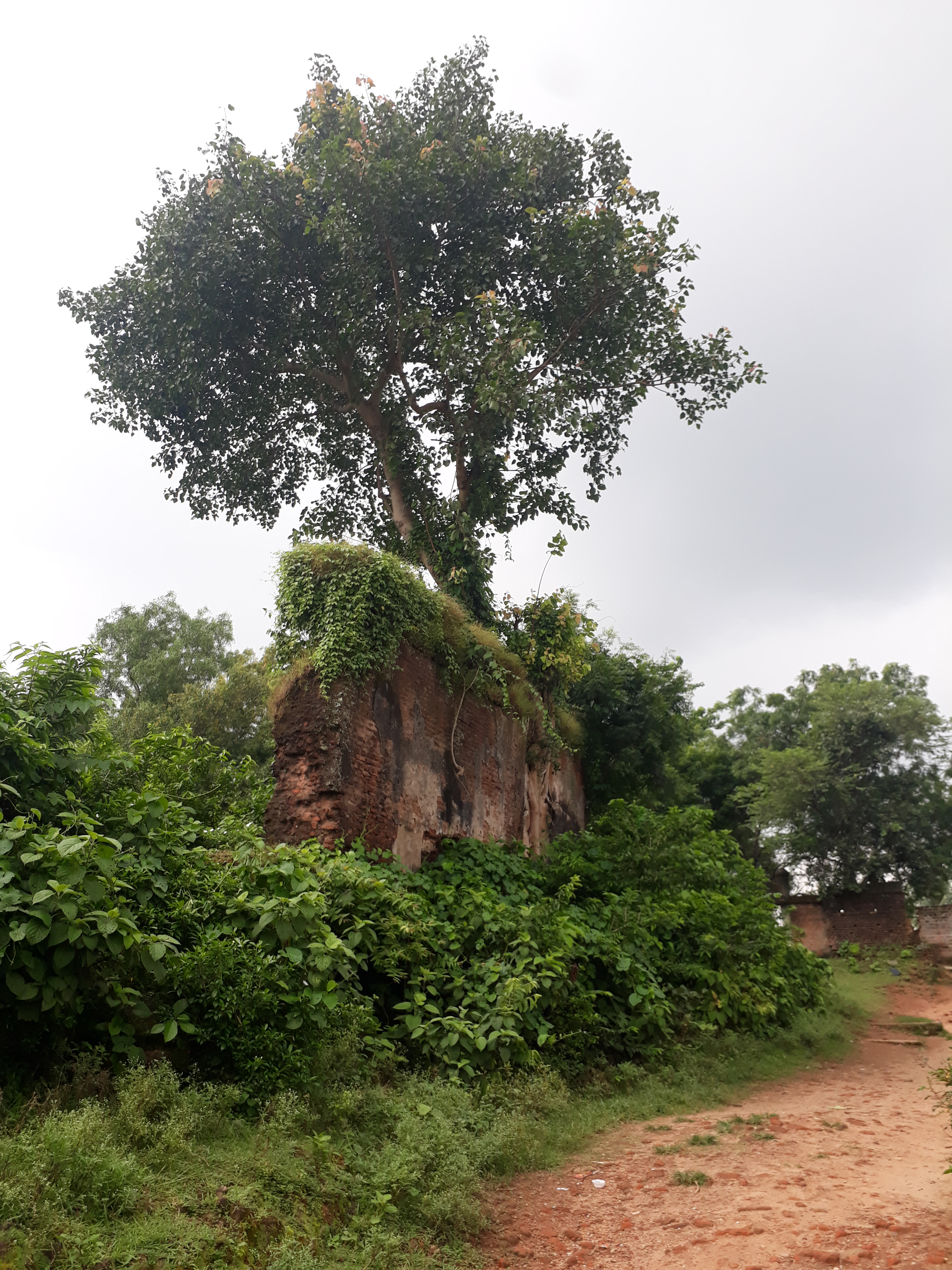
Rajnagar Raj Palace in a ruined condition

Established by Jonad Khan in 1600, the Nagar Raj witnessed a period of autonomy during the rule of Asadullah Khan. However, subsequent rulers faced challenges, and by the early 19th century, Rajnagar had become a deserted town with dilapidated palaces and ruins.

His son, Badi-uz-zaman Khan (1718–1752) made an abortive attempt at shaking off the nominal allegiance to Murshidabad. He was invested with the title of Raja by Murshid Quli Khan. During his reign Birbhum was ravaged by the Marathas. They also overran Rajnagar. It was during the reign of his son, Asad-uz-Zaman Khan (1752–1777) that the Nagar Raj witnessed the zenith of its power and then started declining. The Raja was faithful to the Nawab and after the Battle of Plassey, was on bad terms with the British. He was defeated by the combined forces of the British and Mir Qasim in 1761. He fled, regrouped and fought back again. He was completely routed at the Battle of Hetampur in 1765. By a treaty, he was restored to his estate but much of his autonomy was lost. In the course of time, they lost their supremacy to the Hetampur Raj. The British set up their district headquarters at Suri, and by the early 19th century, Rajnagar had been reduced to a deserted town with dilapidated palaces and ruins of habitation, and the forest slowly encroaching.

=== Nostalgia ===
Despite the decline, the last Pathan ruler, Rafiqul Alam Khan, is still honored as the Raja during Muslim festivals. He wears a royal attire twice a year, connecting the present with the town's historical past.

== Geography ==
Cities and towns in Suri Sadar subdivision of Birbhum district
M: municipal city/ town, CT: census town, R: rural/ urban centre, B: Barrage.
Owing to space constraints in the small map, the actual locations in a larger map may vary slightly

=== Location ===
Rajnagar is located at 23.95°N 87.32°E, with an average elevation of 101 m. It sits on ancient Archean rocks, receiving an annual rainfall of 1405 mm. The area has laterite soil, unsuitable for agriculture.

Suri, 25 km away, is connected by a road.

=== Police station ===
Rajnagar police station has jurisdiction over Rajnagar CD block.

=== CD block HQ ===
The headquarters of Rajnagar CD block are located at Rajnagar.

== Demographics ==
As per the 2011 Census of India, Rajnagar had a total population of 13,965 of which 7,173 (51%) were males and 6,792 (49%) were females. Population below 6 years was 1,771. The total number of literates in Rajnagar was 8,845 (72.54% of the population over 6 years).

== Infrastructure ==
As per the District Census Handbook 2011, Rajnagar covered an area of 9.4773 km^{2}. It has 7 km roads and open drains. The major source of protected water supply is from bore well pumping. There are 1,923 domestic electric connections. Amongst the medical facilities it has are 3 medicine shops. Amongst the educational facilities it has are 7 primary schools, 1 secondary school and 1 senior secondary school. Amongst the recreational and cultural facilities it has 3 cinema theatres, 1 public library and 1 reading room. It has branches of 1 nationalised bank, 1 private commercial bank and 1 agricultural credit society. Amongst the commodities it produces are wooden furniture, lead industry and bamboo products.

== Economy ==
Proximity to the supply centres of raw material, as well as the royal court and an aristocratic community, gave rise to certain centres of cottage industries for cotton and tasar silk in the Tantipara-Bhabanipur-Karidhya zone. The famine of 1770 left both agriculture and industry in a bad shape. Trade also suffered. People had sunk to a depth of poverty which the magistrate of Birbhum emphatically said he had not seen anywhere in India. The Maratha raids of 1742-45 had earlier laid waste not only the countryside but also Rajnagar itself.

== Transport ==
=== Railway ===
The nearest railway station is Siuri.

=== Road ===
The State Highway 6 originates from Rajnagar. Buses are available in the town for larger cities like Suri, Bolpur etc.

== Education ==
- Rajnagar Mahavidyalaya
- Rajnagar High School
- Rajnagar Govt ITI

== Culture ==
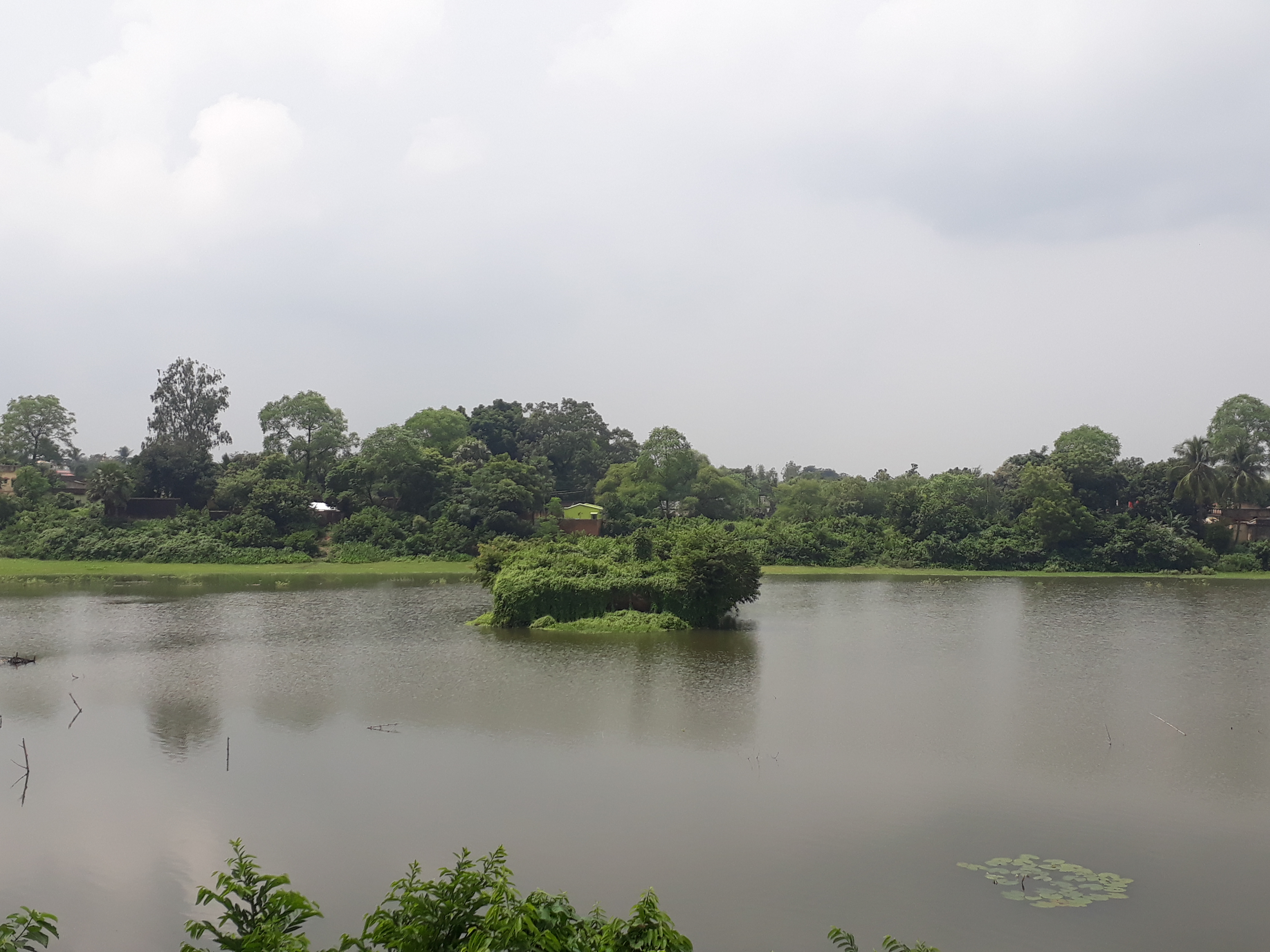
Kalidaha

=== Places of interest ===
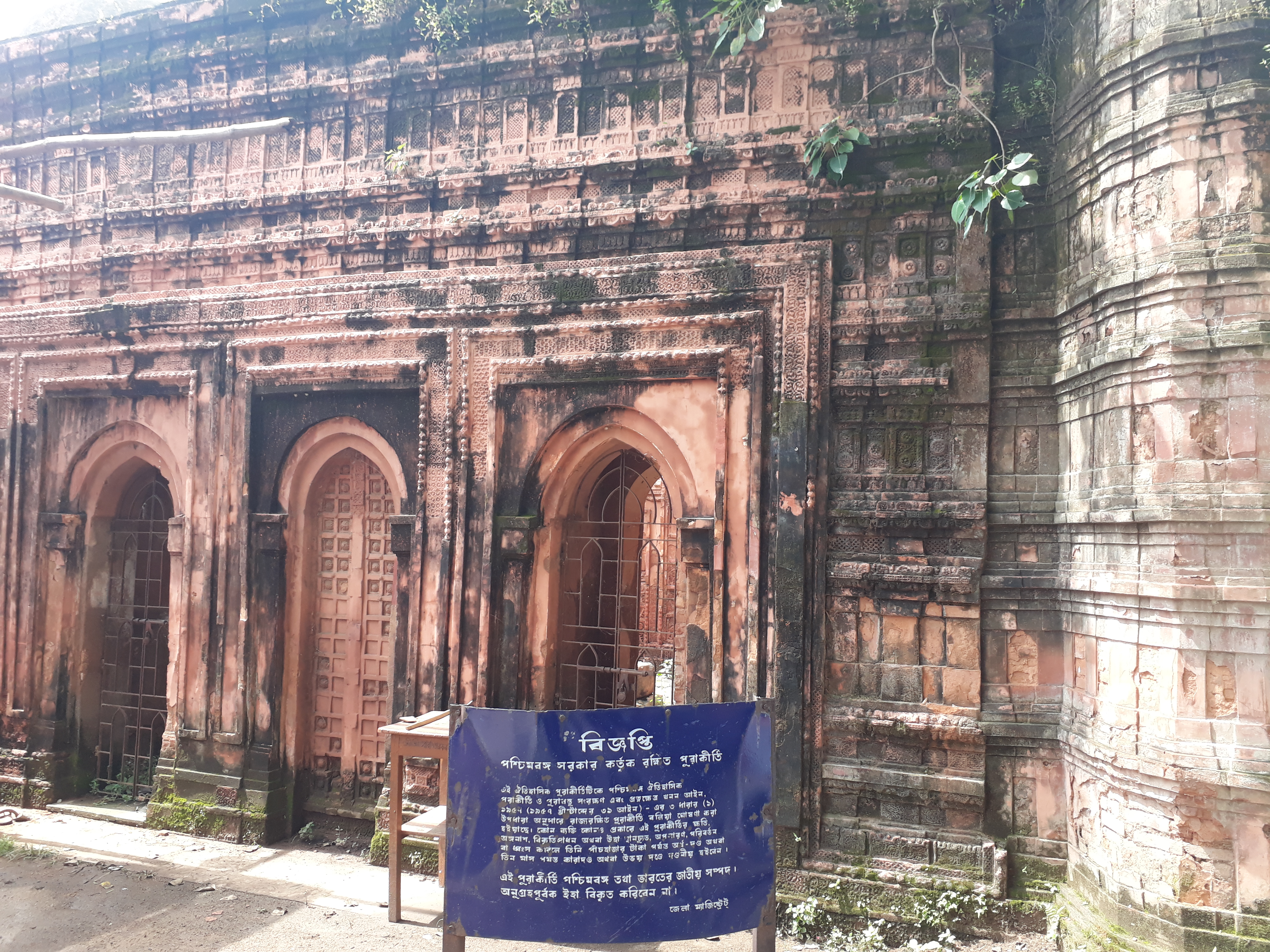
Motichur Terracotta mosque at Rajnagar

Kalidaha, a pond, is said to have been excavated by Hindu Rajas and dedicated to goddess Kali. There is an island in the middle of the pond. It is believed to have been connected with the palace through a tunnel. On three sides of Kalidaha tank there are the wings of the former palaces of Muslim Rajas. In front of the ruins of the Imambara stands a fine Mosque in a state of good preservation, which is still used by local Muslims. A little to the south are the ruins of another old mosque called the Motichur Masjid which had 12 towers but some have fallen down. This mosque was built of Terracotta and protected by Government of West Bengal. Other important sites to be mentioned are 'Nahabatkhana' of the Bir Rajas, and Fulbagan burial place of the Muslim Rajas.

=== Craft ===
The National Institute of Fashion Technology has trained almost 2000 artisans from various parts of Birbhum in handicraft and handloom as a part of its consolidated cluster development project undertaken in collaboration with the ministry of rural development and its counterpart in the state. Estimated at Rs. 15 crore this project is underway in five selected parts of the country. The main project in the eastern zone was implemented in Bolpur, Nalhati, Ilambazar and Rajnagar.
