= Khoyrasol =

- Village
- Location in West Bengal, India
- Coordinates: 23.7901°N 87.2655°E
- Country: India
- State: West Bengal
- District: Birbhum

Population (2021)
  - Total: 5,000 more than equal to

Languages
  - Official: Bengali, English
- Time zone: UTC+5:30 (IST)
- PIN: 731125 (Khoyrasol)
- Telephone/STD code: 03462
- Lok Sabha constituency: Birbhum
- Vidhan Sabha constituency: Dubrajpur
- Website: birbhum.nic.in

Khoyrasol (also spelled Khayrashoal, Khoyrasole) is a village in Khoyrasol CD Block in Suri Sadar subdivision of Birbhum district in the Indian state of West Bengal.

== Geography ==
Cities and towns in Suri Sadar subdivision of Birbhum district
M: municipal city/ town, CT: census town, R: rural/ urban centre, B: Barrage.
Owing to space constraints in the small map, the actual locations in a larger map may vary slightly

=== Police station ===
Khoyrasol police station has jurisdiction over a part of Khoyrasol CD block.

=== CD block HQ ===
The headquarters of Khoyrasol CD block are located at Khoyrasol.

== Demographics ==
As per the 2011 Census of India, Khayrashoal had a total population of 3,313 of which 1,709 (52%) were males and 1,604 (48%) were females. Population below 6 years was 334. The total number of literates in Khayrashoal was 2,214 (74.32% of the population over 6 years).

== Transport ==
Panchra-Khoyrasol Road links Khoyrasol to NH 14 at Panchra.

== Post Office ==
Khoyrasol has a delivery sub post office, with PIN 731125, under Suri head office. Branch offices with the same PIN are Babuijore, Barhra, Bhadulia, Geruapahari, Hazratpur, Jahidpur, Kankartala, Kendragoria, Nabasan, Nakrakonda, Pursundi, Rasa and Sagarbhanga.

== Education ==
Sailajananda Falguni Smriti Mahavidyalaya was established at Khoyrasol in 1998. Affiliated to the University of Burdwan, it conducts under-graduate courses in arts.

== Culture ==
Khoyrasol Milan Sangha Gramin Pathagar, a government-sponsored library, was established in 1951. It has its own pucca building.
