= Bakreswar Thermal Power Plant Township =

- Industrial Town
- Location in West Bengal, India
- Coordinates: 23.8353°N 87.4633°E
- Country: India
- State: West Bengal
- District: Birbhum

Languages
  - Official: Bengali, English
- Time zone: UTC+5:30 (IST)
- PIN: 731102 (Bhurkuna)
- Telephone/STD code: 0346
- Lok Sabha constituency: Birbhum
- Vidhan Sabha constituency: Suri
- Website: birbhum.nic.in

Bakreswar Thermal Power Plant Township is an industrial township in Suri I block in Suri Sadar subdivision of Birbhum district in the Indian state of West Bengal

== Geography ==
Cities and towns in Suri Sadar subdivision of Birbhum district
M: municipal city/ town, CT: census town, R: rural/ urban centre, B: Barrage.
Owing to space constraints in the small map, the actual locations in a larger map may vary slightly

=== Location ===
Bakreshwar Thermal Power Station, along with the industrial township, are spread across parts of Suri I and Dubrajpur blocks. Small villages, such as Bangaon and Sadaipur, are located in the area. Larger villages, such as Chinpai and Kachujor, are located nearby.

=== Police station ===
Sadaipur police station has jurisdiction over Suri I block.

=== Neel Nirjan ===
The reservoir, formed by erecting a dam in the Bakreshwar River, named Neel Nirjan (meaning blue solitude), for providing water to the thermal power plant, is gaining in popularity as a tourist spot.{It can be seen on the map alongside, but it is not marked.)

== Economy ==
The 1,050 MW Bakreshwar Thermal Power Station of West Bengal Power Development Corporation Limited, was commissioned between 1999 and 2009.

== Transport ==
NH 14 (old numbering NH 60), running from Moregram (in Murshidabad district) to Kharagpur (in Paschim Medinipur district), passes through the area. The portion of the highway passing through this area was earlier known as Panagarh-Morgram Highway

The Andal-Sainthia branch line passes through this area. There are stations at Chinpai and Kachujor.

== Education ==
BKTPP Prabir Sengupta Vidyalaya is a co-ed higher secondary school located in the township. Established in 1997, the school follows the course curricula of West Bengal Board of Secondary Education (WBBSE) and West Bengal Council of Higher Secondary Education (WBCHSE) for Standard 10th and 12th Board examinations respectively.
