= Banalakshmi =

Banalakshmi (Bengali: বনলক্ষ্মী) or "Vanalakshmi Unmesh Samiti" is a Krishi Ashram and a small NGO in the Birbhum district of West Bengal. It is located near to the Santiniketan, the education centre set up by Rabindranath Tagore. It is connected by a highway to Ilambazar and Bolpur. The bus stop name is Banabhila (Bengali: বনভিলা). The Choupahari sal forests (Bengali: চৌপাহাড়ীর জঙ্গল) or commonly known as Ilambazar forests (Bengali: ইলামবাজার জঙ্গল) starts from here. Address is Vanalakshmi Unmesh Samiti, Banabhila, P.O. Dwaranda (via Sriniketan P.O.), Birbhum-731236. It is around 13/14 km towards Ilambazar from Shantiniketan.

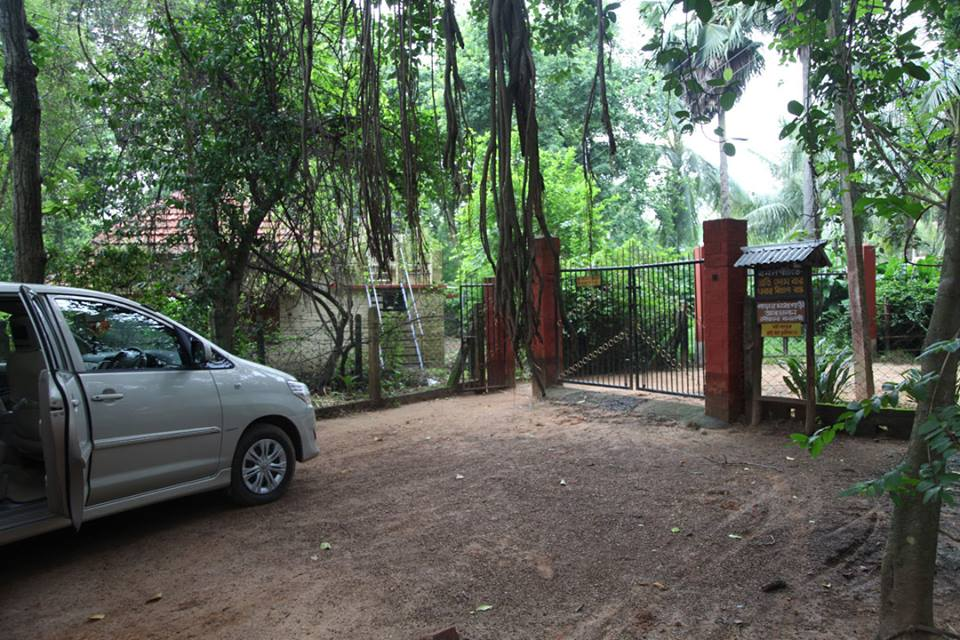
Banalakshmi entrance

== History ==
The word 'Banalakshmi' literally means the richness (Lakshmi) of forest (Bana) (nature in general). It is the brainchild of Niranjan Sanyal who first conceived the idea of a natural paradise on barren lands of Birbhum in 1963. Bonani Chakraborty joined with him to carry forward this idea and his dream. The idea was that it would evolve like an ecosphere—bettering the life of people by optimum utilization of natural resources. In 1964 Dr. Parbati Bhattacharyya joined with his mission and devoted her life to Banalakshmi. Later Sumitra Sinha from Vishwabharati University in neighbouring Santiniketan, joined Banalakshmi. She was inspired by Niranjan babu. There were two others too, Kannan Paul (a trained nurse) and her brother Mrinal Paul, both were brought by Mr. Sanyal, Bonani Chakraborty and her sister from Kundagaon (near Jagdalpur) in undivided Madhya Pradesh and joined Banalakshmi within a few years time. Since its inception, when it was completely devoid of any vegetation, it has been continuously growing and today it is a large green reserve and a center for rural development.

== Vegetation ==
It is spread over an estimated area of 40 bigha (around 13 acres). It has vegetation grown on laterite soil which is the abundant red soil variety found in Birbhum. It has large forested tracts, orchards of various fruits—like mango and guava—and multiple crop cultivation the year round. The road leading to Banalakshmi is also lined by dense to sporadic occurrence of tropical deciduous trees like sal and eucalyptus.

== Economy ==
It is a center of a small cottage industry. Various products like honey, squash and handicrafts are prepared and sold. It is also a tourist destination in the district.
