= Ajoypur =

- Village
- Location in West Bengal, India Ajoypur (India)
- Coordinates: 23.912833°N 87.493889°E
- Country: India
- State: West Bengal
- District: Birbhum

Population (2011)
  - Total: 903

Languages
  - Official: Bengali, English
- Time zone: UTC+5:30 (IST)
- PIN: 731103 (Ajoypur)
- Lok Sabha constituency: 42. Birbhum
- Vidhan Sabha constituency: Suri

Ajoypur is a village located in Suri I Block in the Birbhum district in the state of West Bengal, India.
