= Suri II =

- Community development block
- Location in West Bengal
- Coordinates: 23°51′19″N 87°34′31″E
- Country: India
- State: West Bengal
- District: Birbhum
- Parliamentary constituency: Birbhum
- Assembly constituency: Sainthia

Area
  - Total: 135.81 km^{2} (52.44 sq mi)

Population (2011)
  - Total: 87,405
  - Density: 643.58/km^{2} (1,666.9/sq mi)
- Time zone: UTC+5.30 (IST)
- Literacy Rate: 72.75 per cent
- Website: http://birbhum.nic.in/

Suri II is a community development block that forms an administrative division in Suri Sadar subdivision of Birbhum district in the Indian state of West Bengal.

== Overview ==
Birbhum district is physiographically a part of the ancient Rarh region. The western portion of the district is basically an extension of the Chota Nagpur Plateau. The area has mostly loose reddish lateritic low fertility soil. In the east, the flood plains of the major rivers, such as the Ajay, Bakreshwar, Mayurakshi and Brahmani, have soft alluvial soil. The forest cover is only 3.5% of the total district. Although coal is found in the district and Bakreshwar Thermal Power Station has a capacity of 2,010 MW, the economic condition of Birbhum is dominated by agriculture. From 1977 onwards majorland reforms took place in West Bengal. Land in excess of land ceiling was acquired and distributed amongst the peasants. In Birbhum district, 19,968 hectares of vested agricultural land has been distributed amongst 161,515 beneficiaries, till 2011. However, more than 38% of the operational land holding is marginal or less than 1 acre. The proportion of agricultural labourers amongst total workers in Birbhum district is 45.9%, the highest amongst all districts of West Bengal. Culturally rich Birbhum, with such traditional landmarks as Jaydev Kenduli and Chandidas Nanoor, is home to Visva-Bharati University at Santiniketan, having close association with two Nobel laureates – Rabindranath Tagore and Amartya Sen.

== Geography ==
Map of Birbhum district showing CD blocks and municipal areas. Click on the map to view larger map.

Purandarpur is located at 23°51′19″N 87°34′31″E.

Suri II CD Block is part of the Suri-Bolpur Plain, one of the four sub-micro physiographic regions of Birbhum district. It covers the interfluves of the Mayurakshi and Ajay rivers, in the south-eastern part of the district. This area exhibits somewhat upland topography sloping from north-west to south-east.

Suri II CD Block is bounded by Suri I CD Block on the north, Sainthia CD Block on the east, Ilambazar CD Block on the south and Dubrajpur and Suri I CD Blocks on the west.

Suri II CD Block has an area of 135.81 km^{2}. It has 1 panchayat samity, 6 gram panchayats, 52 gram sansads (village councils), 95 mouzas and 85 inhabited villages. Panrui police station serves this block. Headquarters of this CD Block is at Purandarpur.

Gram panchayats of Suri II block/panchayat samiti are: Abinashpur, Bansanka, Domdoma, Kendua, Koma and Purandarpur.

== Demographics ==
=== Population ===
As per the 2011 Census of India, Suri II CD Block had a total population of 87,405, all of which were rural. There were 44,921 (51%) males and 42,484 (49%) females. Population below 6 years was 10,747. Scheduled Castes numbered 28,649 (32.78%) and Scheduled Tribes numbered 11,682 (13.37%).

As per 2001 census, Suri II block had a total population of 77,002, out of which 39,631 were males and 37,371 were females. Suri II block registered a population growth of 18.19 per cent during the 1991-2001 decade. Decadal growth for Birbhum district was 17.88 per cent. Decadal growth in West Bengal was 17.84 per cent.

Large village (with 4,000+ population) in Suri II CD Block is (2011 census figure in brackets): Purandarpur (4,566).

Other villages in Suri II CD Block include (2011 census figures in brackets): Kendua (3,309), Banshanka (1,838), Abinashpur (1,846), Koma (1,269) and Damdam (2,448).

=== Literacy ===
As per the 2011 census the total number of literates in Suri II CD Block was 55,765 (72.75% of the population over 6 years) out of which males numbered 31,177 (79.12% of the male population over 6 years) and females numbered 24,588 (66.00% of the female population over 6 years). The gender disparity (the difference between female and male literacy rates) was 13.12%.

See also – List of West Bengal districts ranked by literacy rate

Literacy in CD blocks of
Birbhum district
Rampurhat subdivision
Murarai I – 55.67%
Murarai II – 58.28%
Nalhati I – 69.83%
Nalhati II – 71.68%
Rampurhat I – 73.29%
Rampurhat II – 70.77%
Mayureswar I – 71.52%
Mayureswar II – 70.89%
Suri Sadar subdivision
Mohammad Bazar – 65.18%
Rajnagar – 68.10%
Suri I – 72.75%
Suri II – 72.75%
Sainthia – 72.33%
Dubrajpur – 68.26%
Khoyrasol – 68.75%
Bolpur subdivision
Bolpur Sriniketan – 70.67%
Ilambazar – 74.27%
Labpur – 71.20%
Nanoor – 69.45%
2011 Census: CD Block Wise

Primary Census Abstract Data

=== Language and religion ===
Religion in Suri II CD block (2011)
Hinduism	67.70%
Islam	31.59%
Other or not stated	0.71%

In the 2011 census, Hindus numbered 59,173 and formed 67.70% of the population in Suri II CD Block. Muslims numbered 27,612 and formed 31.59% of the population. Christians numbered 233 and formed 0.27% of the population. Others numbered 387 and formed 0.44% of the population.

The proportion of Hindus in Birbhum district has declined from 72.2% in 1961 to 62.3% in 2011. The proportion of Muslims in Birbhum district has increased from 27.6% to 37.1% during the same period. Christians formed 0.3% in 2011.

Languages in Suri II CD block (2011)
1. Bengali (88.3%)
2. Santali (11.0%)
3. Others (0.74%)

At the time of the 2011 census, 88.29% of the population spoke Bengali and 10.97% Santali as their first language.

== Rural poverty ==
As per the BPL household survey carried out in 2005, the proportion of BPL households in Suri II CD Block was 50.6%, against 42.3% in Birbhum district. In six CD Blocks – Murarai II, Nalhati II, Rampurhat II, Rampurhat I, Suri II and Murarai I – the proportion of BPL families was more than 50%. In three CD Blocks – Rajnagar, Suri I and Labhpur – the proportion of BPL families was less than 30%. The other ten CD Blocks in Birbhum district were placed in between. According to the District Human Development Report, Birbhum, "Although there is no indication that the share of BPL households is more in blocks with higher share of agricultural labourer, there is a clear pattern that the share of BPL households is more in blocks with disadvantaged population in general and Muslim population in particular." (The disadvantaged population includes SCs, STs and Muslims.)

== Economy ==
=== Livelihood ===
Livelihood
in Suri II CD Block
1. Cultivators (14.4%)
2. Agricultural labourers (58.6%)
3. Household industries (3.44%)
4. Other Workers (23.6%)

In Suri II CD Block in 2011, amongst the class of total workers, cultivators numbered 5,224 and formed 14.40%, agricultural labourers numbered 21,257 and formed 58.60%, household industry workers numbered 1,248 and formed 3.44% and other workers numbered 8,546 and formed 23.56%. Total workers numbered 36,275 and formed 41.50% of the total population, and non-workers numbered 51,130 and formed 58.50% of the population.

Note: In the census records a person is considered a cultivator, if the person is engaged in cultivation/ supervision of land owned by self/government/institution. When a person who works on another person's land for wages in cash or kind or share, is regarded as an agricultural labourer. Household industry is defined as an industry conducted by one or more members of the family within the household or village, and one that does not qualify for registration as a factory under the Factories Act. Other workers are persons engaged in some economic activity other than cultivators, agricultural labourers and household workers. It includes factory, mining, plantation, transport and office workers, those engaged in business and commerce, teacher s, entertainment artistes and so on.

=== Infrastructure ===
There are 85 inhabited villages in Suri II CD Block, as per District Census Handbook, Birbhum, 2011. 100% villages have power supply. 85 villages (100%) have drinking water supply. 12 villages (14.12%) have post offices. 85 villages (100%) have telephones (including landlines, public call offices and mobile phones). 35 villages (41.18%) have a pucca (paved) approach road and 28 villages (32.94%) have transport communication (includes bus service, rail facility and navigable waterways). 13 villages (15.29%) have agricultural credit societies and 4 villages (4.71%) have banks.

=== Agriculture ===
Following land reforms land ownership pattern has undergone transformation. In 2004–05 (the agricultural labourer data is for 2001), persons engaged in agriculture in Suri II CD Block could be classified as follows: bargadars 3,502 (10.50%), patta (document) holders 3,897 (11.68%), small farmers (possessing land between 1 and 2 hectares) 4,858 (14.56%), marginal farmers (possessing land up to 1 hectare) 5,758 (17.26%) and agricultural labourers 15,348 (46.00%).

Birbhum is a predominantly paddy cultivation-based agricultural district. The area under paddy cultivation in 2010-11 was 249,000 hectares of land. Paddy is grown in do, suna and sali classes of land. There is double to triple cropping system for paddy cultivation. Other crops grown in Birbhum are gram, masuri, peas, wheat, linseed, khesari, til, sugarcane and occasionally cotton. 192,470 hectares of cultivable land is under irrigation by different sources, such as canals, tanks, river lift irrigation and different types of tubewells. In 2009–10, 158,380 hectares were irrigated by canal water. There are such major irrigation projects as Mayurakshi and Hijli. Other rivers such as Ajoy, Brahmani, Kuskurni, Dwaraka, Hingla and Kopai are also helpful for irrigation in the district.

In 2013–14, there were 17 fertiliser depots, 5 seed stores and 23 fair price shops in Suri II CD block.

In 2013–14, Suri II CD block produced 4,533 tonnes of Aman paddy, the main winter crop, from 1,655 hectares, 7,195 tonnes of Boro paddy (spring crop) from 2,029 hectares, 1,133 tonnes of wheat from 402 hectares, 7,652 tonnes of potatoes from 265 hectares and 1,197 tonnes of sugar cane from 31 hectares. It also produced pulses and oilseeds.

In 2013–14, the total area irrigated in Suri II CD block was 11,296 hectares, out of which 8,785 hectares were irrigated by canal water, 550 hectares by tank water, 60 hectares by river lift irrigation, 1,845 hectares by deep tube wells and 56 hectares by shallow tube wells.

=== Banking ===
In 2013–14, Suri II CD block had offices of 6 commercial banks and 2 gramin banks.

=== Other sectors ===
According to the District Human Development Report, 2009, Birbhum is one of the most backward districts of West Bengal in terms of industrial development. Of the new industrial projects set-up in West Bengal between 1991 and 2005, only 1.23% came to Birbhum. Bakreshwar Thermal Power Station is the only large-scale industry in the district and employs about 5,000 people. There are 4 medium-scale industries and 4,748 registered small-scale industries.

The proportion of workers engaged in agriculture in Birbhum has been decreasing. According to the District Human Development Report, "more people are now engaged in non-agricultural activities, such as fishing, retail sales, vegetable vending, selling milk, and so on. As all these activities are at the lower end of the spectrum of marketable skills, it remains doubtful if these activities generate enough return for their family’s sustenance."

=== Backward Regions Grant Fund ===
Birbhum district is listed as a backward region and receives financial support from the Backward Regions Grant Fund. The fund, created by the Government of India, is designed to redress regional imbalances in development. As of 2012, 272 districts across the country were listed under this scheme. The list includes 11 districts of West Bengal.

== Transport ==
Suri II CD block has 6 originating/ terminating bus routes.

State Highway 6, running from Rajnagar (in Birbhum district) to Alampur (in Howrah district) passes through Suri II CD Block.

== Education ==
In 2013–14, Suri II CD block had 79 primary schools with 5,509 students, 8 middle schools with 421 students, 7 high schools with 3,538 students and 4 higher secondary schools with 5,044 students. Suri II CD Block had 1 technical/ professional institution with 26 students and 198 institutions for special and non-formal education with 4,737 students. Suri municipal area has 2 general degree colleges (outside the CD block).

As per the 2011 census, in Suri II CD Block, amongst the 85 inhabited villages, 11 villages did not have a school, 18 villages had more than 1 primary school, 10 villages had at least 1 primary and 1 middle school and 13 villages had at least 1 middle and 1 secondary school. 6 villages had senior secondary schools.

== Healthcare ==
In 2014, Suri II CD block had 1 block primary health centre and 2 primary health centres with total 31 beds and 4 doctors (excluding private bodies). It had 14 family welfare subcentres. 1,733 patients were treated indoor and 53,570 patients were treated outdoor in the hospitals, health centres and subcentres of the CD block.

As per 2011 census, in Suri II CD Block, 5 villages had primary health centres, 32 villages had primary health subcentres, 10 villages had maternity and child welfare centres, 1 village had a veterinary hospital, 9 villages had medicine shops and out of the 85 inhabited villages 36 villages had no medical facilities.

Sultanpur Rural Hospital at PO Abinashpur has 30 beds. There are primary health centres at Purandarpur (10 beds) and Patanda (PO Ikra) (6 beds).
