= Abinashpur =

- Village
- Location in West Bengal, India
- Coordinates: 23.817222°N 87.574944°E
- Country: India
- State: West Bengal
- District: Birbhum

Population (2011)
  - Total: 1,846

Languages
  - Official: Bengali, English
- Time zone: UTC+5:30 (IST)
- PIN: 731121 (Abinashpur)
- Telephone code /STD code: 03462
- Lok Sabha constituency: Birbhum
- Vidhan Sabha constituency: Sainthia
- Website: birbhum.nic.in

Abinashpur is a village and gram panchayat in Suri II CD Block in Suri Sadar subdivision of Birbhum district in the Indian state of West Bengal.

== Geography ==
Cities and towns in Suri Sadar subdivision of Birbhum district
M: municipal city/ town, CT: census town, R: rural/ urban centre, B: Barrage.
Owing to space constraints in the small map, the actual locations in a larger map may vary slightly

=== Location ===
Purandarpur, the CD Block headquarters, is 4 km away from Abinashpur. Suri, the district headquarters, is 17 km away.

=== Gram panchayat ===
Villages in Abinashpur gram panchayat are: Abinashpur, Badilpur, Bholaipur, Harishpur, Hatikra, Imadpur, Kasherhat, Kubirpur, Parbatipur, Rajpur, Sekampur and Srikantapur.

== Demographics ==
As per the 2011 Census of India, Abinashpur had a total population of 1,846 of which 915 (50%) were males and 931 (50%) were females. Population below 6 years was 217. The total number of literates in Abinashpur was 1,240 (76.12% of the population over 6 years).

== Education ==
Abinashpur Sriram High School, a Bengali-medium co-educational institution, was established in 1926. It has arrangements for teaching from class VI to class XII. The school has 15 computers and a library with 3,200 books. It is housed in a government building.

== Healthcare ==
Sultanpur Rural Hospital at PO Abinashpur has 30 beds. There are primary health centres at Purandarpur (10 beds) and Patanda (PO Ikra) (6 beds).
