= Kalipur, Birbhum =

Kalipur
- Village
- Location in West Bengal Kalipur (India)
- Coordinates: 23.9048°N 87.5078°E
- Country: India
- State: West Bengal
- District: Birbhum

Area
  - Total: 0.5795 km^{2} (0.2237 sq mi)

Population (2011)
  - Total: 4,770
  - Density: 8,230/km^{2} (21,300/sq mi)

Languages
  - Official: Bengali, English
- Time zone: IST
- PIN: 731126
- Telephone code: 03462
- Lok Sabha constituency: Birbhum
- Vidhan Sabha constituency: Suri
- Website: birbhum.nic.in

Kalipur is a Village in Suri I CD block in Suri Sadar subdivision of Birbhum district, West Bengal, India.

== Geography ==
Cities and towns in Suri Sadar subdivision of Birbhum district
M: municipal city/ town, CT: census town, R: rural/ urban centre, B: Barrage.
Owing to space constraints in the small map, the actual locations in a larger map may vary slightly

=== Location ===
Kalipur is located at 23.9048°N 87.5078°E.

== Demographics ==
As per the 2011 Census of India, Kalipur had a total population of 4,770 of which 2,434 (51%) were males and 2336 (49%) were females. Population below 6 years was 534. The total number of literates in Kalipur was 3,217 (75.94% of the population over 6 years).

== Infrastructure ==
As per the District Census Handbook 2011, Kalipur covered an area of 0.5795 km^{2}. The nearest railway station is at Suri 4 km away. Buses are available in the town. It has 5.5 km roads and open drains. The major source of protected water supply is from bore well pumping and over head tank. There are 1,310 domestic electric connections. Amongst the medical facilities it has are 11 medicine shops. Amongst the educational facilities it has are 2 primary schools, 1 middle school, 1 secondary school and 1 senior secondary school. The nearest general degree college is at Suri. There is a public library and a reading room at Karidhya 0.5 km away. It has the branch of 1 non-agricultural credit society. Amongst the commodities it produces are handloom goods, conch shell products and sal leaf plates.

== Transport ==
Kalipur is on State Highway 6 (locally popular as Saptagram-Tribeni-Kalna-Katwa or STKK Road).
