= Bakreshwar =

- Village
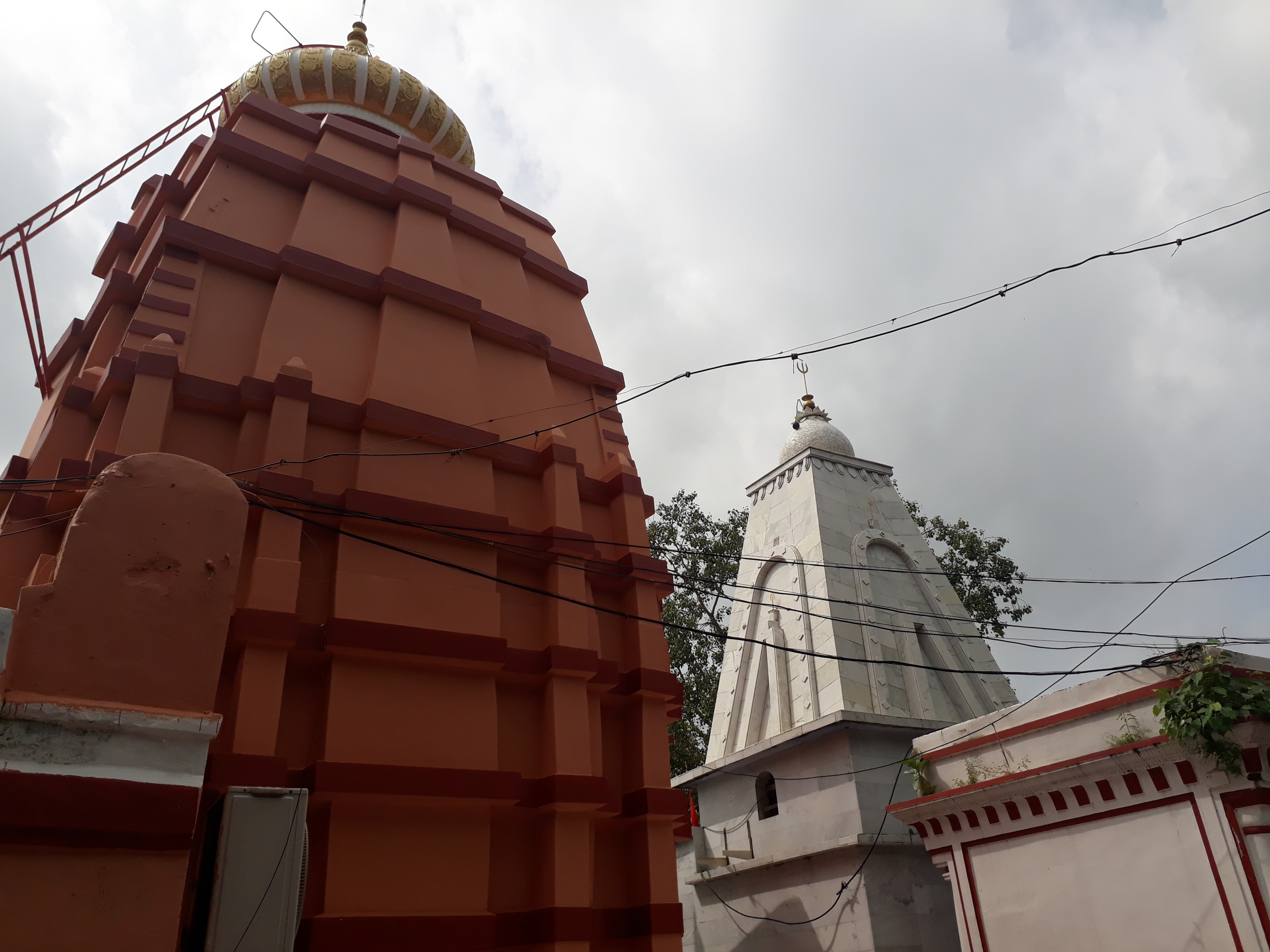
- Bakreshwar temples

- Location in West Bengal, India Bakreshwar (India) Bakreshwar (India)
- Coordinates: 23°52′52.4″N 87°22′35.2″E
- Country: India
- State: West Bengal
- District: Birbhum
- Elevation: 84 m (276 ft)

Languages
  - Official: Bengali
- Time zone: UTC+5:30 (IST)
- Vehicle registration: WB
- Lok Sabha constituency: Birbhum
- Vidhan Sabha constituency: Dubrajpur
- Website: birbhum.nic.in

Bakreshwar is a village in Dubrajpur CD Block in Suri Sadar subdivision of Birbhum district in the Indian state of West Bengal. Bakreshwar Thermal Power Station of West Bengal Power Development Corporation Limited and Bakreswar Thermal Power Plant Township are located some distance away from this town. The nearest railway station of Bakreshwar is Dubrajpur.

== Etymology ==
The word Bakreshwar comes from the name of Lord Shiva worshipped in the locality. Bakra (Vakra) means bent or curved. Ishwar means God. Mythologically it is said that in Satya Yuga during the marriage ceremony of Lakshmi and Narayan, Ashtavakra Muni (then known as Subrata Muni) was insulted by Indra. The muni was so enraged that he developed 8 cripples in his body (Ashtavakra Muni means a sage with 8 curved cripples, probably kyphoscoliotic). Ashtavakra Muni was blessed by lord Shiva here after many years of Tapashya (meditation). This place is also famous as one of the 51 Shakta pithas where there is a temple dedicated to Adi Shakti. This is a major pilgrimage spot for Hindus.

== Geography ==
Cities and towns in Suri Sadar subdivision of Birbhum district
M: municipal city/ town, CT: census town, R: rural/ urban centre, B: Barrage.
Owing to space constraints in the small map, the actual locations in a larger map may vary slightly

=== Location ===
Bakreshwar is located at 23.88°N 87.37°E. It has an average elevation of 84 metres (276 feet).

Bakreshwar River flows beside the town.

== Hot springs and temples ==
Bakreshwar is also a place of geological interest with many hot springs. There are ten hot springs here. These are : Paphara ganga, Baitarini ganga, Khar kunda, Bhairav kunda, Agni kunda, Dudh kunda, Surya kunda, Shwet ganga, Brahma kunda, Amrita kunda.

Temples at Bakreswar:

1. Ma Bhavatarini Mandir
2. Bakreswar Temple
3. Mahisasur Mardini Temple
4. Bhairabnath Temple

== Bakreshwar picture gallery ==
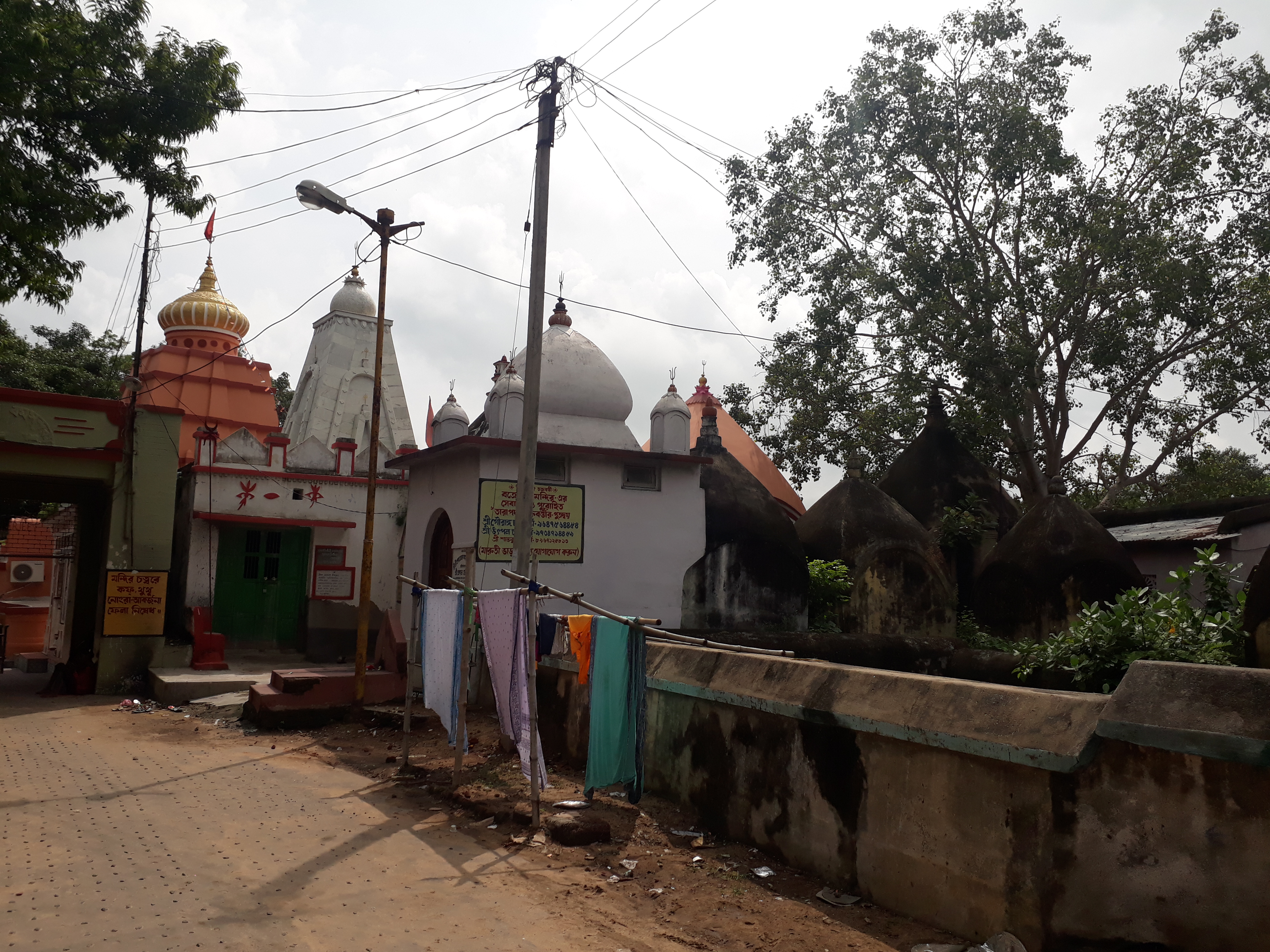
Bakreshwar temples

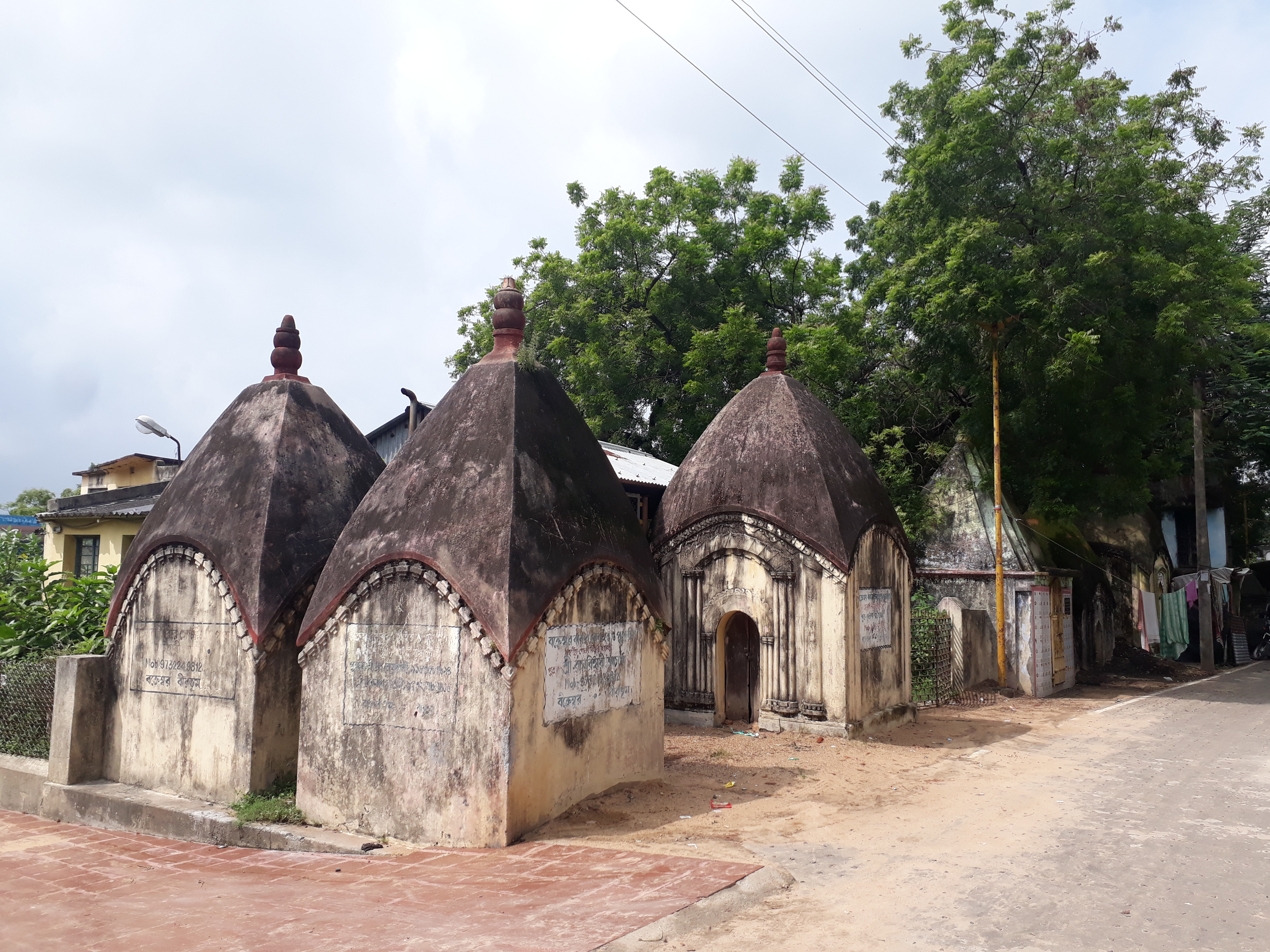
Smaller temples at Bakreshwar

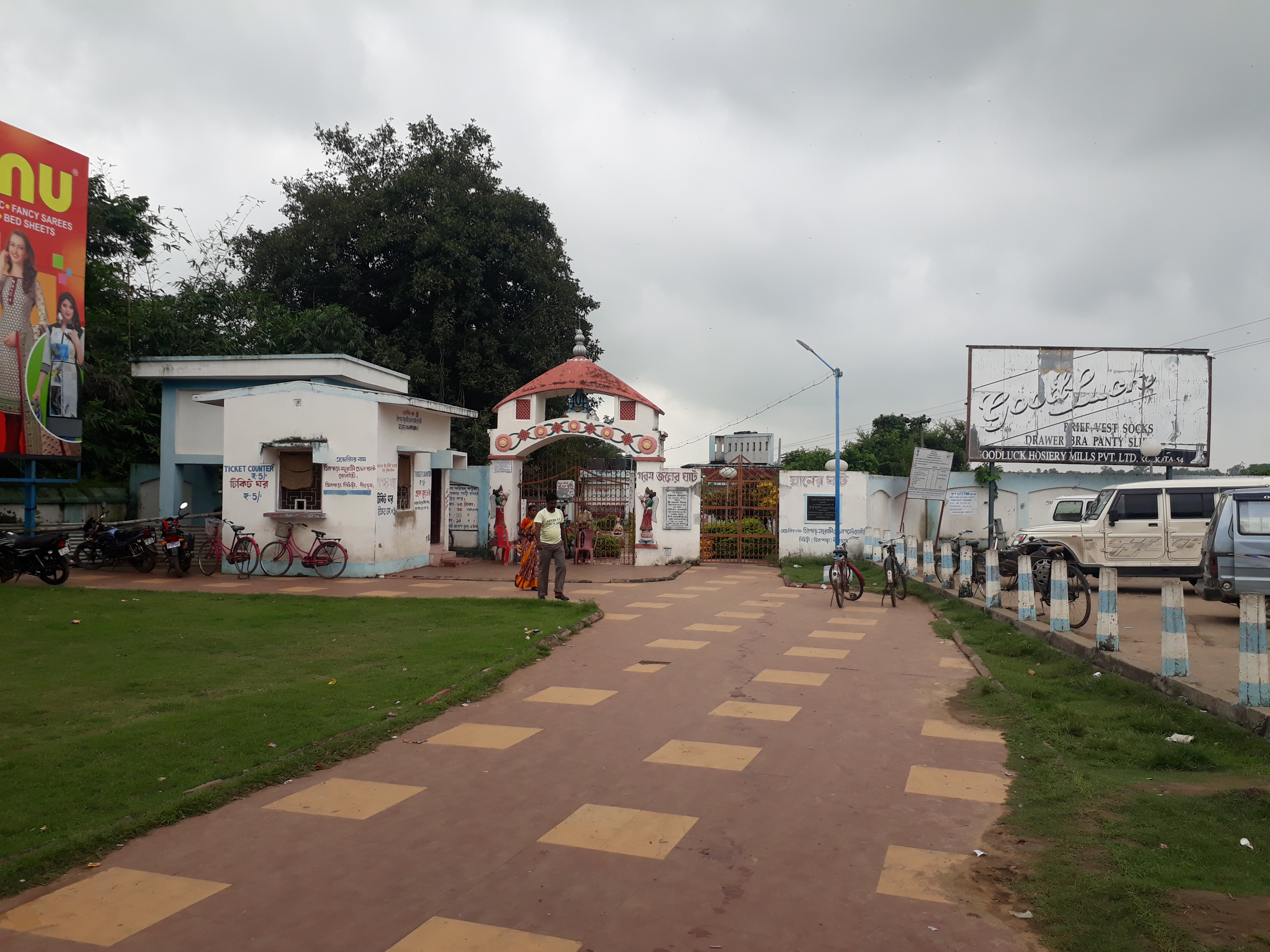
Bakreshwar Hot Spring entrance

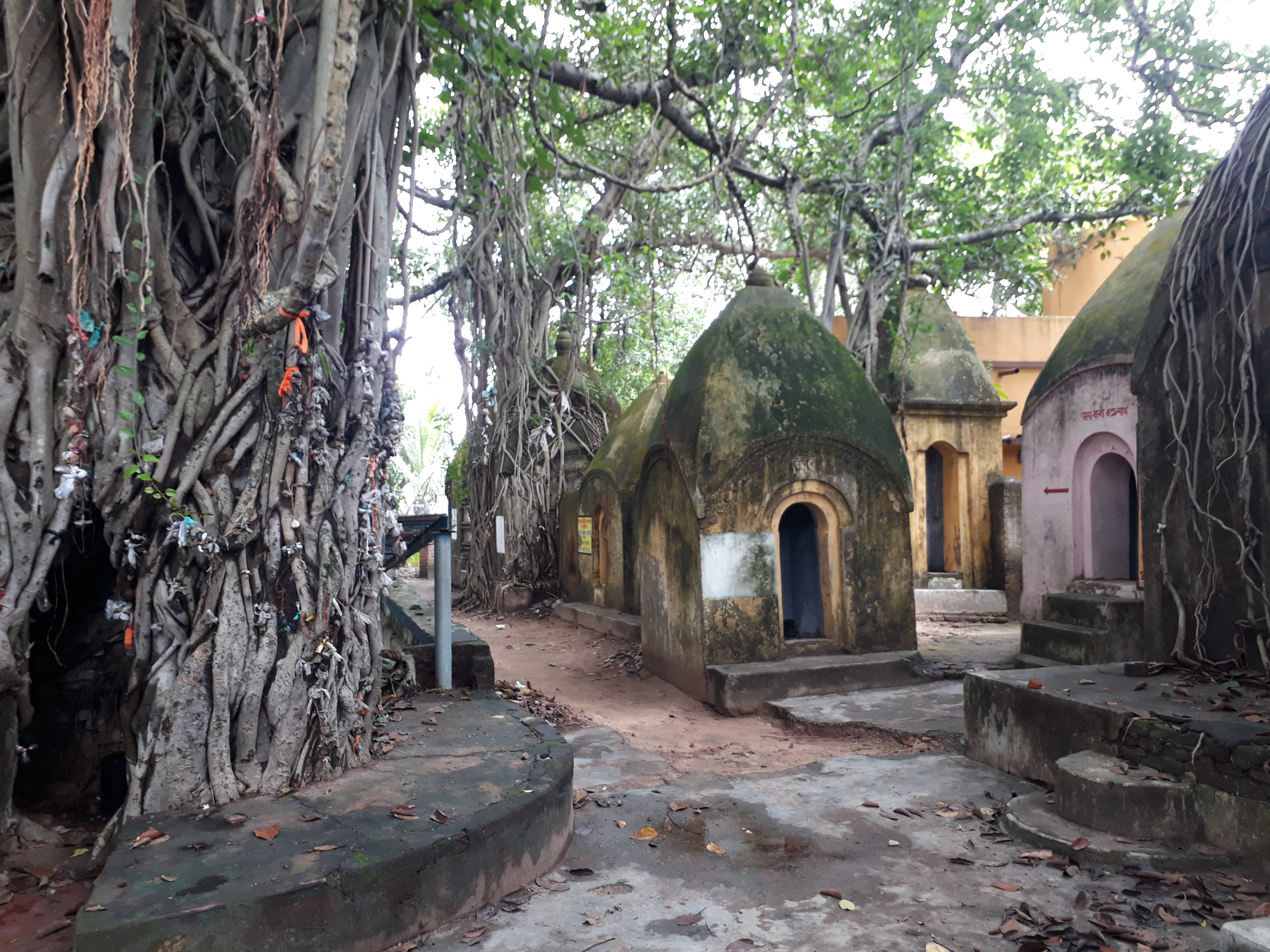
Smaller temples at Bakreshwar

== Economy ==
West Bengal Power Development Corporation Limited (WBPDCL) operates 5 × 210 MW Bakreshwar Thermal Power Station. It is located near Chinpai off Panagarh–Morgram Highway

== Healthcare ==
There is a primary health centre at Bakreshwar with 6 beds.
