= Beharia =

- Village
- Location in West Bengal, India Beharia (India) Beharia (India)
- Coordinates: 23°49′57″N 87°36′33.4″E
- Country: India
- State: West Bengal
- District: Birbhum

Languages
  - Official: Bengali
  - Additional official: English
- Time zone: UTC+5:30 (IST)
- Vehicle registration: WB
- Lok Sabha constituency: Birbhum
- Website: birbhum.nic.in

Beharia is a village in Suri II Block of the Birbhum district in West Bengal. It is administered by Purandarpur gram panchayat. The total area of the village is 221.2 hectares.

== Demographics ==
The Beharia village has a population of 707 of which 360 are males while 347 are females as per Population Census 2011. Male literacy rate of Beharia village is 81.53% and female literacy rate is 65.42% averaging 73.73% literacy rate.

== Education ==
There is a government owned primary school Kalitala Behira Primary School.

== Culture ==
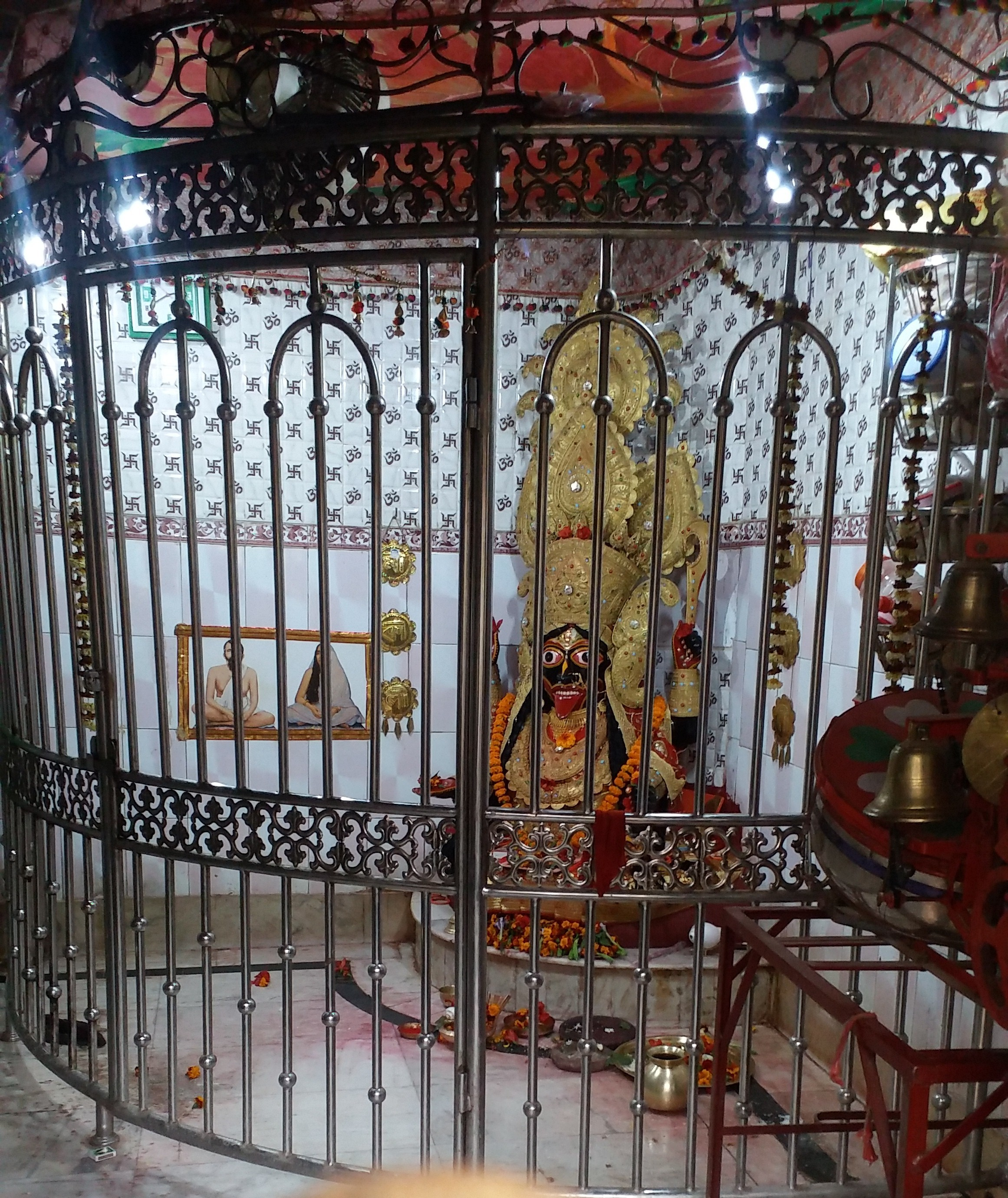
Maa Nimbabasini

There is a temple named Behira Nimbo-basini Kalitala Mondir.
