= Bara Chaturi =

- Village
- Location in West Bengal, India
- Coordinates: 23.964833°N 87.472889°E
- Country: India
- State: West Bengal
- District: Birbhum

Population (2011)
  - Total: 173

Languages
  - Official: Bengali, English
- Time zone: UTC+5:30 (IST)
- PIN: 731103 (Khatanga)
- Telephone/STD code: 03462
- Lok Sabha constituency: Birbhum
- Vidhan Sabha constituency: Suri
- Website: birbhum.nic.in

Bara Chaturi (also written as Barachaturi) is a village in Suri I CD Block in Suri Sadar subdivision of Birbhum district in the Indian state of West Bengal.

== Geography ==
Cities and towns in Suri Sadar subdivision of Birbhum district
M: municipal city/ town, CT: census town, R: rural/ urban centre, B: Barrage.
Owing to space constraints in the small map, the actual locations in a larger map may vary slightly

=== Location ===
The Mayurakshi flows past the village. The office of Khatanga Gram Panchayat is situated in Bara Chaturi.

== Demographics ==
As per the 2011 Census of India, Bara Chaturi had a total population of 173 of which 97 (56%) were males and 76 (44%) were females. Population below 6 years was 10. The total number of literates in Bara Chaturi was 105 (64.42% of the population over 6 years).

== Transport ==
The Suri-Dumka Road passes through Bara Chaturi.

== Healthcare ==
Barachaturi Block Primary Health Centre (PO Khatanga) has 15 beds. In 2012, the average monthly patients attending Bara Chaturi BPHC were 2,323 and average monthly admissions were 24. It handled 90 emergency admissions.
