= Krishna Chandra College =

College in West Bengal

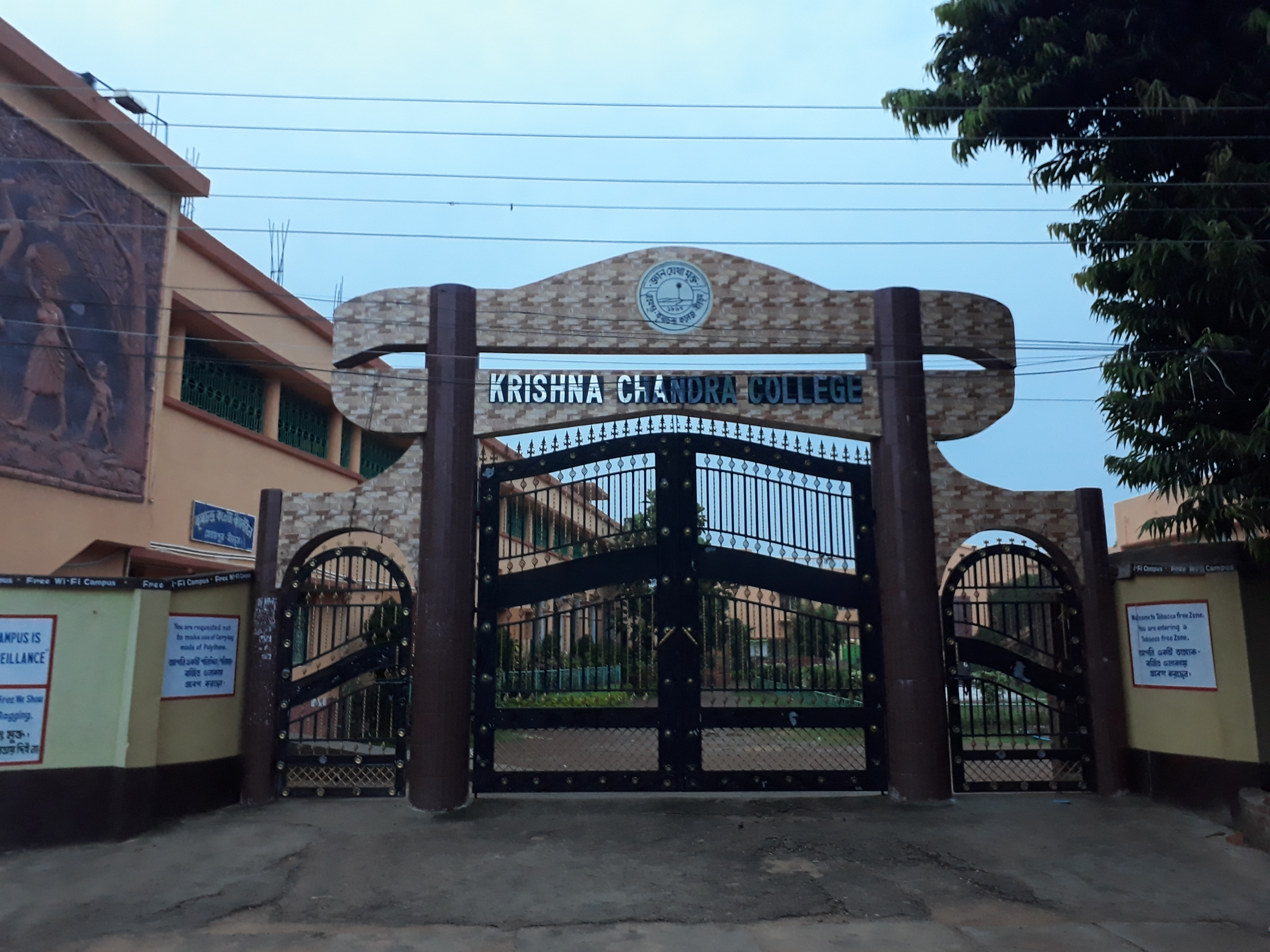
- Krishna Chandra College
- Type: Undergraduate college Public college
- Established: 1897; 129 years ago
- Founders: Maharani Padma Sundari Devi
- Affiliations: University of Burdwan
- President: Ashis Banerjee
- Principal: Goutam Chatterjee
- Location: Hetampur, West Bengal, 731124, India; 23.7778535°N 87.397406°E
- Campus: Urban
- Website: https://kccollege.ac.in/

- Location in West Bengal Krishna Chandra College (India)

Krishna Chandra College, commonly known as Hetampur College, established in 1897, is a government-affiliated college located at Hetampur in the Birbhum district of West Bengal, India. It claims to be the oldest college in the Birbhum district. It is affiliated to the University of Burdwan and teaches science, commerce, and arts.

== History ==
Maharani Padma Sundari Devi, the wife of Maharaja Ramranjan Chakraborty, established this college in 1896 in the name of her father-in-law Raja Krishna Chandra. This college is located in the heart of Hetampur village in the Birbhum district of West Bengal. This college functioned initially as an intermediate college, later in 1956 this college got permission to offer bachelor degree courses. Presently this college offers bachelor's degree courses in different branches of science, arts, and commerce.

== Departments and courses ==
The college offers different undergraduate courses and aims at imparting education to the undergraduates of lower- and middle-class people of Hetampur and its adjoining areas.

=== Science ===
Science faculty consists of the departments of Physics, Chemistry, Mathematics, Botany, Zoology, and Economics.

=== Arts and Commerce ===
Arts and Commerce faculty consists of departments of Bengali, English, Education, Sanskrit, History, Geography, Political Science, Philosophy, and Commerce.

== Accreditation ==
The college is recognized by the University Grants Commission (UGC). This college was accredited by the National Assessment and Accreditation Council (NAAC), and awarded B grade.

== Notable alumni ==
- Mohammad Zakaria, actor

== See also ==
- List of institutions of higher education in West Bengal
- Education in India
- Education in West Bengal
