= Suri I =

- Community development block
- Location in West Bengal
- Coordinates: 23.912833°N 87.493889°E
- Country: India
- State: West Bengal
- District: Birbhum
- Parliamentary constituency: Birbhum
- Assembly constituency: Suri

Area
  - Total: 154.65 km^{2} (59.71 sq mi)

Population (2011)
  - Total: 111,377
  - Density: 720.19/km^{2} (1,865.3/sq mi)
- Time zone: UTC+5.30 (IST)
- Literacy Rate: 72.75 per cent
- Website: http://birbhum.nic.in/

Suri I is a community development block that forms an administrative division in Suri Sadar subdivision of Birbhum district in the Indian state of West Bengal.

== Overview ==
Birbhum district is physiographically a part of the ancient Rarh region. The western portion of the district is basically an extension of the Chota Nagpur Plateau. The area has mostly loose reddish lateritic low fertility soil. In the east, the flood plains of the major rivers, such as the Ajay, Bakreshwar, Mayurakshi and Brahmani, have soft alluvial soil. The forest cover is only 3.5% of the total district. Although coal is found in the district and Bakreshwar Thermal Power Station has a capacity of 2,010 MW, the economic condition of Birbhum is dominated by agriculture. From 1977 onwards majorland reforms took place in West Bengal. Land in excess of land ceiling was acquired and distributed amongst the peasants. In Birbhum district, 19,968 hectares of vested agricultural land has been distributed amongst 161,515 beneficiaries, till 2011. However, more than 38% of the operational land holding is marginal or less than 1 acre. The proportion of agricultural labourers amongst total workers in Birbhum district is 45.9%, the highest amongst all districts of West Bengal. Culturally rich Birbhum, with such traditional landmarks as Jaydev Kenduli and Chandidas Nanoor, is home to Visva-Bharati University at Santiniketan, having close association with two Nobel laureates – Rabindranath Tagore and Amartya Sen.

== Geography ==
Map of Birbhum district showing CD blocks and municipal areas. Click on the map to view larger map.

Karidhya, a constituent panchayat of Suri I block, is located at 23°54′39″N 87°29′38″E.

Suri I CD Block is part of the Suri-Bolpur Plain, one of the four sub-micro physiographic regions of Birbhum district. It covers the interfluves of the Mayurakshi and Ajay rivers, in the south-eastern part of the district. This area exhibits somewhat upland topography sloping from north-west to south-east. Suri I CD Block extends into the adjacent Bakreshwar Uplands.

Tilpara Barrage across the Mayurakshi has a capacity of 9,070,000 cubic metres (7,350 acre⋅ft),

Suri I CD Block is bounded by Mohammad Bazar CD Block on the north, Sainthia and Suri II CD Blocks on the east, Dubrajpur CD Block on the south and Rajnagar CD Block on the west.

Suri I CD Block has an area of 154.65 km^{2}. It has 1 panchayat samity, 7 gram panchayats, 60 gram sansads (village councils), 114 mouzas and 105 inhabited villages, as per District Statistical Handbook Birbhum 2008. Sadaipur police station serves this block. Headquarters of this CD Block is at Karidhya.

Gram panchayats of Suri I block/panchayat samiti are: Alunda, Bhurkuna, Karidhya, Khatanga, Mallikpur, Nagari and Tilpara.

== Demographics ==
=== Population ===
As per the 2011 Census of India, Suri I CD Block had a total population of 111,377, of which 96,141 were rural and 15,236 were urban. There were 56,852 (51%) males and 54,525 (49%) females. Population below 6 years was 13,549. Scheduled Castes numbered 40,025 (35.94%) and Scheduled Tribes numbered 9,837 (8.83%).

As per 2001 census, Suri I block had a total population of 96,485, out of which 49,942 were males and 46,543 were females. Suri I block registered a population growth of 24.61 per cent during the 1991-2001 decade. Decadal growth for Birbhum district was 17.88 per cent. Decadal growth in West Bengal was 17.84 per cent.

Census Towns in Suri I CD Block are (2011 census figures in brackets): Karidhya (10,466) and Kalipur (4,770).

Large village (with 4,000+ population) in Suri I CD Block is (2011 census figure in brackets): Banshjor (4,568).

Other villages in Suri I CD Block include (2011 census figures in brackets): Tilpara (2,928), Bara Alunda (1,101), Chhota Alunda (2,511), Mallickpur (649), Nagari (1,959), Patharchapuri (1,909), Bhurkuna (1,674) and Khatangadihi (895).

=== Literacy ===
As per the 2011 census the total number of literates in Suri I CD Block was 71,173 (72.75% of the population over 6 years) out of which males numbered 39,659 (79.34% of the male population over 6 years) and females numbered 31,514 (65.75% of the female population over 6 years). The gender disparity (the difference between female and male literacy rates) was 13.60%.

See also – List of West Bengal districts ranked by literacy rate

Literacy in CD blocks of
Birbhum district
Rampurhat subdivision
Murarai I – 55.67%
Murarai II – 58.28%
Nalhati I – 69.83%
Nalhati II – 71.68%
Rampurhat I – 73.29%
Rampurhat II – 70.77%
Mayureswar I – 71.52%
Mayureswar II – 70.89%
Suri Sadar subdivision
Mohammad Bazar – 65.18%
Rajnagar – 68.10%
Suri I – 72.75%
Suri II – 72.75%
Sainthia – 72.33%
Dubrajpur – 68.26%
Khoyrasol – 68.75%
Bolpur subdivision
Bolpur Sriniketan – 70.67%
Ilambazar – 74.27%
Labpur – 71.20%
Nanoor – 69.45%
2011 Census: CD Block Wise

Primary Census Abstract Data

=== Language and religion ===
Religion in Suri I CD block (2011)
Hinduism	73.05%
Islam	26.59%
Other or not stated	0.36%

In the 2011 census, Hindus numbered 81,362 and formed 73.05% of the population in Suri I CD Block. Muslims numbered 29,610 and formed 26.59% of the population. Christians numbered 205 and formed 0.18% of the population. Others numbered 200 and formed 0.18% of the population.

The proportion of Hindus in Birbhum district has declined from 72.2% in 1961 to 62.3% in 2011. The proportion of Muslims in Birbhum district has increased from 27.6% to 37.1% during the same period. Christians formed 0.3% in 2011.

Languages in Suri I CD block (2011)
1. Bengali (90.6%)
2. Santali (7.01%)
3. Others (2.38%)

At the time of the 2011 census, 90.61% of the population spoke Bengali and 7.01% Santali as their first language.

== Rural poverty ==
As per the BPL household survey carried out in 2005, the proportion of BPL households in Suri I CD Block was 28.2%, against 42.3% in Birbhum district. In six CD Blocks – Murarai II, Nalhati II, Rampurhat II, Rampurhat I, Suri II and Murarai I – the proportion of BPL families was more than 50%. In three CD Blocks – Rajnagar, Suri I and Labhpur – the proportion of BPL families was less than 30%. The other ten CD Blocks in Birbhum district were placed in between. According to the District Human Development Report, Birbhum, "Although there is no indication that the share of BPL households is more in blocks with higher share of agricultural labourer, there is a clear pattern that the share of BPL households is more in blocks with disadvantaged population in general and Muslim population in particular." (The disadvantaged population includes SCs, STs and Muslims.)

== Economy ==
=== Livelihood ===
Livelihood
in Suri I CD Block
1. Cultivators (11.2%)
2. Agricultural labourers (33.6%)
3. Household industries (4.56%)
4. Other Workers (50.7%)

In Suri I CD Block in 2011, amongst the class of total workers, cultivators numbered 4,848 and formed 11.15%, agricultural labourers numbered 14,614 and formed 33.62%, household industry workers numbered 1,980 and formed 4.56% and other workers numbered 22,022 and formed 50.67%. Total workers numbered 43,464 and formed 39.02% of the total population, and non-workers numbered 67,913 and formed 60.98% of the population.

Note: In the census records a person is considered a cultivator, if the person is engaged in cultivation/ supervision of land owned by self/government/institution. When a person who works on another person's land for wages in cash or kind or share, is regarded as an agricultural labourer. Household industry is defined as an industry conducted by one or more members of the family within the household or village, and one that does not qualify for registration as a factory under the Factories Act. Other workers are persons engaged in some economic activity other than cultivators, agricultural labourers and household workers. It includes factory, mining, plantation, transport and office workers, those engaged in business and commerce, teacher s, entertainment artistes and so on.

=== Infrastructure ===
There are 104 inhabited villages in Suri I CD Block, as per District Census Handbook, Birbhum, 2011. 100% villages have power supply. 93 villages (89.42%) have drinking water supply. 17 villages (16.35%) have post offices. 88 villages (84.62%) have telephones (including landlines, public call offices and mobile phones). 36 villages (34.62%) have a pucca (paved) approach road and 44 villages (42.31%) have transport communication (includes bus service, rail facility and navigable waterways). 19 villages (18.27%) have agricultural credit societies and 8 villages (7.69%) have banks.

=== Agriculture ===
Following land reforms land ownership pattern has undergone transformation. In 2004-05 (the agricultural labourer data is for 2001), persons engaged in agriculture in Suri I CD Block could be classified as follows: bargadars 4,572 (14.37%), patta (document) holders 6,271 (19.71%), small farmers (possessing land between 1 and 2 hectares) 2,480 (7.79%), marginal farmers (possessing land up to 1 hectare) 6,950 (21.84%) and agricultural labourers 11,551 (36.30%).

Birbhum is a predominantly paddy cultivation-based agricultural district. The area under paddy cultivation in 2010-11 was 249,000 hectares of land. Paddy is grown in do, suna and sali classes of land. There is double to triple cropping system for paddy cultivation. Other crops grown in Birbhum are gram, masuri, peas, wheat, linseed, khesari, til, sugarcane and occasionally cotton. 192,470 hectares of cultivable land is under irrigation by different sources, such as canals, tanks, river lift irrigation and different types of tubewells. In 2009–10, 158,380 hectares were irrigated by canal water. There are such major irrigation projects as Mayurakshi and Hijli. Other rivers such as Ajoy, Brahmani, Kuskurni, Dwaraka, Hingla and Kopai are also helpful for irrigation in the district.

In 2013–14, there were 23 fertiliser depots, 10 seed stores and 46 fair price shops in Suri I CD block.

In 2013–14, Suri I CD block produced 120,944 tonnes of Aman paddy, the main winter crop, from 34,013 hectares, 2,604 tonnes of Boro paddy (spring crop) from 803 hectares, 1,265 tonnes of wheat from 477 hectares, 6,528 tonnes of potatoes from 370 hectares and 1,089 tonnes of sugar cane from 14 hectares. It also produced pulses and oilseeds.

In 2013–14, the total area irrigated in Suri I CD block was 4,483 hectares, out of which 2,060 hectares were irrigated by canal water, 1,129 hectares by tank water, 523 hectares by river lift irrigation, 340 hectares by deep tube wells, 131 hectares by shallow tube wells and 300 hectares by other means.

=== Banking ===
In 2013–14, Suri I CD block had offices of 26 commercial banks and 3 gramin banks.

=== Power ===
The 1,005 MW Bakreshwar Thermal Power Station, West Bengal Power Development Corporation Limited, was commissioned between 1999 and 2009. The industrial township, Bakreswar Thermal Power Plant Township is situated in this block.

=== Other sectors ===
According to the District Human Development Report, 2009, Birbhum is one of the most backward districts of West Bengal in terms of industrial development. Of the new industrial projects set-up in West Bengal between 1991 and 2005, only 1.23% came to Birbhum. Bakreshwar Thermal Power Station is the only large-scale industry in the district and employs about 5,000 people. There are 4 medium-scale industries and 4,748 registered small-scale industries.

The proportion of workers engaged in agriculture in Birbhum has been decreasing. According to the District Human Development Report, "more people are now engaged in non-agricultural activities, such as fishing, retail sales, vegetable vending, selling milk, and so on. As all these activities are at the lower end of the spectrum of marketable skills, it remains doubtful if these activities generate enough return for their family’s sustenance."

=== Backward Regions Grant Fund ===
Birbhum district is listed as a backward region and receives financial support from the Backward Regions Grant Fund. The fund, created by the Government of India, is designed to redress regional imbalances in development. As of 2012, 272 districts across the country were listed under this scheme. The list includes 11 districts of West Bengal.

== Transport ==
Suri I CD block has 36 originating/ terminating bus routes.

The Andal-Sainthia branch line passes through this block. There is a station at Suri.

NH 14 and SH 6 cross at Suri.

== Culture ==
Data Saheber Mela at Patharchapuri, held in the month of Chaitra (March–April), commemorating the death of a Muslim saint popular as Data Saheb, attracts lakhs of pilgrims. It is perhaps the largest fair in the region.

== Education ==
In 2013–14, Suri I CD block had 88 primary schools with 6,269 students, 4 middle schools with 146 students, 9 high schools with 6,070 students and 4 higher secondary schools with 5,422 students. Suri I CD Block had 7 technical/ professional institutions with 1,188 students and 226 institutions for special and non-formal education with 6,554 students. Suri municipal area has 2 general degree colleges (outside the CD block).

As per the 2011 census, in Suri I CD Block, amongst the 104 inhabited villages, 13 villages did not have a school, 21 villages had more than 1 primary school, 19 villages had at least 1 primary and 1 middle school and 13 villages had at least 1 middle and 1 secondary school. 6 villages had senior secondary schools. There were 2 engineering degree colleges and 1 medical college in Suri I CD Block.

== Healthcare ==
In 2014, Suri I CD block had 1 block primary health centre, 2 primary health centres and 1 private nursing home with total 80 beds and 3 doctors (excluding private bodies). It had 16 family welfare subcentres. 1,192 patients were treated indoor and 44,476 patients were treated outdoor in the hospitals, health centres and subcentres of the CD block.

As per 2011 census, in Suri I CD Block, 2 villages had primary health centres, 13 villages had primary health subcentres, 3 villages had maternity and child welfare centres, 2 villages had veterinary hospitals, 3 villages had medicine shops and out of the 104 inhabited villages 75 villages had no medical facilities.

Barachaturi Block Primary Health Centre at PO Khatanga has 15 beds. There are primary health centres at Kachujore (PO Mhubuna) (10 beds) and Chakdaha (6 beds).
