= Purandarpur =

- Village
- Location in West Bengal, India
- Coordinates: 23.865278°N 87.578578°E
- Country: India
- State: West Bengal
- District: Birbhum

Population (2011)
  - Total: 4,566

Languages
  - Official: Bengali, English
- Time zone: UTC+5:30 (IST)
- PIN: 731129 (Purandarpur)
- Telephone/STD code: 03462
- Lok Sabha constituency: Birbhum
- Vidhan Sabha constituency: Sainthia
- Website: birbhum.nic.in

Purandarpur is a village in Suri II CD block in Suri Sadar subdivision of Birbhum district in the state of West Bengal, India.

== Geography ==
Cities and towns in Suri Sadar subdivision of Birbhum district
M: municipal city/ town, CT: census town, R: rural/ urban centre, B: Barrage.
Owing to space constraints in the small map, the actual locations in a larger map may vary slightly

=== Location ===
It is situated in between Suri and Bolpur and approximately 8 km from Suri, 11 km from Ahmadpur, 13 km from Sainthia and 28 km from Bolpur Shantiniketan.

=== CD block HQ ===
The headquarters of Suri II CD block are located at Purandarpur.

=== Places of interest ===
Behira, a tourist destination, is situated 2 km on the way to Bolpur. An old Kali Mandir (Kali temple), on the bank of Bakreshwar River in a deep forest is the main attraction. There is a Dharmaraj temple in the village, where an annual festival is held regarding the Dharmaraj myths. A Mahaprabhu temple is also there in the village.

== Demographics ==
As per the 2011 Census of India, Purandarpur had a total population of 4,566 of which 2,326 (51%) were males and 2,240 (49%) were females. Population below 6 years was 499. The total number of literates in Purandarpur was 3,204 (78.78% of the population over 6 years).

== Transport ==
The village is located at the connecting point of the roads from Bolpur to Suri and Ahmadpur to Suri. The nearest railway station is at Suri, which is the District headquarters of Birbhum district.

== Post Office ==
Purandarpur has a delivery sub post office, with PIN 731129, under Suri head office. Branch offices having the same PIN are Damdama, Dholitkuri, Gadadharpur, Ikra and Majhigram.

== Education ==
Purandarpur High School, a Bengali-medium co-educational school, was established in 1957. It has facilities for teaching from class VI to class 12. The school has 12 computers and a library of 1,500 books. It is housed in a government building and has a play ground.

== Culture ==
Purandarpur Rural Library, a government-sponsored library, was established in 1940. It has its own pucca building.

== Healthcare ==
There is a primary health centre at Purandarpur with 10 beds.

== Gallery ==
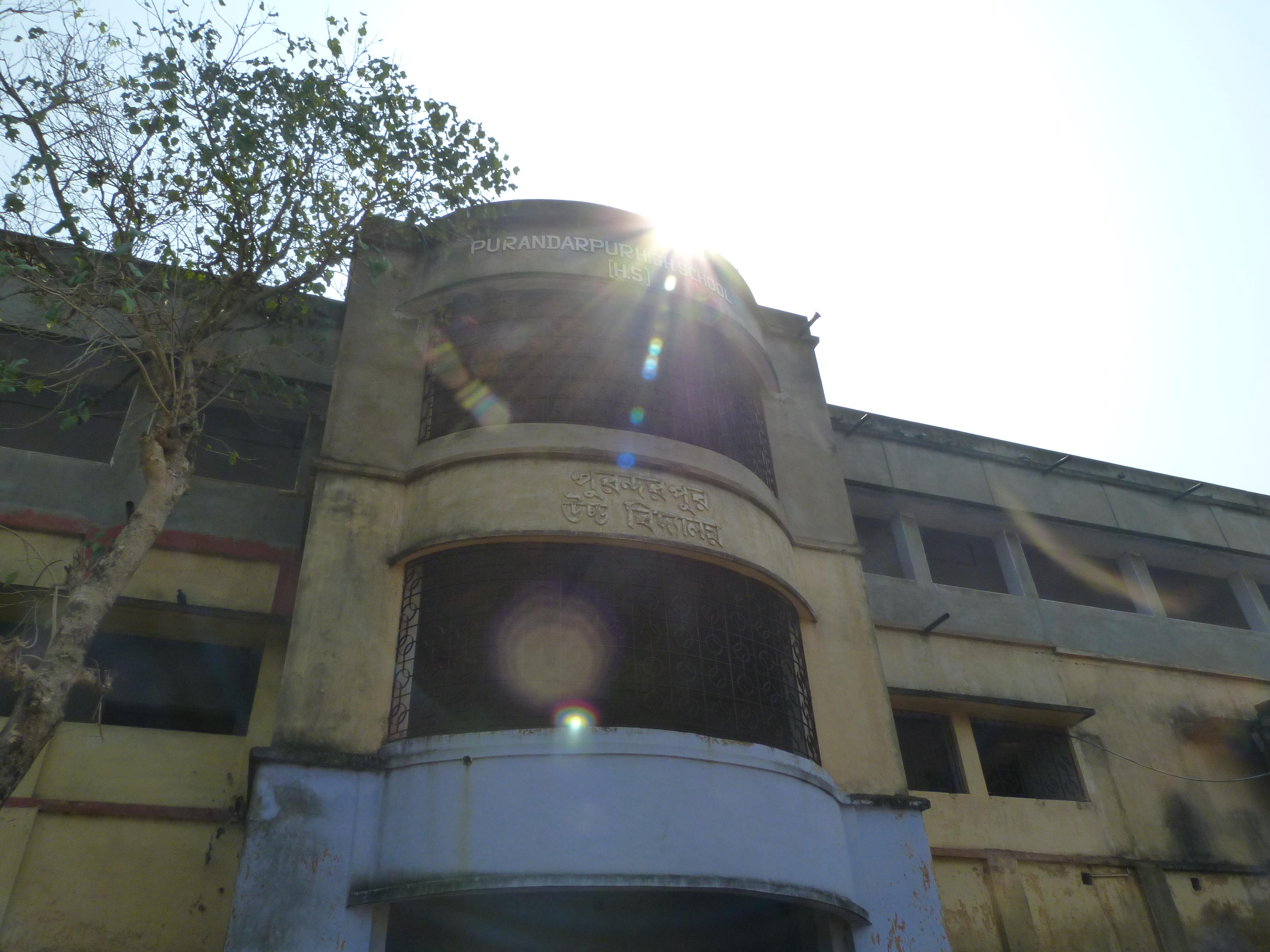
Purandarpur High School, Birbhum

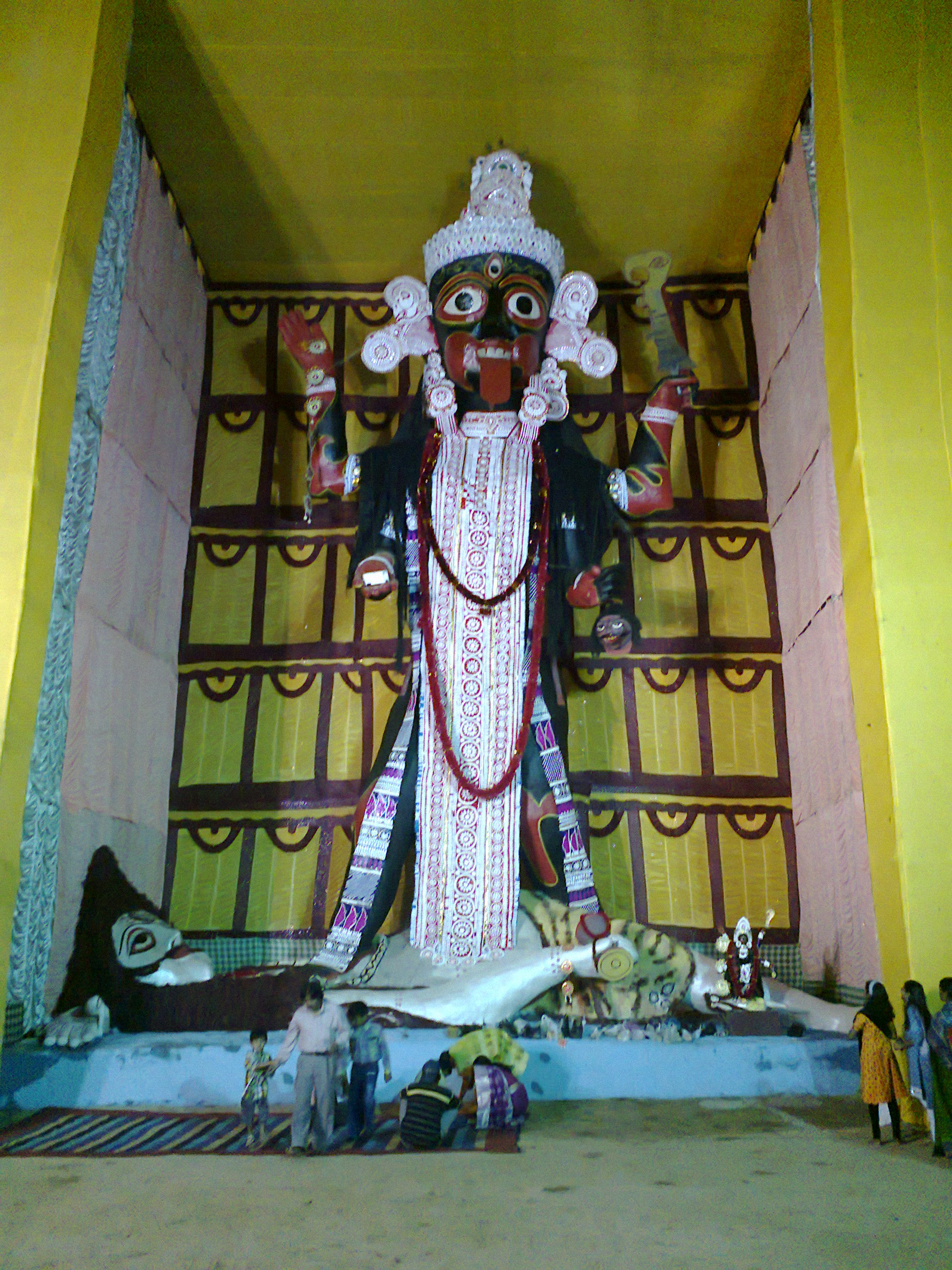
Kali Ma Bandhab Samiti

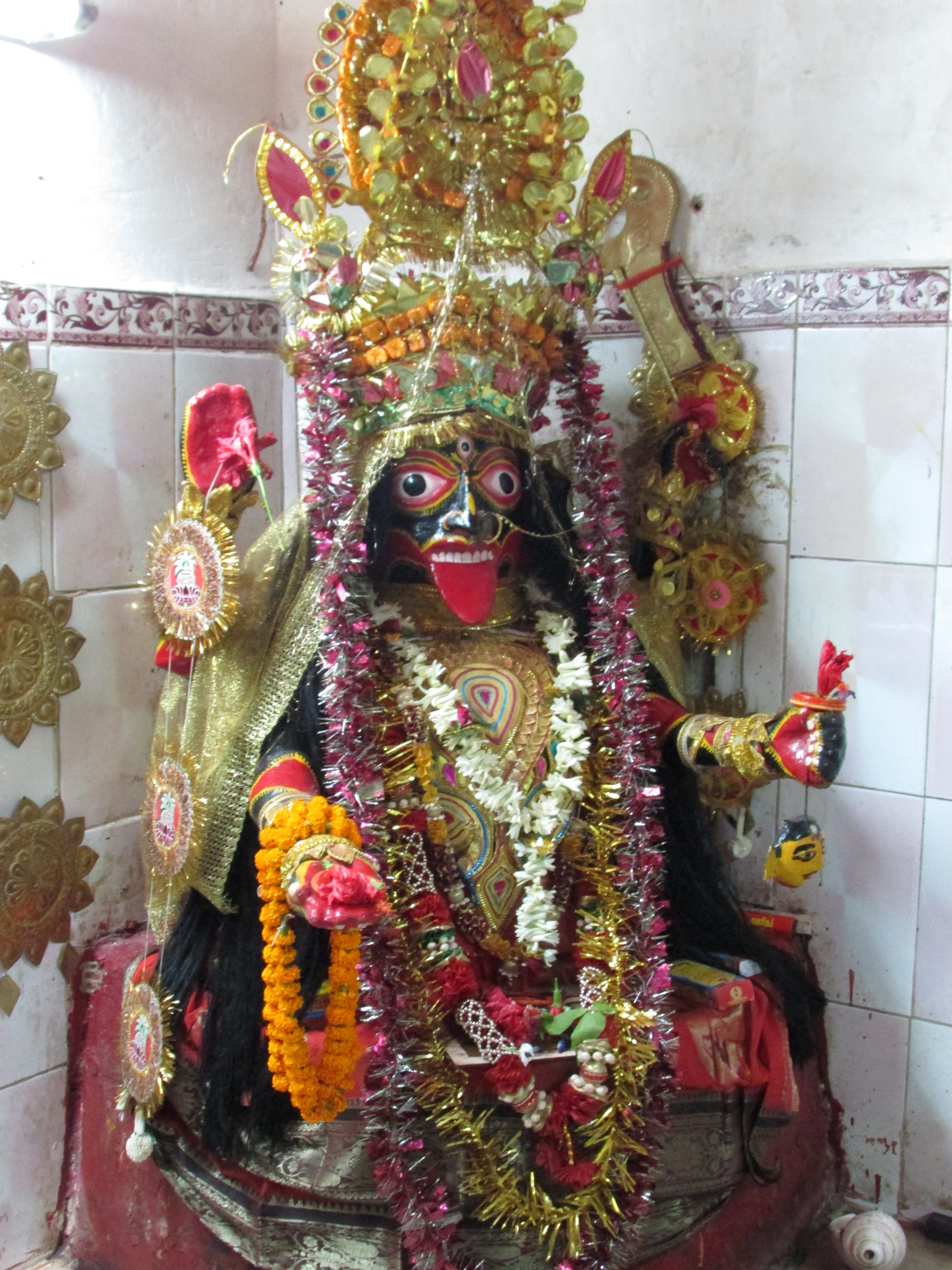
Behira Maa Kali

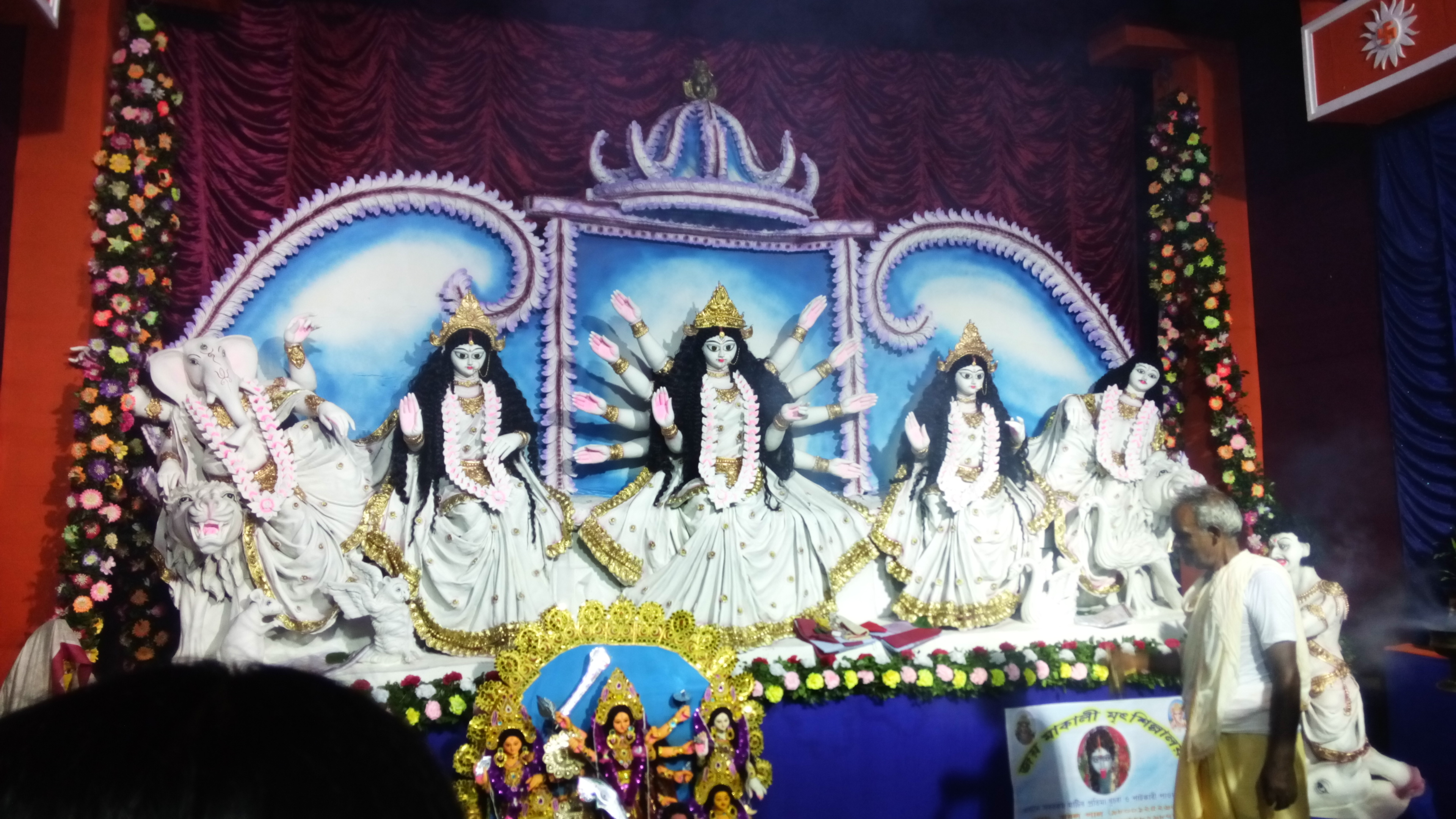
Durga Maa
