= Mohammad Zakaria =

- Born: 1923; Sekeddaha, Birbhum District, Bengal Presidency
- Died: 1993 (aged 69–70)

Mohammad Zakaria was a Bangladeshi actor and producer. In 1970–90 he had a strong presence in Television, Radio and Theatre. His astonishing story telling voice could grab the attention of the listener so easily.

== Early life ==
Zakaria was born on 22 February 1932 to a Bengali Muslim family in the village of Sekeddaha in Birbhum district, Bengal Presidency. He was the son of Mohammad Ali Birbhumi. At a young age, he learnt the tilawa of the Qur'an. He studied at a madrasa in Birbhum until sixth class. His father wished for him to become a hafiz i.e. memorize the entire Qur'an off by heart. However, his mother desired for him to enrol at the Mallarpur English School which he eventually joined. From there, he studied at the Suri Senior Benimadhab Institution where he passed his matriculation. He completed his Intermediate of Arts from the Krishna Chandra College.

== Works ==
- Ulukhagda (1950)
- Chhenda Tar (1952)
- Dashchakra (1952)
- Dharmaghat (1953)
- Raktakarabi (1954)
- Dakghar (1957)
- Aghatan Ajo Ghate (1961)
- Ek Peyala Coffee (1962)
- Psychotherapy
- Bahana (1965)
- Behula (1966)
- Begana (1966)
- Subachan Nirbasane (1974)
- Chardike Yuddha (1976)
- Payer Aoyaj Paoya Yay (1976)
- Dui Bon (1978)
- Othello (1981)
- Macbeth (1983)
- Akhano Krtadas (1983)
- Pratibeshi
- Idiot

== Awards ==
- National Drama Festival Award (New Delhi, 1954)
- Ekushey Padak (1981)
- Kazi Mahbubullah Zebunnesa Trust Medal (1983)
- Bangladesh Shilpakala Academy Prize (1978)
- Bangladesh Film Journalist Association Prize (1985)
- Sequence Award of Merit (1980)
- Sammilita Sanskritik Jot Padak (1992)
