= Panagarh–Morgram Highway =

Road in West Bengal, India

Route information
- Length: 171 km (106 mi)

Major junctions
- From: Panagarh on NH 19
- To: Morgram on NH 12

Location
- Country: India
- States: West Bengal
- Primary destinations: Ilambazar–Dubrajpur–Suri–Rampurhat

Highway system
- Roads in India; Expressways; National; State; Asian

Panagarh–Morgram Highway runs from the junction with NH 19 at Panagarh Darjeeling Mor to NH 12 at Morgram. It passes through Kanksa, Ilambazar, Hetampur, Dubrajpur, Suri, Rampurhat, Nalhati and Lohapur. It is mostly a two lane (30 feet wide) highway with a total length of 171 kilometres (106 mi). Panagarh to Suri is 71 kilometres (44 mi) and Suri to Morgram is 100 kilometres (62 mi).Panagarh to Rampurhat distance is 120Km and Morgram to Rampurhat is 35 Km The Dubrajpur-Morgram sector is part of NH 14 and the Dubrajpur-Panagarh sector is part of SH 14.

== Junctions ==
At Ilambazar, it meets the Bolpur-Santiniketan Road. A little after Ilambazar it meets the road from Jaydev Kenduli, 7 kilometres (4.3 mi) off the highway. At Dubrajpur it meets two roads – one coming from Raniganj Punjabi Mor and an alternative road coming from Suri via Bakreshwar. At Suri, the headquarters of Birbhum district, several roads converge – one from Bolpur-Santiniketan (State Highway 6), one from Sainthia, and an alternative road from Dubrajpur via Bakreshwar, which also branches off to Rajnagar(State Highway 6). The road to Dumka via Massanjore Dam meets it at Saharakuri. Tarapith is 12 kilometres (7.5 mi) off the highway and the Tarapith Road meets it just before Rampurhat.

== Rivers ==
The highway crosses Ajay River just before entering Ilambazar, Bakreshwar River after Dubrajpur, goes over the Tilpara Barrage across the Mayurakshi River, Dwarka River before Rampurhat and the Brahmani river before Nalhati.

== Cost ==
The highway from Ilambazar to Moragram was constructed by AFCONS at a cost of $150-million funded by Asian Development Bank.

== See also ==
- List of national highways in India
- National Highways Development Project
