= Karidhya =

- Census Town
- Location in West Bengal, India Karidhya (India)
- Coordinates: 23.912833°N 87.493889°E
- Country: India
- State: West Bengal
- District: Birbhum

Area
  - Total: 2.4489 km^{2} (0.9455 sq mi)

Population (2011)
  - Total: 10,466
  - Density: 4,273.8/km^{2} (11,069/sq mi)

Languages
  - Official: Bengali, English
- Time zone: UTC+5:30 (IST)
- PIN: 731126
- Telephone code: 03462
- Vehicle registration: WB
- Lok Sabha constituency: Birbhum
- Vidhan Sabha constituency: Suri
- Website: birbhum.nic.in

Karidhya is a census town in Suri I CD block in Suri Sadar subdivision of Birbhum district in the Indian state of West Bengal.

== Geography ==
Cities and towns in Suri Sadar subdivision of Birbhum district
M: municipal city/ town, CT: census town, R: rural/ urban centre, B: Barrage.
Owing to space constraints in the small map, the actual locations in a larger map may vary slightly

=== CD block HQ ===
The headquarters of Suri I CD block are located at Karidhya.

== Demographics ==
As per the 2011 Census of India, Karidhya had a total population of 10,466 of which 5,325 (51%) were males and 5,141 (49%) were females. Population below 6 years was 1,038. The total number of literates in Karidhya was 8,005 (84.91% of the population over 6 years).

== Infrastructure ==
As per the District Census Handbook 2011, Karidhya covered an area of 2.4489 km^{2}. The nearest railway station is at Suri 4 km away. Buses are available in the town. It has 9 km roads and open drains. The major source of protected water supply is from bore well pumping and over head tank. There are 872 domestic electric connections. Amongst the medical facilities it has are 1 medicine shop. Amongst the educational facilities it has are 6 primary schools, 1 middle school, 1 secondary school and 1 senior secondary school. The nearest general degree college is at Suri. Amongst the recreational and cultural facilities it has 1 working women’s hostel, 1 public library and 1 reading room. It has the branch of 1 non-agricultural credit society. Amongst the commodities it produces are handloom goods, conch shell products and sal leaf plates.

== Transport ==
State Highway 6 (locally popular as Saptagram, Tribeni, Kalna, Katwa Road or STKK), running from Rajnagar (in Birbhum district) to Alampur (in Howrah district), passes through Karidhya.

== Post office ==
Karidhya has a delivery sub post office, with PIN 731126, under Suri head office. Branch offices having the same PIN are Bhabanipur, Ganeshpur, Ghatdurlavpur, Gohaliara, Madhaipur, Nagari, Paruliahazrapur, Patadanga, Patharchapuri, Rajganj, Rautara, Sajina, Tabadurga and Tantipara.

== Culture ==
Karidhya Town Library, a government-sponsored library, was established in 1953. It has its own pucca building.Some of the famous festivals here are Rath Yatra, Durga Puja,Gosta Ashtami,Gajan Utsab, some famous fairs are Bhuiportola Mela, Gostar Mela etc.
