= Hetampur =

- Town
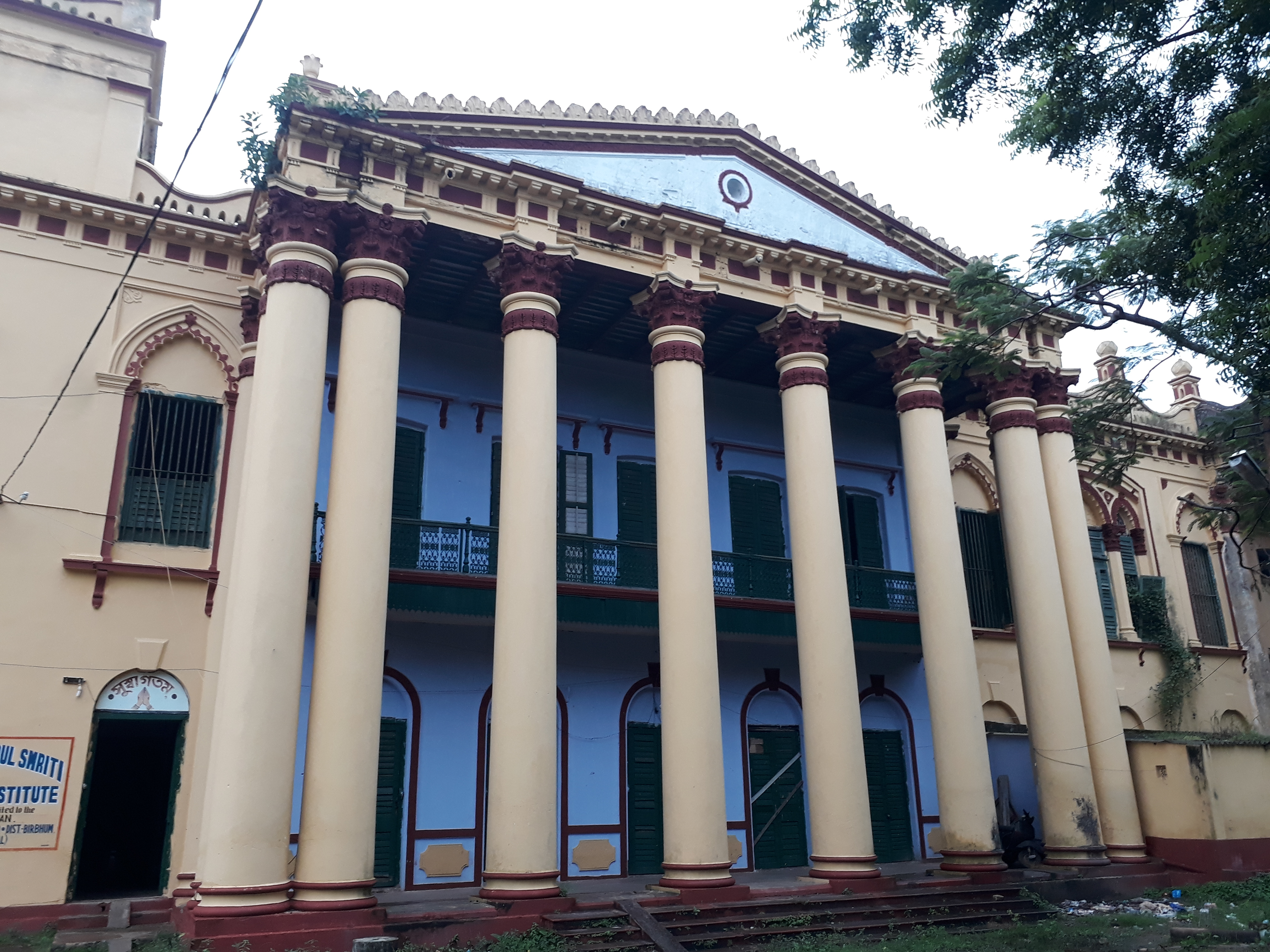
- Hetampur Royal palace

- Location in West Bengal, India
- Coordinates: 23.781936°N 87.403346°E
- Country: India
- State: West Bengal
- District: Birbhum

Population (2011)
  - Total: 2,388

Languages
  - Official: Bengali, English
- Time zone: UTC+5:30 (IST)
- PIN: 731124
- Telephone/STD code: 91 3462
- ISO 3166 code: IN-BR
- Lok Sabha constituency: Birbhum
- Vidhan Sabha constituency: Dubrajpur
- Website: birbhum.nic.in

Hetampur is a large village in Suri Sadar subdivision of Birbhum District in the Indian state of West Bengal. It is situated near Dubrajpur. The village is famous for the Royal and historical palace.

== Geography ==
Cities and towns in Suri Sadar subdivision of Birbhum district
M: municipal city/ town, CT: census town, R: rural/ urban centre, B: Barrage.
Owing to space constraints in the small map, the actual locations in a larger map may vary slightly

=== Location ===
Hetampur is located at 23°46′55″N 87°24′12″E.

== Demographics ==
As of the 2011 Census, Hetampur had a population of 2,388; 1,188 males and 1,200 females, giving a ratio of 1010 compared to the West Bengal state average of 950. There were 282 children aged 0–6 and a child sex ratio of 1104, compared to the West Bengal state average of 956.

Hetampur village had a literacy rate of 76.21%, compared to 76.26% of West Bengal- male literacy was 84.82% and female was 67.59%

== Education ==
At Hetampur Krishna Chandra College, popularly known as Hetampur Mahavidyalaya is one of the reputed and oldest college of the West Bengal. There are also few schools and training institutes such as Hetampur Raj High School, Hetampur Girls’ High School, St. Andrus, Hetampur Model School, DAV Public School, Rabindra Najrul Smrit B. Ed College, Hetampur Rajbati Primary Teachers Training Institute etc.

== Culture ==
=== Rajbari ===
The Rajbari was built in the shape of a castle with 999 doors which has given it the name Hetampur HajarDuari. (hajar is one thousand in Bengali, duari means doored). Hetampur Rajbari has been used by film directors such as Satyajit Ray, Mrinal Sen, Tarun Majumdar, Raja Sen, Dilip Roy, Sandip Ray and others in many Bengali films – Goopy Gyne Bagha Byne, Abhijan, Mrigaya, and Ganadebata.

=== Temples ===
Hetampur has many interesting terracotta temples in various styles of architecture. During the late 1940s till about 1952 Indian artist Mukul Dey conducted detailed photographic survey of Birbhum-Barddhaman group of terracotta temples. He visited Hetampur and photo recorded the Gol-Mandir, the Chandranath Shiva temple and the Dewanji temples here. Chandranatha Siva Mandir in Hetampur of Dubrajpur, Birbhum built in 1847 is Octagonal pinnacled - Naba Ratna type with terracotta on three sides. Dewanji Mandir nearby is tightly ridged Rekha type with small terracotta facade of 19th century Birbhum-Barddhaman style having rich terracotta on two sides. Out of these three temples, the Gol-Mandir temple is no longer in existence at Hetampur. Its memory survives only in the photographs by Mukul Dey. A portrait of Queen Victoria, European nuns and priests form the theme of decoration on a 19th-century temple in Hetampur.

=== Temple picture gallery ===
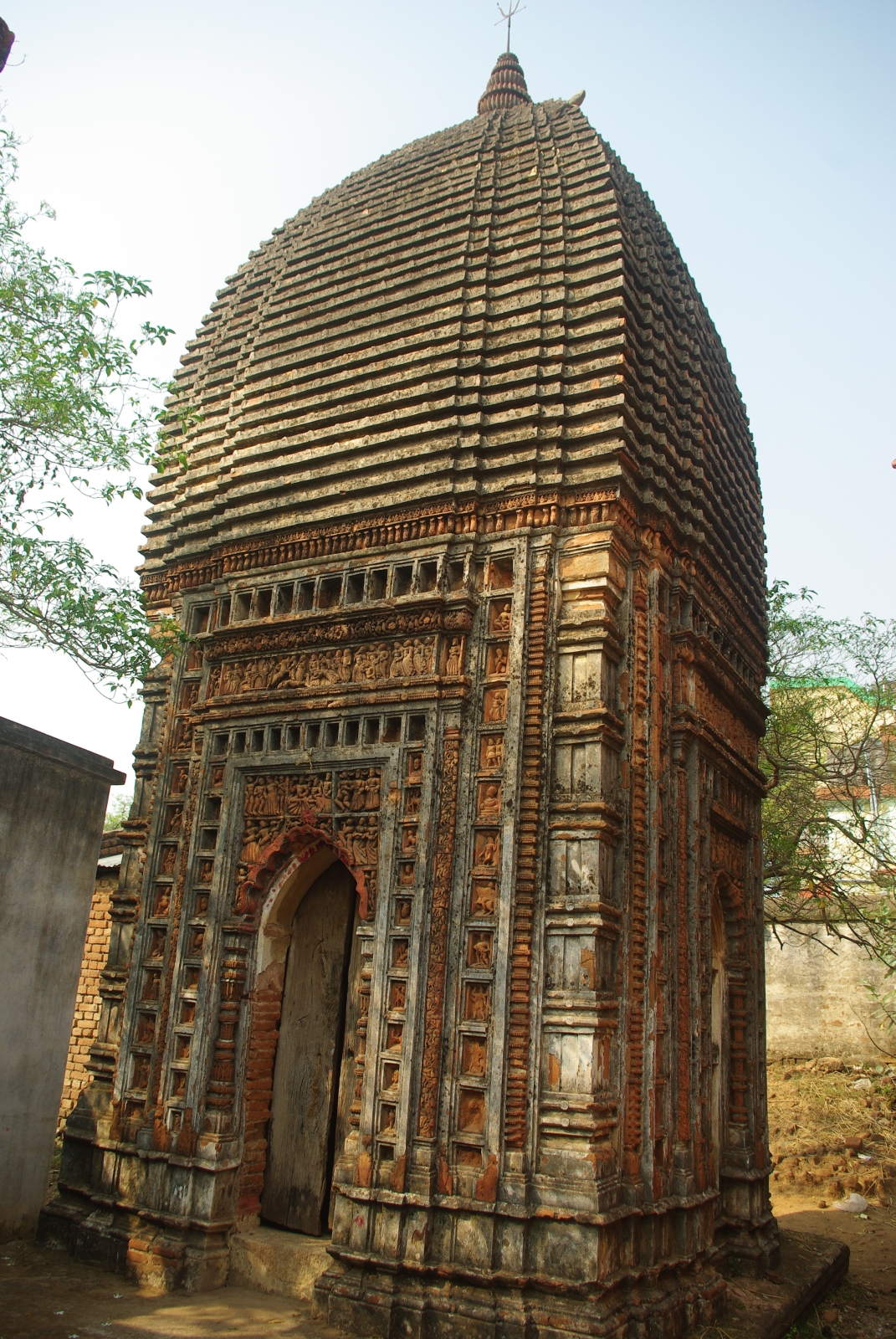
Dewanji temple

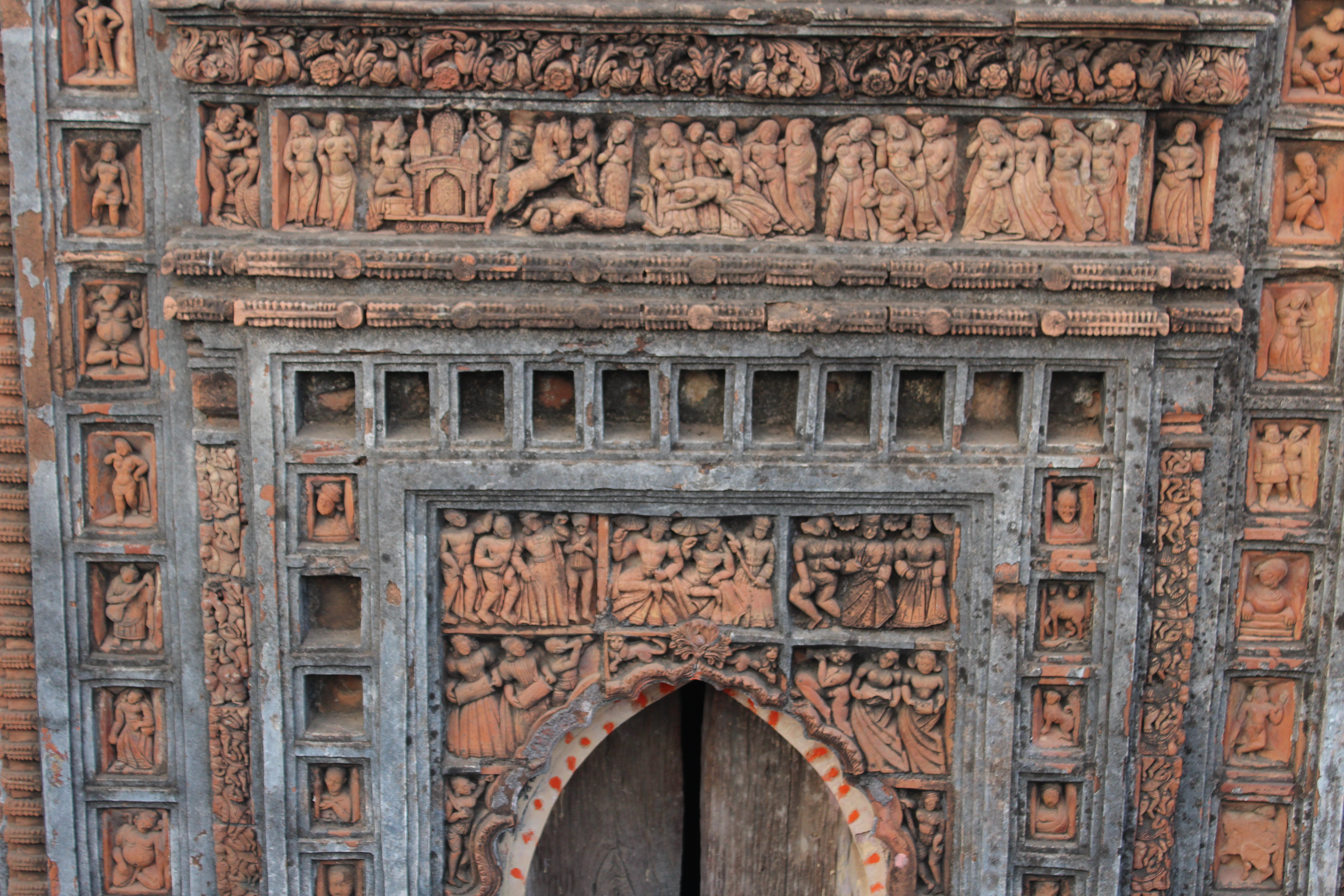
Terracotta carvings in Dewanji temple

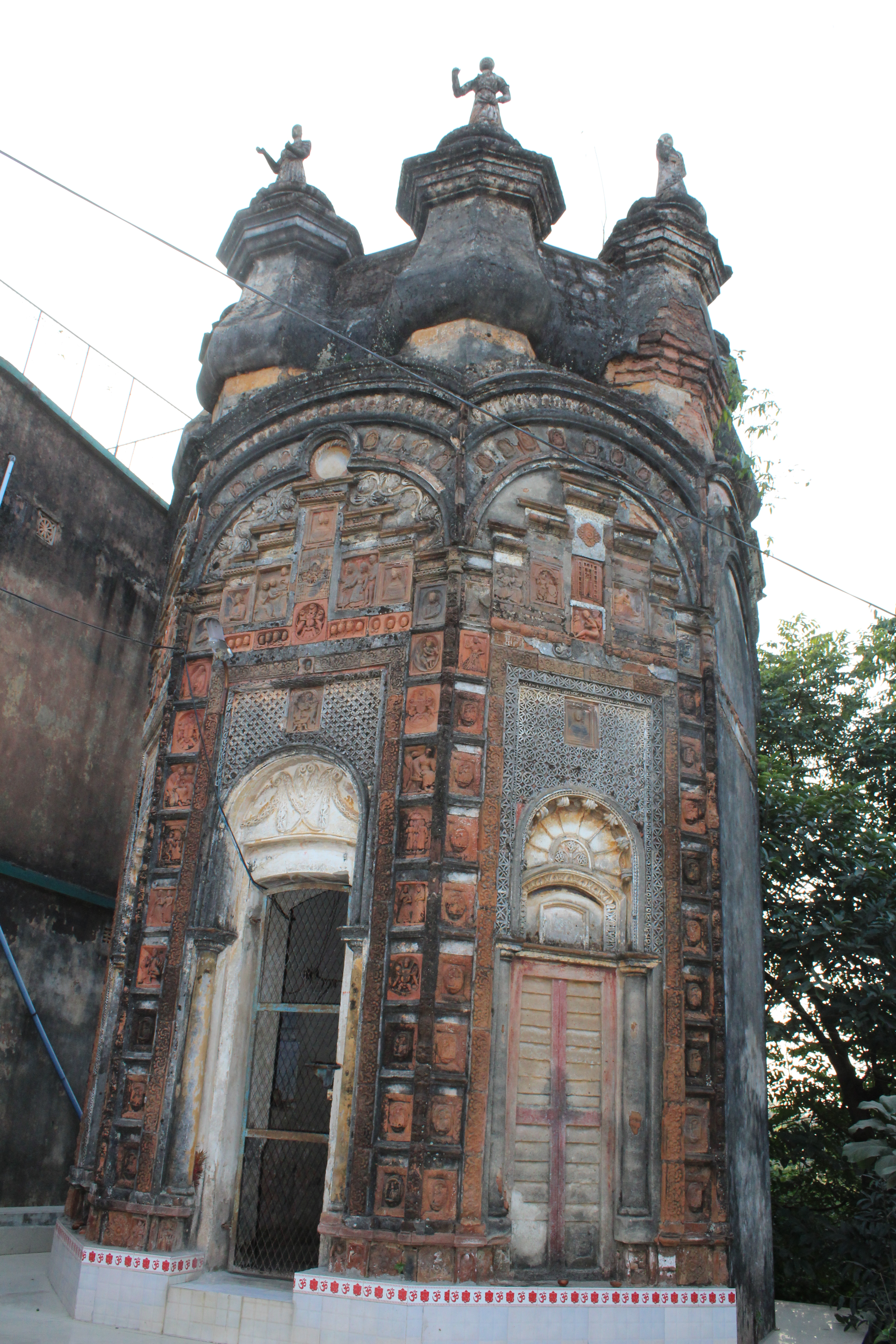
Chandranath Shiva temple

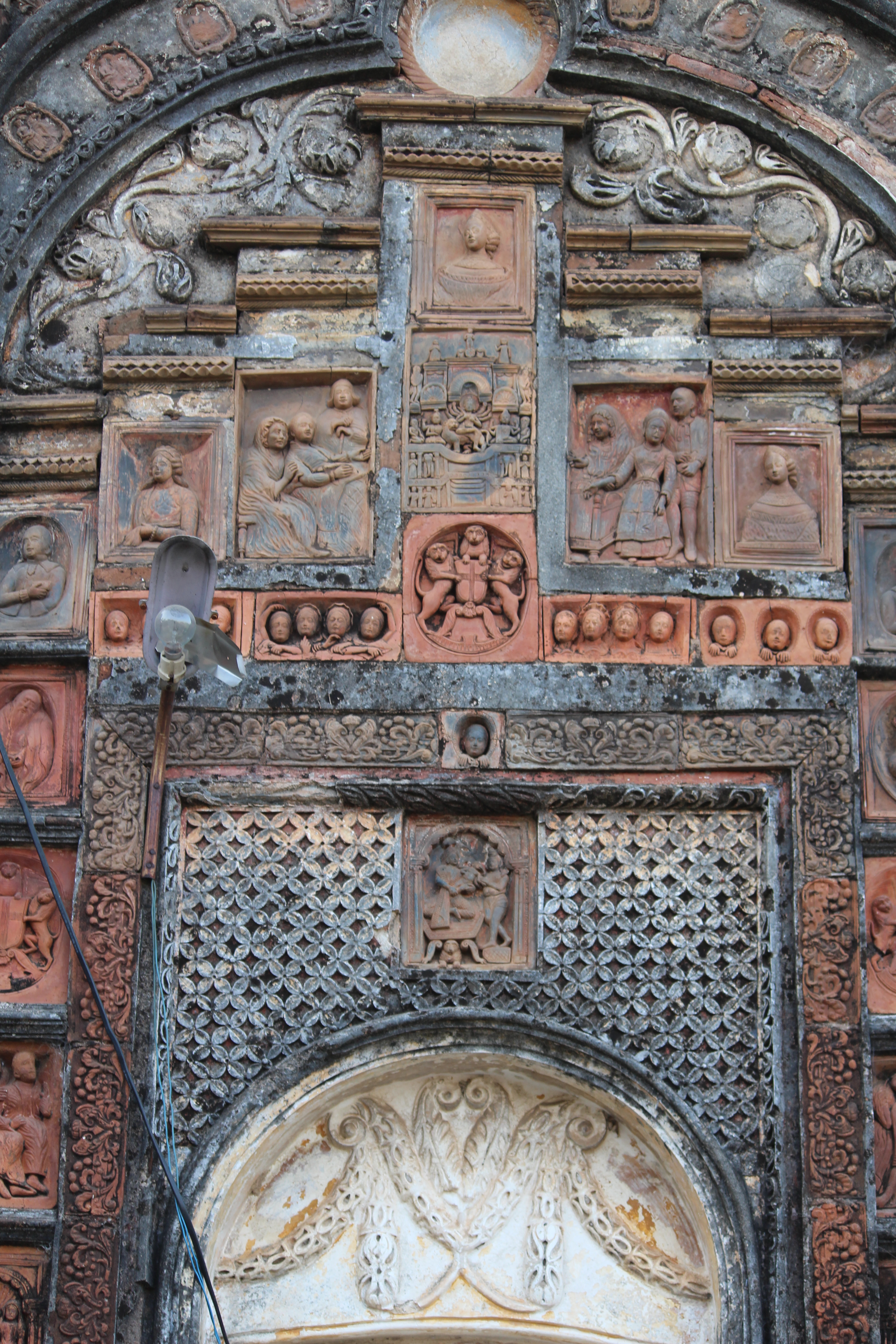
Terracotta carvings at Chandranath Shiva temple

=== Fair ===
Bipracharan Chakravarty of the Hetampur Raj family started a Saraswati Puja at Hetampur. His grandson, Ramranjan, started a 3-days fair on the occasion. The fair continues on the grounds of the Hetampur Rajbari. Gurusaday Dutt had once presented raibeshe bratachari during the fair. Many renowned personalities were invited to attend the fair and some of them came. Hetampur Royal Theatre and Ranjan Opera had their inaugural shows at the fair.
