= Ilambazar =

- Census Town
- Location in West Bengal, India
- Coordinates: 23.63°N 87.53°E
- Country: India
- State: West Bengal
- District: Birbhum

Area
  - Total: 1.8648 km^{2} (0.7200 sq mi)
- Elevation: 54 m (177 ft)

Population (2011)
  - Total: 7,125
  - Density: 3,821/km^{2} (9,896/sq mi)

Languages
  - Official: Bengali, English
- Time zone: UTC+5:30 (IST)
- PIN: 731214
- Telephone/STD code: 91 3463
- Sex ratio: 843 ♂/♀
- Lok Sabha constituency: Bolpur
- Vidhan Sabha constituency: Bolpur
- Website: birbhum.nic.in

Ilambazar is a census town, with a police station, in Ilambazar CD block in Bolpur subdivision of Birbhum district in the Indian state of West Bengal.

== History ==
Ilambazar developed as a trade centre because of its location at the junction of thoroughfares and the river front. It also had the advantage of being near weaving centres. The British East India Company had a factory at Ilambazar. The French East India Company also made a foray in the Ilambazar area in the 1780s, which drove prices up to the benefit of the weavers. The English assumed direct administration of Birbhum district in 1786.

Birbhum was badly impacted by the Great Bengal famine of 1770. Many villages were wiped out entirely, and even in large towns, over three quarters of households perished. During a peasants' insurrection in June 1789, Ilambazar was sacked, although it recovered and became a magnet for manufacturing and trade. When the district was surveyed by Captain W. S. Sherwill from 1848-1852, the town's population was 2,235.

In the mid 19th century, John Erskine of Ilambazar was one of the leading sugar manufacturers and exporters in the area. Ilambazar was once a significant area for indigo cultivation, traces of which can still be found. The Erskine family also had indigo factories.

== Geography ==
Cities and towns in Bolpur subdivision of Birbhum district
M: municipal city/ town, CT: census town, R: rural/ urban centre, U: University.
Owing to space constraints in the small map, the actual locations in a larger map may vary slightly

=== Location ===
Ilambazar is located at 23.63°N 87.53°E. It has an average elevation of 54 m (177 ft).

Note: The map alongside presents some of the notable locations in the area. All places marked in the map are linked in the larger full screen map.

Ilambazar is located on the northern bank of Ajay River. It is on the four-lane Panagarh–Morgram Highway. The highway has been completed at a cost of $150-million. A road connects to Bolpur/Santiniketan and ( Suri - Kirnahar - Katwa ) Road

Most of the forests in Birbhum district are on laterite soil but the Choupahari sal forests in the Ilambazar area (area 13.9 km^{2}) are on alluvial soil.

=== Police station ===
Ilambazar police station has jurisdiction over Ilambazar CD block.

=== CD block HQ ===
The headquarters of Ilambazar CD block are located at Ilambazar.

== Demographics ==
As per the 2011 Census of India, Ilambazar had a total population of 7,125 of which 3,632 (51%) were males and 3,493 (49%) were females. Population below 6 years was 443. The total number of literates in Ilambazar was 5,246 (82.67% of the population over 6 years).

== Infrastructure ==
As per the District Census Handbook 2011, Ilambazar covered an area of 1.8648 km^{2}. There is a railway station at Bolpur 18 km away. Buses are available in the town. It has 70 km roads and both open and closed drains. The major source of protected water supply is from bore well pumping and over head tank. There are 1,654 domestic electric connections and 100 road light points. Amongst the medical facilities it has 2 hospitals with 280 beds, 4 dispensaries/ health centres and 3 maternity and child welfare centres. Amongst the educational facilities it has are 2 primary schools, 1 secondary school and 1 senior secondary school. Amongst the social, recreational and cultural facilities there is 1 cinema theatre, 1 auditorium/ community hall and 1 public library. It has the branches of 3 nationalised banks, 1 cooperative bank, 1 agricultural credit society and 2 non-agricultural credit societies. Amongst the commodities it produced were rice milling products, bamboo products and kantha stitch products.

== Education ==
Kabi Joydeb Mahavidyalaya was established at Ilambazar in 2007. Affiliated to the University of Burdwan, it offers honours courses in Bengali and English. Illambazar jatiya Yuva Computer Shaksharta Mission is one of the best Computer Training centre at Illambazar, It is a recognised by Government of India and Government of West Bengal.

== Culture ==
=== Temples ===
The Gouranga temple at Ilambazar, and the Shiva temple at Ghurisha are amongst the state protected temples in the area. Rameswara Shiva temple is one of the three temples at Ilambazar with exquisite terracotta work.

During the late 1940s Ilambazar terracotta temples were photo-documented by artist Mukul Dey of Santiniketan.

David J. McCutchion mentions several temples in the Ilambazar area:
(1) the Shiva temple at Ilambazar as a standard (small) 19th century 'Birbhum-Bradhaman' type brick built rekha deul with rich terracotta façade,
(2) the four Shiva temples at Uchkaron as standard (small) char chalas, built in 1769, with rich terracotta facades,
(3) the 19th century Lakshmi-Janardana temple at Ilambazar, as a standard West Bengal type pancharatna with ridged rekha turrets and porch on triple archway,
(4) the 17-18th century Radha Vinode temple at Jaydev Kenduli as a low storied West Bengal navaratna with ridged turrets,
(5) the 19th century Lakshmi Janardana temple at Ghurisha is a straight corniced navaratna with very large upper tower and tiny clustering corner towers with rich terracotta, and
(6) the 19th century temple in the market place at Ilambazar as an octagonal ridged rekha with rich terracotta on all sides.

According to Binoy Ghosh, there are three temples at Ilambazar with beautiful terracotta designs: the hexagonal temple at hattala, the Shiva temple in the village and the pancharatna Narayan temple. There are pictures of British people amongst the terracotta designs. Ghurisa, about 4 miles west of Ilambazar, has rich temple traditions but many of them are in a state of decay. There is a char chala temple, which was constructed in 1555. It is said that there was a golden idol of Rama in the temple, but the Bargis took it away around 1742-48. Moukhira, a village about 3 miles south of Ilambazar, has many early 19th century temples. Benoy Ghosh notes that the portrayal of Europeans in the temple carvings in Birbhum district are more than in other places, perhaps because of the activities of the early European merchants in the area.

=== Temple picture gallery ===
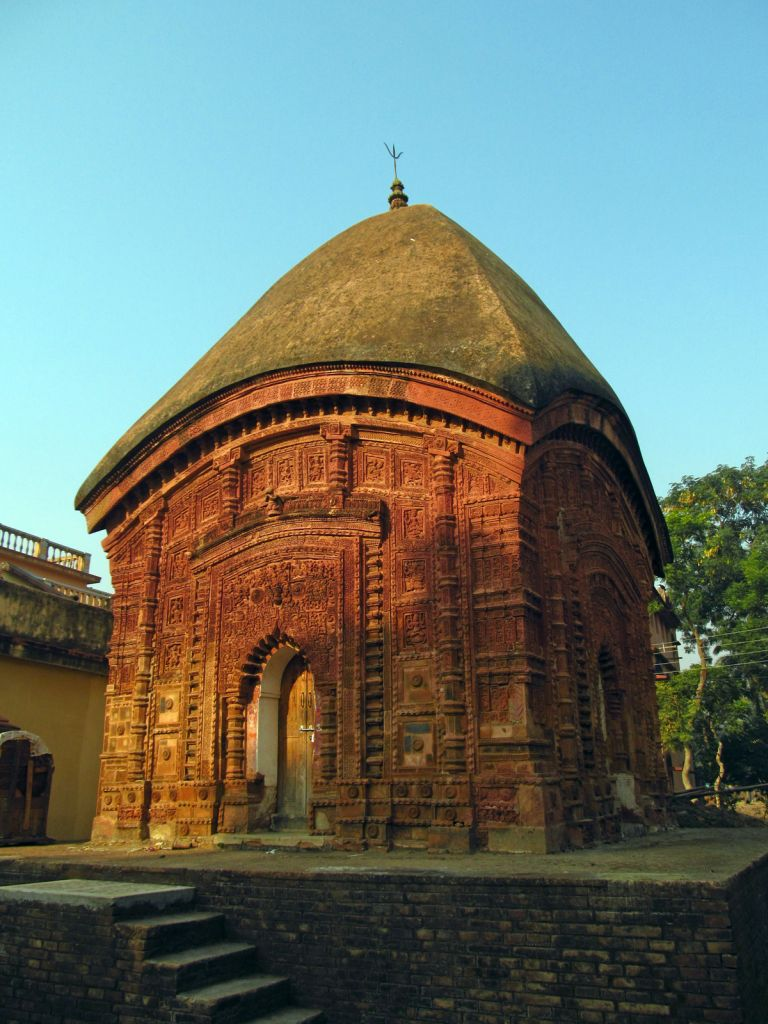
Raghunathji Temple with Shiva deity at Ghurisha

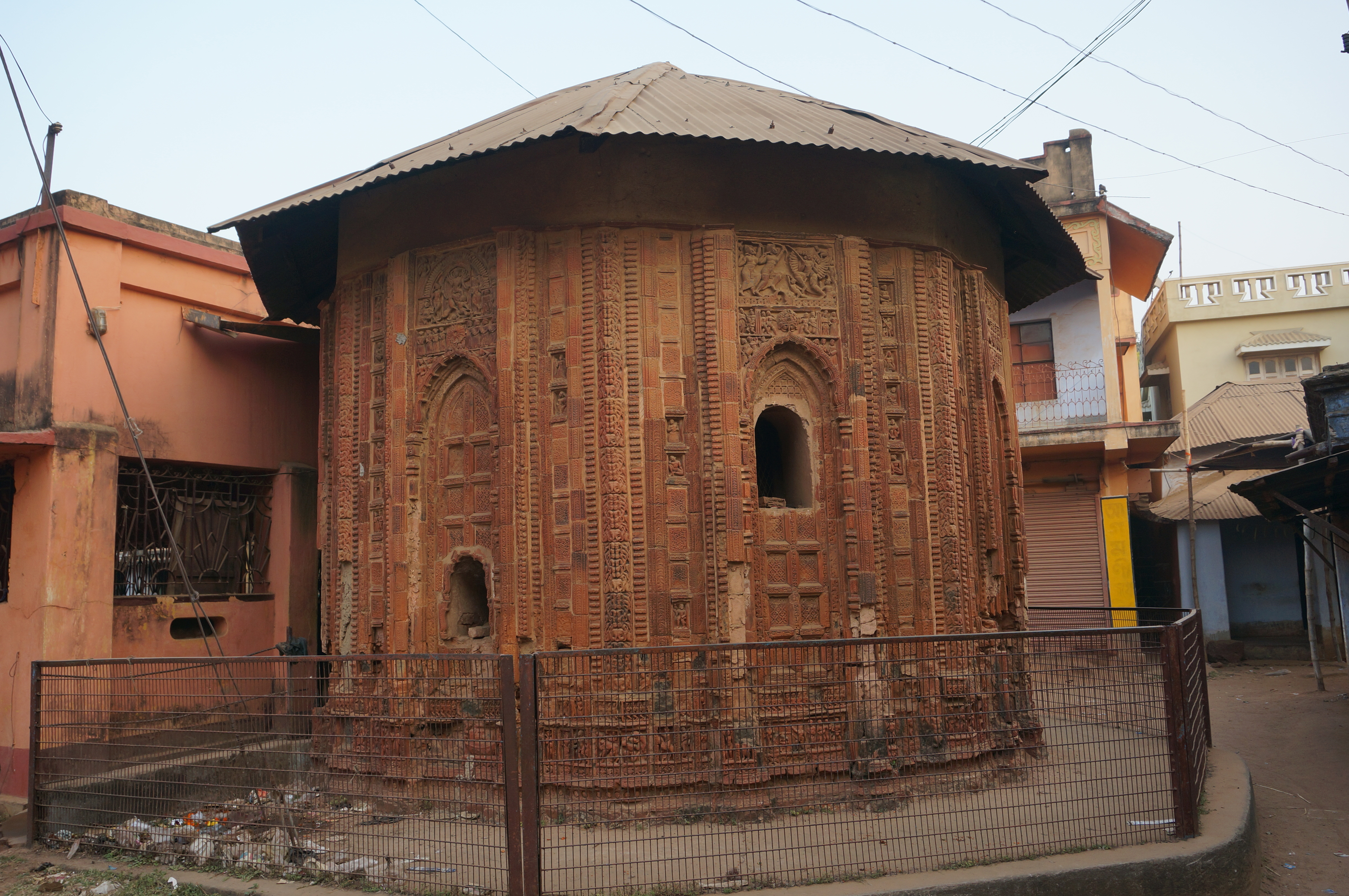
Gouranga temple at Ilambazar

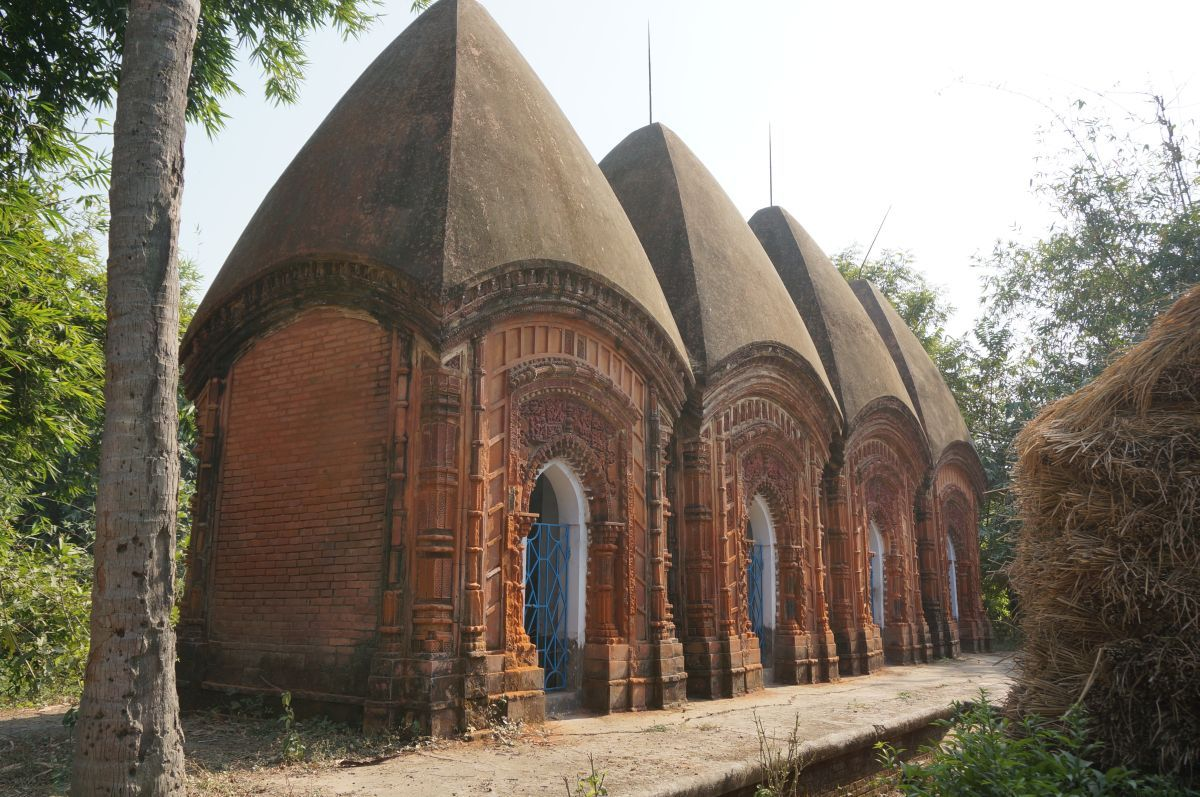
Four Shiva temples at Uchkaron

== Healthcare ==
Ilambazar Rural Hospital at Ilambazar has 30 beds.
