= Bakreshwar River =

River in India

Coordinates: 23°47′50″N 87°46′36″E

Location
- Country: India
- State: Jharkhand, West Bengal
- City: Bakreshwar

Physical characteristics
- Discharge
  - location: Kopai River

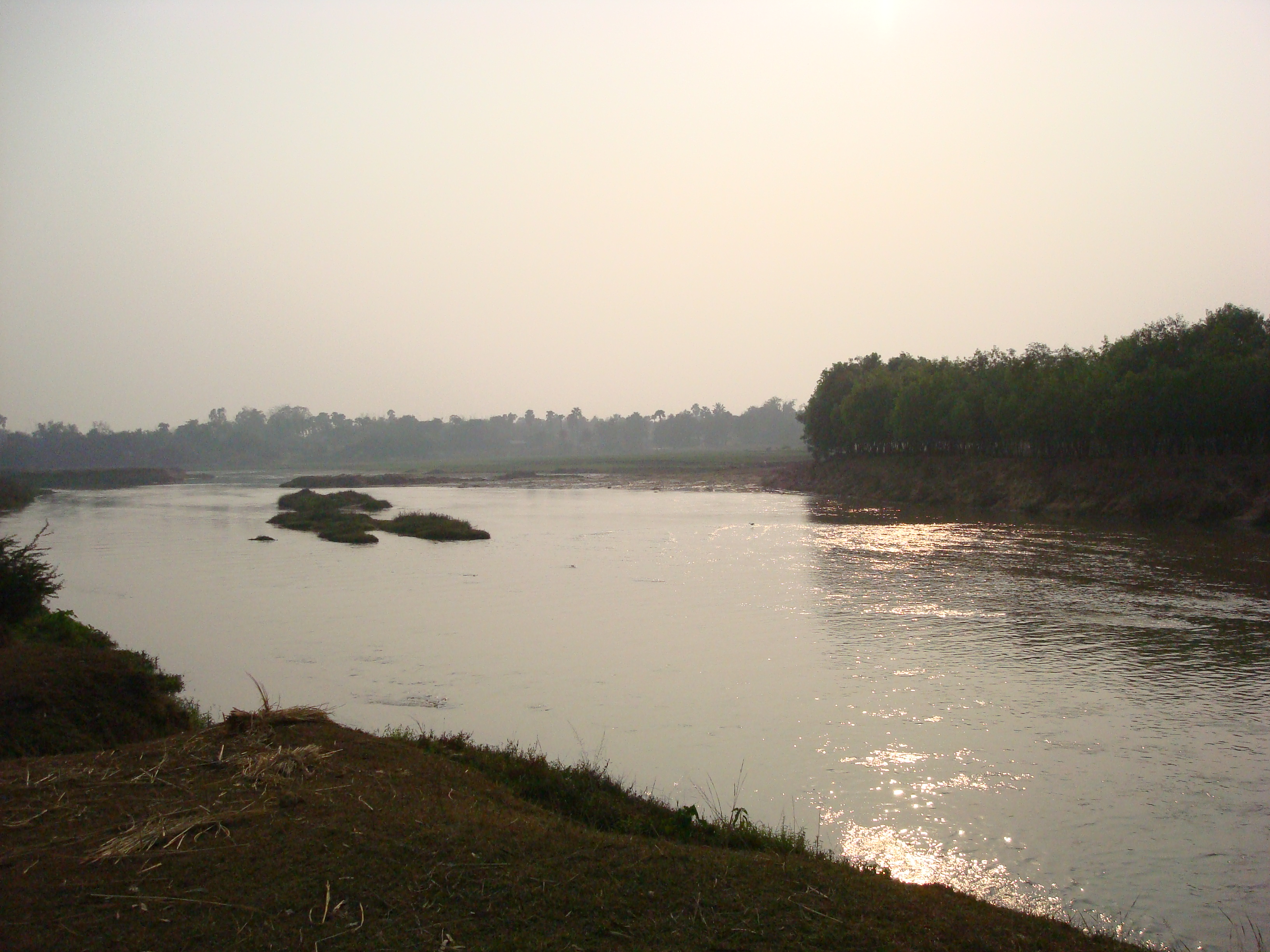
Bakreshwar River

The Bakreshwar River is a tributary of the Mayurakshi River. It originates in Santhal Parganas division of Jharkhand. It then flows through Birbhum district and meets the Kopai River. The combined waters flow into the Mayurakshi River in Murshidabad district.

== Neel Nirjan ==
When traveling along the Panagarh–Morgram Highway one has to turn left a little after Dubrajpur for Bakreshwar Thermal Power Station and its reservoir named Neel Nirjan (meaning blue solitude). It is gaining in popularity as a tourist spot. The thermal power station is near Chinpai.

== Irrigation ==
Bakreshwar canal provides irrigation.
