= Morgram railway station =

Railway Station in West Bengal, India

Morgram

General information
- Location: Fulbari, Morgram, Sagardighi Block, Murshidabad district, West Bengal; India
- Coordinates: 24°18′18″N 88°01′06″E
- Elevation: 23 m (75 ft)
- System: Passenger train station
- Owner: Indian Railways
- Operator: Eastern Railway zone
- Line: Nalhati–Azimganj branch line
- Platforms: 3
- Tracks: 2

Construction
- Structure type: At grade

Other information
- Status: Active
- Station code: MGAE
- Zone(s): Eastern Railway
- Division(s): Howrah

History
- Opened: 1863
- Former names: East Indian Railway Company

Services
| Preceding station | Indian Railways | Following station |
|---|---|---|
| Lohapur towards ? | Eastern Railway zone Nalhati–Azimganj branch line | Sagardighi towards ? |
Location

Morgram railway station is a railway station on Nalhati–Azimganj branch line under the Howrah railway division of Eastern Railway zone. It is situated at Fulbari, Morgram, Sagardighi Block in Murshidabad district in the Indian state of West Bengal.

== History ==
Nalhati–Azimganj branch line connecting Nalhati Junction to Azimganj Junction railway station was opened on 21 December 1863 as Nalhati–Azimganj State railway. This was purchased by the Government of India in 1872. It became a part of the East Indian Railway Company in 1892.
