= Lohapur railway station =

Railway Station in West Bengal, India

Lohapur

General information
- Location: School Road, Lohapur, Birbhum district, West Bengal; India
- Coordinates: 24°18′08″N 87°57′49″E
- Elevation: 34 m (112 ft)
- System: Passenger train station
- Owner: Indian Railways
- Operator: Eastern Railway zone
- Line: Nalhati–Azimganj branch line
- Platforms: 2
- Tracks: 2

Construction
- Structure type: Standard (on ground station)

Other information
- Status: Active
- Station code: LAP
- Zone(s): Eastern Railway zone
- Division(s): Howrah

History
- Opened: 1863
- Former names: East Indian Railway Company

Services
| Preceding station | Indian Railways | Following station |
|---|---|---|
| Takipur towards ? | Eastern Railway zone Nalhati–Azimganj branch line | Morgram towards ? |
Location

Lohapur railway station is a railway station on Nalhati–Azimganj branch line under the Howrah railway division of Eastern Railway zone. It is situated beside School Road at Lohapur in Birbhum district in the Indian state of West Bengal.

== History ==
Nalhati–Azimganj branch line connecting Nalhati Junction to Azimganj Junction railway station was opened on 21 December 1863 as Nalhati–Azimganj State railway. This was purchased by the Government of India in 1872. It became a part of the East Indian Railway Company in 1892.
