= Gosaingram railway station =

Railway Station in West Bengal, India

Gosaingram

General information
- Location: Matiapara, Gosaingram, Murshidabad district, West Bengal; India
- Coordinates: 24°14′53″N 88°12′42″E
- Elevation: 33 m (108 ft)
- System: Passenger train station
- Owner: Indian Railways
- Operator: Eastern Railway zone
- Line: Nalhati–Azimganj branch line
- Platforms: 3
- Tracks: 2

Construction
- Structure type: Standard (on ground station)

Other information
- Status: Active
- Station code: GSGB
- Zone(s): Eastern Railway zone
- Division(s): Howrah

History
- Opened: 1863
- Former names: East Indian Railway Company

Services
Preceding station	Indian Railways	Following station
Barala towards ?	Eastern Railway zone Nalhati–Azimganj branch line	Azimganj City towards ?
Location

Gosaingram railway station is a railway station on Nalhati–Azimganj branch line under the Howrah railway division of Eastern Railway zone. It is situated at Matiapara, Gosaingram in Murshidabad district in the Indian state of West Bengal.

== History ==
Nalhati–Azimganj branch line connecting Nalhati Junction to Azimganj Junction railway station was opened on 21 December 1863 as Nalhati–Azimganj State railway. This was purchased by the Government of India in 1872. It became a part of the East Indian Railway Company in 1892.
