= Jadunath =

Jadunath may refer to

- Jadunath Kisku, Indian politician
- Jadunath Majumdar, Indian journalist and writer
- Jadunath Sarkar, Indian historian
- Jadunath Singh, Indian Army soldier
- Jadunath Sinha, Indian philosopher, writer and religious seeker
- Jadunath Supakar, Indian artist and textile designer
