= Takipur railway station =

Train station in West Bengal

Takipur
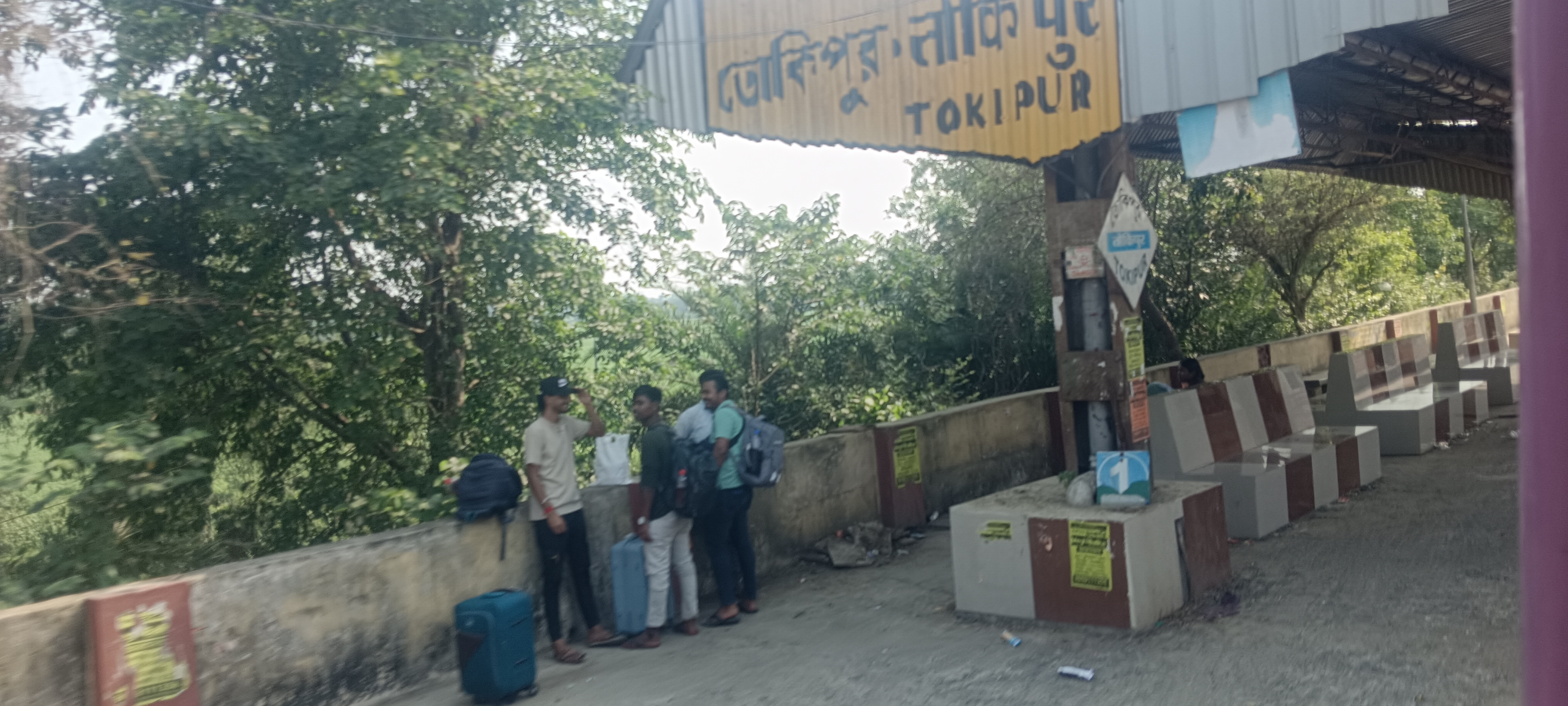
- Takipur railway station

General information
- Location: Near NH 14, Takipur, Birbhum district, West Bengal; India
- Coordinates: 24°18′20″N 87°54′20″E
- Elevation: 40 m (130 ft)
- System: Passenger train station
- Owner: Indian Railways
- Operator: Eastern Railway zone
- Line: Nalhati–Azimganj branch line
- Platforms: 3

Construction
- Structure type: Standard (on ground station)

Other information
- Status: Active
- Station code: TKP
- Zone(s): Eastern Railway zone
- Division(s): Howrah

History
- Former names: East Indian Railway Company

Services
Preceding station	Indian Railways	Following station
Nalhati towards ?	Eastern Railway zone Nalhati–Azimganj branch line	Lohapur towards ?
Location

Takipur railway station (TKP) is located near National Highway 14 in Birbhum district, West Bengal. It has 3 platforms and some local trains stop here. While facilities might be basic, it provides a convenient access point for exploring the surrounding countryside and the historical and cultural attractions of Birbhum. Takipur also features a few local shops and tea stalls catering to passengers.

In 2024, Takipur railway station was renovated with improved platform shelters and digital timetable boards.
