= Nalhati I =

- Community development block
- Interactive map of Nalhati I
- Coordinates: 24.3363°N 87.8134°E
- Country: India
- State: West Bengal
- District: Birbhum
- Parliamentary constituency: Birbhum
- Assembly constituency: Nalhati

Area
  - Total: 249.71 km^{2} (96.41 sq mi)

Population (2011)
  - Total: 204,818
  - Density: 820.22/km^{2} (2,124.4/sq mi)
- Time zone: UTC+5.30 (IST)
- PIN: 731220 (Nalhati)
- Telephone/STD code: 03465
- Literacy Rate: 69.83 per cent
- Website: http://birbhum.nic.in/

Nalhati I is a community development block that forms an administrative division in Rampurhat subdivision of Birbhum district in the Indian state of West Bengal.

== Overview ==
Birbhum district is physiographically a part of the ancient Rarh region. The western portion of the district is basically an extension of the Chota Nagpur Plateau. The area has mostly loose reddish lateritic low fertility soil. In the east, the flood plains of the major rivers, such as the Ajay, Bakreshwar, Mayurakshi and Brahmani, have soft alluvial soil. The forest cover is only 3.5% of the total district. Although coal is found in the district and Bakreshwar Thermal Power Station has a capacity of 2,010 MW, the economic condition of Birbhum is dominated by agriculture. From 1977 onwards, major land reforms took place in West Bengal. Land in excess of a certain limit (the land ceiling) was acquired and distributed amongst the peasants. In Birbhum district, 19,968 hectares of vested agricultural land has been distributed amongst 161,515 beneficiaries, till 2011. However, more than 38% of the operational land holding is marginal or less than 1 acre. The proportion of agricultural labourers amongst total workers in Birbhum district is 45.9%, the highest amongst all districts of West Bengal. Culturally rich Birbhum, with such traditional landmarks as Jaydev Kenduli and Chandidas Nanoor, is home to Visva-Bharati University at Santiniketan, having close association with two Nobel laureates – Rabindranath Tagore and Amartya Sen.

== Geography ==
Map of Birbhum district showing community development blocks and municipal areas. Click on the map to view a larger version.

Banior, a constituent panchayat of Nalhati I block, is located at 24°20′11″N 87°48′48″E.

Nalhati I block is mostly part of the Nalhati Plain, one of the four sub-micro physiographic regions occupying the northern portion of Birbhum district. There are hills along the western boundary with Jharkhand. These are extensions of the Rajmahal hills.

Baidhara Barrage, across the Brahmani river, has a capacity of 540,000 cubic metres (440 acre⋅ft),

Nalhati I community development block is bounded by Murarai I and Murarai II CD blocks on the north, Nalhati II CD block on the east, Rampurhat I and Rampurhat II CD blocks on the south and Maheshpur and Pakuria CD blocks, in Pakur district of Jharkhand, on the west.

Nalhati I CD block has an area of 249.71 km^{2}. It has 1 panchayat samity, 9 gram panchayats, 92 gram sansads (village councils), 99 mouzas and 94 inhabited villages, according to the District Statistical Handbook Birbhum 2008. Nalhati police station serves this block. The headquarters of this CD block is at Nalhati.

The gram panchayats of Nalhati I block/panchayat samiti are: Banior, Bautia, Borla, Haridaspur, Kaitha I, Kaitha II, Kalitha, Kurumgram and Paikpara.

== Demographics ==
=== Population ===
As per the 2011 Census of India, Nalhati I CD Block had a total population of 204,818, all of which were rural. There were 105,070 (51%) males and 99,748 (49%) females. The population below 6 years was 13,736. Scheduled Castes numbered 73,768 (36.02%) and Scheduled Tribes numbered 10,219 (4.99%).

As per 2001 census, Nalhati I block had a total population of 209,314, out of which 107,901 were males and 101,413 were females. Nalhati I block registered a population growth of 19.92 per cent during the 1991-2001 decade. Decadal growth for Birbhum district was 17.88 per cent. Decadal growth in West Bengal was 17.84 per cent.

Large villages (with 4,000+ population) in Nalhati I CD Block are (2011 census figures in brackets): Banior (5,369), Bhabanandapur (4,178), Lakshminarayanpur (4,659), Tejhati (4,002), Mehagram (5,731), Haripur Podhra (4,175), Paikpara (9,993), Madhura (5,996), Amaypur (5,376), Dharampur (4,652), Bujunga (7,198), Kaytha (13,154), Bhelian (5,901) and Gosainpur (4,980).

Other villages in Nalhati I CD Block include (2011 census figures in brackets): Bautia (2,694), Haridaspur (2,856), Kalitha (3,711) and Kurumgram (3,728).

=== Literacy ===
As per the 2011 census the total number of literate residents in Nalhati I CD Block was 133,428 (69.83% of the population over 6 years) out of which males numbered 73,413 (80.90% of the male population over 6 years) and females numbered 60,015 (69.78% of the female population over 6 years). The gender disparity (the difference between female and male literacy rates) was 11.12%.

See also: List of West Bengal districts ranked by literacy rate

Literacy in CD blocks of
Birbhum district
Rampurhat subdivision
Murarai I – 55.67%
Murarai II – 58.28%
Nalhati I – 69.83%
Nalhati II – 71.68%
Rampurhat I – 73.29%
Rampurhat II – 70.77%
Mayureswar I – 71.52%
Mayureswar II – 70.89%
Suri Sadar subdivision
Mohammad Bazar – 65.18%
Rajnagar – 68.10%
Suri I – 72.75%
Suri II – 72.75%
Sainthia – 72.33%
Dubrajpur – 68.26%
Khoyrasol – 68.75%
Bolpur subdivision
Bolpur Sriniketan – 70.67%
Ilambazar – 74.27%
Labpur – 71.20%
Nanoor – 69.45%
2011 Census: CD Block Wise

Primary Census Abstract Data

=== Language and religion ===
Religion in Nalhati I CD block (2011)
| Hinduism | 52.11% |
| Islam | 46.64% |
| Christianity | 0.88% |
| Other or not stated | 0.37% |

In the 2011 census, Hindus numbered 106,738 and formed 52.11% of the population in Nalhati I CD Block. Muslims numbered 95,521 and formed 46.64% of the population. Christians numbered 1,793 and formed 0.88% of the population. Others numbered 766 and formed 0.37% of the population.

The proportion of Hindus in Birbhum district has declined from 72.2% in 1961 to 62.3% in 2011. The proportion of Muslims in Birbhum district has increased from 27.6% to 37.1% during the same period. Christians formed 0.3% in 2011.

Languages in Nalhati I CD block (2011)
1. Bengali (94.8%)
2. Santali (4.90%)
3. Others (0.34%)

At the time of the 2011 census, 94.76% of the population spoke Bengali and 4.90% Santali as their first language.

== Rural poverty ==
As per the BPL household survey carried out in 2005, the proportion of households below the poverty line (BPL) in Nalhati I CD Block was 42.8%, against 42.3% in Birbhum district. In six CD Blocks – Murarai II, Nalhati II, Rampurhat II, Rampurhat I, Suri II and Murarai I – the proportion of BPL families was more than 50%. In three CD Blocks – Rajnagar, Suri I and Labhpur – the proportion of BPL families was less than 30%. The other ten CD Blocks in Birbhum district were placed in between. According to the District Human Development Report, Birbhum, "Although there is no indication that the share of BPL households is more in blocks with higher share of agricultural labourer, there is a clear pattern that the share of BPL households is more in blocks with disadvantaged population in general and Muslim population in particular." (The disadvantaged population includes scheduled castes, scheduled tribes, and Muslims).

== Economy ==
=== Livelihood ===
Livelihood
in Nalhati I CD Block
1. Cultivators (21.8%)
2. Agricultural labourers (53.2%)
3. Household industries (2.82%)
4. Other Workers (22.2%)

In Nalhati I CD Block in 2011, amongst the class of total workers, cultivators numbered 15,844 and formed 21.82%, agricultural labourers numbered 38,624 and formed 53.18%, household industry workers numbered 2,048 and formed 2.82% and other workers numbered 16,107and formed 22.18%. Total workers numbered 72,623 and formed 35.46% of the total population, and non-workers numbered 132,195 and formed 64.54% of the population.

Note: In the census records a person is considered a cultivator, if the person is engaged in cultivation/ supervision of land owned by self/government/institution. When a person who works on another person’s land for wages in cash or kind or share, is regarded as an agricultural labourer. Household industry is defined as an industry conducted by one or more members of the family within the household or village, and one that does not qualify for registration as a factory under the Factories Act. Other workers are persons engaged in some economic activity other than cultivators, agricultural labourers and household workers. It includes factory, mining, plantation, transport and office workers, those engaged in business and commerce, teachers, entertainment artistes and so on.

=== Infrastructure ===
There are 89 inhabited villages in Nalhati I CD Block, as per District Census Handbook, Birbhum, 2011. 100% villages have power supply. 87 villages (97.75%) have drinking water supply. 21 villages (23.60%) have post offices. 87 villages (97.75%) have telephones (including landlines, public call offices and mobile phones). 31 villages (31.83%) have a pucca (paved) approach road and 25 villages (28.09%) have transport communication (includes bus service, rail facility and navigable waterways). 15 villages (16.85%) have agricultural credit societies and 4 villages (4.49%) have banks.

=== Agriculture ===
Following land reforms land ownership pattern has undergone transformation. In 2004-05 (the agricultural labourer data is for 2001), persons engaged in agriculture in Nalhati I CD Block could be classified as follows: bargadars 6,457 (10.78%), patta (document) holders 6,075 (10.14%), small farmers (possessing land between 1 and 2 hectares) 6,829 (11.40%), marginal farmers (possessing land up to 1 hectare) 12,682 (21.18%) and agricultural labourers 27,839 (46.49%).

Birbhum is a predominantly paddy cultivation-based agricultural district. The area under paddy cultivation in 2010-11 was 249,000 hectares of land. Paddy is grown in do, suna and sali classes of land. There is double to triple cropping system for paddy cultivation. Other crops grown in Birbhum are gram, masuri, peas, wheat, linseed, khesari, til, sugarcane and occasionally cotton. 192,470 hectares of cultivable land is under irrigation by different sources, such as canals, tanks, river lift irrigation and different types of tubewells. In 2009-10, 158,380 hectares were irrigated by canal water. There are such major irrigation projects as Mayurakshi and Hijli. Other rivers such as Ajoy, Brahmani, Kuskurni, Dwaraka, Hingla and Kopai are also helpful for irrigation in the district.

Various agriculture development work has been initiated since March 2016 such as farmers training meeting programme, collection of soil sample, successful crop demonstration, cheque distribution to farmers affected by flood, rainfall or any other natural calamities etc. by the Office of the Assistant Director of Agriculture, Nalhati-I block.

In 2013-14, there were 74 fertiliser depots, 10 seed stores and 66 fair price shops in Nalhati I CD block.

In 2013-14, Nalhati I CD block produced 3,145 tonnes of Aman paddy, the main winter crop, from 1,131 hectares, 544 tonnes of Aus paddy (summer crop) from 207 hectares, 6,157 tonnes of Boro paddy (spring crop) from 1,808 hectares, 10,451 tonnes of wheat from 3,826 hectares, 65,997 tonnes of potatoes from 2,574 hectares and 1,810 tonnes of Sugar cane from 24 hectares. It also produced pulses and oilseeds.

In 2013-14, the total area irrigated in Nalhati I CD block was 12,240 hectares, out of which 4,400 hectares were irrigated by canal water, 1,750 hectares by tank water, 675 hectares by river lift irrigation, 5,208 hectares by deep tube wells, 200 hectares by shallow tube wells and 7 hectares by open dug wells.

=== Banking ===
In 2013-14, Nalhati I CD block had offices of 10 commercial banks and 4 gramin banks.

=== Other sectors ===
According to the District Human Development Report, 2009, Birbhum is one of the most backward districts of West Bengal in terms of industrial development. Of the new industrial projects set-up in West Bengal between 1991 and 2005, only 1.23% came to Birbhum. Bakreshwar Thermal Power Station is the only large-scale industry in the district and employs about 5,000 people. There are 4 medium-scale industries and 4,748 registered small-scale industries.

The proportion of workers engaged in agriculture in Birbhum has been decreasing. According to the District Human Development Report, “more people are now engaged in non-agricultural activities, such as fishing, retail sales, vegetable vending, selling milk, and so on. As all these activities are at the lower end of the spectrum of marketable skills, it remains doubtful if these activities generate enough return for their family’s sustenance.”

=== Backward Regions Grant Fund ===
Birbhum district is listed as a backward region and receives financial support from the Backward Regions Grant Fund. The fund, created by the Government of India, is designed to redress regional imbalances in development. As of 2012, 272 districts across the country were listed under this scheme. The list includes 11 districts of West Bengal.

== Transport ==
Nalhati I CD block has 6 originating/ terminating bus routes.

The Khana-Barharwa section of Sahibganj loop passes through this block. There is a station at Nalhati.

Nalhati-Azimganj branch line originates from Nalhati. There also is a station at Takipur.

SH 7, running from Rajgram to Midnapore, and NH 14, running from Morgram to Kharagpur, passes through this block.

== Culture ==
Nalhati is one of the Shakta pithas. The Lalateswari temple is located atop a small hillock.

== Education ==
In 2013-14, Nalhati I CD block had 129 primary schools with 12,705 students, 12 middle schools with 1.924 students, 11 high schools with 12,327 students and 9 higher secondary schools with 11,011 students. Nalhati I CD Block had 1 technical/ professional institution with 100 students and 402 institutions for special and non-formal education with 13,884 students. Nalhati municipal area had 2 general degree colleges (outside the CD block).

As per the 2011 census, in Nalhati I CD Block, amongst the 89 inhabited villages, 3 villages did not have a school, 41 villages had more than 1 primary school, 38 villages had at least 1 primary and 1 middle school and 22 villages had at least 1 middle and 1 secondary school. 13 villages had senior secondary schools.

== Healthcare ==
In 2014, Nalhati I CD Block had 1 rural hospital, 3 primary health centres and 1 private nursing home with total 71 beds and 4 doctors (excluding private bodies). It had 35 family welfare subcentres. 6,292 patients were treated indoor and 83,665 patients were treated outdoor in the hospitals, health centres and subcentres of the CD block.

As per 2011 census, in Nalhati I CD Block, 2 villages had community health centres, 4 villages had primary health centres, 34 villages had primary health subcentres, 3 villages had maternity and child welfare centres, 2 villages had veterinary hospitals, 12 villages had medicine shops and out of the 89 inhabited villages 30 villages had no medical facilities.

Nalhati Rural Hospital at Nalhati has 30 beds. There are primary health centres at Kaitha (6 beds), Kurumgram (6 beds) and Sonarkundu (10 beds).
