= Sagardighi, Murshidabad =

Sagardighi
- Town
- Location in West Bengal, India Sagardighi (India)
- Coordinates: 24.2943°N 88.0849°E
- Country: India
- State: West Bengal
- District: Murshidabad

Government
  - Administrative Division: Malda

Languages
  - Official: Bengali, English
- Time zone: UTC+5:30 (IST)
- PIN: 742226 (Sagardighi) = 742237 (Kabilpur)
- Lok Sabha constituency: Jangipur
- Vidhan Sabha constituency: Sagardighi
- Website: murshidabad.gov.in

Sagardighi is a town situated in the Sagardighi CD block in the Jangipur subdivision of Murshidabad district in the state of West Bengal, India.

== History ==
It is revealed by the Period of Excavation: 988-1038 A.D. by Mahipaldeva (I) that it was an ancient place. In Pala reign (750-1170 A.D.) Sagardighi was one of the main centres of Buddhist religion. After this in medieval period i.e., in Pathan age (First phase of 13th century) Sagardighi was an important place. Sagar means sea, whereas Dighi is lake. It is a lake like a sea. Length and breadth of this lake are 1.5 and 1 kilometre respectively. There is a temple in the proper centre (under the water) of the lake whose steeple has been found when water level is decreased.

== Geography ==
Cities, towns and locations in the southern portion of Jangipur subdivision, Murshidabad district (including Suti I, Raghunathganj I, Raghunathganj II, Sagardighi CD blocks)
M: municipal town, CT: census town, R: rural/ urban centre, F: Facility
Abbreviation- TPS: Thermal Power Station, AMU: Aligarh Muslim University
Owing to space constraints in the small map, the actual locations in a larger map may vary slightly

=== Location ===
Sagardighi is located at 24.2943°N 88.0849°E.

=== Area overview ===
Jangipur subdivision is crowded with 52 census towns and as such it had to be presented in two location maps. One of the maps can be seen alongside. The subdivision is located in the Rarh region that is spread over from adjoining Santhal Pargana division of Jharkhand. The land is slightly higher in altitude than the surrounding plains and is gently undulating. The river Ganges, along with its distributaries, is prominent in both the maps. At the head of the subdivision is the 2,245 m long Farakka Barrage, one of the largest projects of its kind in the country. Murshidabad district shares with Bangladesh a porous international border which is notoriously crime prone (partly shown in this map). The subdivision has two large power plants - the 2,100 MW Farakka Super Thermal Power Station and the 1,600 MW Sagardighi Thermal Power Station. According to a 2016 report, there are around 1,000,000 (1 million/ ten lakh) workers engaged in the beedi industry in Jangipur subdivision. 90% are home-based and 70% of the home-based workers are women. As of 2013, an estimated 2.4 million people reside along the banks of the Ganges alone in Murshidabad district. Severe erosion occurs along the banks.

Note: The two maps present some of the notable locations in the subdivision. All places marked in the maps are linked in the larger full screen maps.

== Civic administration ==
=== Police station ===
Sagardighi police station has jurisdiction over Sagardighi CD block.

=== CD block HQ ===
The headquarters of Sagardighi community development block CD block are located at Sagardighi.

== Transport ==
Sagardighi railway station is situated on the Nalhati-Azimganj branch line. South Bengal State Transport Corporation operates daily bus services from Berhampore to Raghunathganj via Sagaardighi.There are also many private buses Berhampore -Sukhi- Sagardighi- Manigram- Raghunathganj.

== Education ==
Sagardighi Kamada Kinkar Smriti Mahavidyalaya was established in 2008 at Sagardighi. It offers honours courses in Bengali, English, Sanskrit, Arabic, history, geography, political science, philosophy and education. There are two higher secondary schools located in Sagardighi. One is Sagardighi S.N High school and the other one is Sagardighi Girls' High School.

== Healthcare ==
Sagardighi Super Speciality Hospital functions with 200+ beds.
