= Lohapur =

- Village
- Location in West Bengal, India Lohapur (India)
- Coordinates: 24.31212°N 87.962141°E
- Country: India
- State: West Bengal
- District: Birbhum

Population (2011)
  - Total: 4,133

Languages
  - Official: Bengali, English
- Time zone: UTC+5:30 (IST)
- PIN: 731237 (Lohapur)
- Telephone/STD code: 03465
- Lok Sabha constituency: Birbhum
- Vidhan Sabha constituency: Hansan
- Website: birbhum.nic.in

Lohapur is a village in Nalhati II CD block in Rampurhat subdivision of Birbhum district in the Indian state of West Bengal.

== History ==
=== Bhadrapur ===
Bhadrapur is a village with Gram Panchayat. It has links with Maharaja Nandakumar, is about 4–5 miles from Lohapur railway station. Maharaja Nandakumar was born around 1705 at Bhadrapur. The ruins of the Raj bari can be seen there. Bhadrapur is culturally and educationally an enriched village in the Lohapur Block. Bhadrapur is also quite famous for its Durga Puja. The Banerjee Thakur Bari puja is one of the grand and glorious puja of the village Bhadrapur, this Durga Puja commenced 400 years back. And it itself is a grandeur. At Akalipur, nearby, on the banks of the Brahmani River there is a Kali temple dedicated to Maa Guhya Kali, built by Maharaja Nandakumar.

=== Baragram ===
Baragram is located near Lohapur railway station. It is a predominantly Muslim village. There are graves of many pirs and Muslim religious persons in this village – Lohajang, Sultan Shah, Nangta Shah, Jamal Shah, Makhdum Zilani, Makhdom Husseini, Syed Shah, Hossain Ali, Muharam Ali, Lang Shah, Darab Shah and others. Many of them came from places in the Middle-east or Central Asia, but a vast majority of the population were local converts to Islam. Over the years, the local people have been digging out numerous stone idols from all around. Most of these seem to be belonging to the Pala era. There are a large number of idols of Hindu deities but the majority are Buddhist deities, including a number of figures showing Buddha in the vajrasana pose. Many of the idols were damaged in the process of crude methods of recovery. These recoveries lead to the belief that the area was once dominated by Buddhists, who converted to Islam.

Binoy Ghosh opines that the main centres of Buddhism were in eastern and northern Bengal, and it was easier to convert them to Islam because of the strong anti-Hindu mentality that the Buddhists had. Such centres were rare in western Bengal. He also notes the strong feelings of amity between Hindus and a fairly large Muslim population that he observed in Rampurhat subdivision.

== Geography ==
Cities and towns in Rampurhat subdivision of Birbhum district
M: municipal city/ town, CT: census town, R: rural/ urban centre.
Owing to space constraints in the small map, the actual locations in a larger map may vary slightly

=== CD block HQ ===
The headquarters of Nalhati II CD block are located at Lohapur.

=== Overview ===
The northern portion of Rampurhat subdivision (shown in the map alongside) is part of the Nalhati Plains, a sub-micro physiographic region, and the southern portion is part of the Brahmani-Mayurakshi Basin, another sub-micro physiographic region occupying the area between the Brahmani in the north and the Mayurakshi in the south. There is an occasional intrusion of Rajmahal Hills, from adjoining Santhal Parganas, towards the north-western part of the subdivision. On the western side is Santhal Parganas and the border between West Bengal and Jharkhand can be seen in the map. Murshidabad district is on the eastern side. A small portion of the Padma River and the border with Bangladesh (thick line) can be seen in the north-eastern corner of the map. 96.62% of the population of Rampurhat subdivision live the rural areas and 3.38% of the population live in the urban areas.

Note: The map alongside presents some of the notable locations in the area. All places marked in the map are linked in the larger full screen map.

== Demographics ==
As per the 2011 Census of India, Lohapur had a total population of 4,133 of which 2,152 (52%) were males and 1,981 (48%) were females. Population below 6 years was 568. The total number of literates in Lohapur was 2,262 (74.67% of the population over 6 years).

== Transport ==
Lohapur is off National Highway 14, running from Morgram (in Murshidabad district) to Kharagpur (in Paschim Medinipur district) and State Highway 7 running from Rajgram (in Birbhum district) to Midnapore (in Paschim Medinipur district) (it is a common route in this section).

Lohapur railway station is situated at Lohapur on the Nalhati-Azimganj branch line.

== Post Office ==
Lohapur has a delivery sub post office, with PIN 731237, under Rampurhat head office. Branch offices using the same PIN are situated at Bandhkhola, Bara, Bhadrapur, Gopalchak, Jesthabhanipur, Kantagoria, Krishnapur, Noapara, Salisand, Sitalpur and Ujirpur.

== Healthcare ==
Lohapur Block Primary Health Centre at Lohapur has 15 beds.
