= Supakar =

Supakar is an Odia surname. Notable people with the surname include:

- Jadunath Supakar (1931–?), Indian artist
- Shraddhakar Supakar (1914–1993), Indian politician, social activist, and author
