= Banior =

- Village
- Location in West Bengal, India Banior (India)
- Coordinates: 24.3374°N 87.8132°E
- Country: India
- State: West Bengal
- District: Birbhum
- Elevation: 54 m (177 ft)

Population (2011)
  - Total: 5,369

Languages
  - Official: Bengali, English
- Time zone: UTC+5:30 (IST)
- PIN: 731243
- Telephone/STD code: 03465
- Website: birbhum.nic.in

Banior is a village and gram panchayat in Nalhati I Block in Rampurhat subdivision of Birbhum District in the Indian state of West Bengal. The other regional name of Banior is Banur।

== Geography ==
=== Location ===
Banior has an average elevation of 40 metres. It is on an extension of the Chota Nagpur Plateau. A few small hills with low altitude can be visible outside the village. The soil of this part of Birbhum is lateritic and this area is locally known as "Lalmatir Desh".

Nalhati, the CD Block headquarters, is 4 km away from Banior.

=== Gram panchayat ===
Villages in Banior gram panchayat are: Bahadurpur, Banior, Bankpara, Barsar, Bhola, Chandipur, Gobindapur, Jot Gobindapur, Madna, Pusur, Raghabbati, Sanketpur and Sultanpur.

=== Places of interest ===
Places of interest in Banior are Roychaudhury Bari Durga Mandir, Roychaudhury Bari Narayan Mandir, Roychaudhury Bari Kali Tala(math), Roychaudhury Bari Shib Mandir, Roychaudhury Bari Sasti Tala, Mondalpara Durga Mandit, Durga Puja celebration, Shoni Debotar Mandir and Roychaudhury zamindar bari.Banior Roy Bari Durga Mandir, Chaudhuri Bari Durga Mandir.

Durga Puja of Banior Roychaudhury Bari is one of the oldest and famous Durga Pujas in West Bengal. The Roychaudhury Bari Durga Temple was established by Sri Ratneswar Roychaudhury- the Zaminder of then Banior. Many beliefs and myths are engaged among the local common people with this traditional Durga Puja of Banior Roychaudhury Bari. Roychaudhury Durga temple is situated in Kayastha Para in Banior Village. In Banior Village, there is a temple of Kali Maa which was established by Late Zamindar Ratneswar Roychaudhury. At present (2019) Sri Jagannath Roychaudhury is the eldest descendant of Ratneswar Roychaudhury. This Durga Puja is about 400 years old and one of the most grand, gorgeous, biggest and oldest pujas of Bengal which attracts hundreds of devotees and tourists from different parts of Bengal every year in the grand occasion of Durga Puja.

Banior Roy Bari Durga pujo is around 200 years old. It was started by Shri Kulodaprasad Roy ( Mukhopadhyay). The main attraction of this pujo is Kumari pujo . In this pujo annavog is served to Maa Durga.

== Demographics ==
As per the 2011 Census of India, Banior had a total population of 5,369 of which 2,781 (52%) were males and 2,588 (48%) were females. Population below 6 years was 724. The total number of literates in Banior was 3,613 (77.78% of the population over 6 years).

== Education ==
One Higher Secondary School named Banior Aswini Kumar High School (HS)(ESTB-1964), 4 Primary School, 1 Saraswati Sisu Mandir(ESTB-2007) and few Aganwari Schools.
