= Kurumgram =

Kurumgram Village
- Village, Gram Panchayat
- Location in West Bengal, India
- Coordinates: 24.2436°N 87.8758°E
- Country: India
- State: West Bengal
- District: Birbhum

Government
  - Type: Gram Panchayet
  - MP: Satabdi Roy
  - MLA: Moinuddin Shams

Area
  - Total: 4.04 km^{2} (1.56 sq mi)
- Elevation: 40 m (130 ft)

Population (2011)
  - Total: 3,728
  - Density: 923/km^{2} (2,390/sq mi)

Languages
  - Official: Bengali, English
- Time zone: UTC+5:30 (IST)
- PIN: 731242
- Telephone Code: +91-3465
- Vehicle registration: WB-45, WB-46
- Lok Sabha constituency: Birbhum
- Vidhan Sabha constituency: Nalhati
- Website: birbhum.nic.in

Kurumgram is an old village located in Nalhati I community development block in the Rampurhat subdivision of Birbhum district in West Bengal, a state of India.

== Geography ==
The total geographical area of Kurumgram village is 4.04 km^{2} and it is the 15th largest village by area in the sub district. Kurumgram is located at an altitude is 40 meters above sea level. The time zone is Indian Standard Time (GMT+5:30).

Kurumgram is located 60 km north of the district headquarters of Suri, Birbhum. It is also 10 km from Nalhati town, 13 km from Rampurhat, and 225 km from the state capital Kolkata. The other cities nearby are Sainthia (45 km), Baharampur (60 km) and Bolpur (80 km). The Tarapith Tara Maa Temple is near to Kurumgram (22 km). The historic Lalbagh and Murshidabad are also not very far from Kurumgram (65 km). The nearby villages of Kurumgram are Kanupara, Sardha, Mehegram, Tejhati, Bujung, Dharampur, Barla, Raghunathpur, Gayta, Belun, Sadashibpur, Kanaipur etc.

=== Administrative & postal address ===
- Gram Panchayat- Kurumgram Gram Panchayat.
- Police Station- Nalhati.
- Block Office - Nalhati I (community development block).
- Sub Divisional Office- Rampurhat subdivision.
- Assembly constituency- Nalhati (Vidhan Sabha constituency).
- Lok Sabha constituency- Birbhum (Lok Sabha constituency).
- Post Office- Kurumgram.
- PIN Code- 731242.
- STD Code- 03465 (Nalhati)
- District Headquarter- Suri, Birbhum.
- Divisional Headquarter- Burdwan.

== Demographics ==
According to the 2011 Census of India, Kurumgram is a large village with a total of 932 families, with an average of 4 persons in every family. The village has a population of 3728, of which 1903 are males (51%) while 1825 are females (49%). There are 410 children of age 0-6, which make up 11% of the total population of the village; among them 52% are boys and 48% are girls. The population density of the village is 923 persons per km^{2}. 24% of the total population in this village are General caste, 76% are Schedule caste.

Kurumgram has a higher literacy rate compared to the average for West Bengal(76.26%). In 2011, the literacy rate of Kurumgram was 77.73%. Male literacy stood at 83.44% while female literacy rate was 71.79%.

Out of the total population of the village, 1249 were engaged in work activities. Among them, 54% of the male population and 13% of the female population are working population. 78.38% of workers describe their work as Main Work (Employment or Earning more than 6 Months) while 21.62% were involved in Marginal activity providing livelihood for less than 6 months. Of 1249 workers engaged in Main Work, 104 were cultivators (owner or co-owner) while 517 were Agricultural labourers.

Particulars	Total	Male	Female
Total No. of Houses	932	-	-
Population	3728	1903	1825
Child (0-6)	410	212	198
Schedule Caste	2844	1455	1389
Schedule Tribe	0	0	0
Literacy	77.73%	83.44%	71.79%
Total Workers	1249	1020	229
Main Worker	979	0	0
Marginal Worker	270	199	71

The local language is Bengali. The other languages also spoken in Kurumgram are English and Hindi.

== Government and politics ==
The main four political parties in Kurumgram are All India Trinamool Congress (TMC), Bharatiya Janata Party (BJP), Indian National Congress (INC) and Communist Party of India (Marxist) (CPIM).

== Culture ==
Almost all Hindu festivals are celebrated. The Durga Puja, Kali Puja & Saraswati Puja are the three most celebrated festivals by the villagers.

- Durga Puja is celebrated in the month of October–November. This is the biggest festival of the villagers. There are total 7 Durga Idols are worshiped during the four days of Puja in Kurumgram. Out of the 7 Pujas 4 of them are worshiped in Temple & 3 of them are worshiped in the Pandals. People from nearby villages get together and enjoy all the festivals.
- As soon as the Durga Puja ends the villagers gets ready for the Kali Puja without taking any rest. The festival of India, the festival of lights "Diwali" is celebrated in the month of October/November after 21 days of Vijayadashami. Almost all the houses of Kurumgram are decorated with lights and lamps. Many Kali Idols are worshiped in Kurumgram. Among them there are four Puja Committees in Kurumgram who decorate their Pandals with various "themes". In that time many people from nearby villages come to Kurumgram to visit the "Theme Puja" pandals.
- Saraswati Puja is Celebrated in the month of January/February. Saraswati is the Hindu Goddess of Knowledge. It is celebrated with a big village fair (Mela) which stays for 7 days. Many people from outside come to Kurumgram to visit and enjoy the fair (Mela) with family and friends by buying various things, and eating together in restaurants and with adventurous rides. Many cultural programmes are held then by the local Clubs like drama, singing, dance etc..
- Beside that Raksha Kali Puja and Nabanna is also celebrated with much pomp and grandeur. Raksha Kali Puja is celebrated on first Saturday of April. Thousands of people gather there in Raksha Kali Temple of Kurumgram on that day. Nabanna is usually celebrated in the month of November/December.
- Besides the festivals the villagers celebrates the Independence Day (15 August), Republic Day (26 January) and the birthdays of the great National Heroes, Literary Persons, Scientist and Spiritual Heroes with organising cultural programmes.

== History ==
The village was founded in the 16th century by Garur Mitra. Further development of the village was done by Arjun Mitra Majumdar, grandson of Garur Mitra. The name of the village is based on the word Kurma (Tortoise in Sanskrit), since the initial landscape of the village resembled the body of a tortoise.

== Transport ==
- By Road Service- There are 7 private buses to connect the village with Rampurhat directly & among these buses 1 bus goes Suri. Nearest National Highway is NH-60 (Morgram to Panagarh via Nalhati, Rampurhat, Suri, Dubrajpur, Ilambazar) which goes through Tejhati village which is 5 km towards west from Kurumgram. Kurumgram is connected with NH-60 through Sardha-Kurumgram-Tejhati road (12 ft width) which is maintained by the Government of West Bengal. Beside buses there are many "Toto Rikshas" available from Tejhati to reach Kurumgram. There are buses available in every 10 minutes from Tejhati to Rampurhat and Nalhati in common week days.
- Railway Service- The nearest railway station from Kurumgram is Swadinpur-SDLE (9.5 km). The other railway stations nearby are Nalhati Junction-NHT (10 km) and Rampurhat Junction railway station-RPH (14 km). RPH-Rampurhat Junction is one of major Railway stations of Howrah Division of Eastern Railway zone which is connected with Kolkata, South Bengal, South India, some parts of Middle and Western India, North India, North Bengal and the whole North-East India.
- Airports- The nearest domestic airport is Kazi Nazrul Islam Airport in Durgapur (124 km) and the nearest international airport is Netaji Subhas Chandra Bose International Airport in Kolkata.

== Education ==
There are two Bengali-medium Government primary schools (class I-IV) in Kurumgram - Kurumgram Boys' Primary School and Kurumgram Girls' Primary School. There is a private missionary nursery (primary) English medium school- Sree Sree Ramkrishna Sishu Vidyapith. There is a co-educational Government Bengali-medium Higher Secondary School, Mitrabhum High School, the oldest High School in this area, set up in 1921. Students from nearby villages and nearby towns come here to study.

There are no colleges in Kurumgram village. The nearest colleges are Rampurhat College and Hiralal Bhakat College (Nalhati), and Sofia Girls' College.

== See also ==
- Nalhati I
- Rampurhat
