= Jadunath Sinha =

Indian writer

- যদুনাথ সিংহ
- Undated portrait of Jadunath Sinha
- Born: Jadunath Sinha; 1892; Kurumgram, Birbhum, Bengal Presidency, British India (Now West Bengal, India)
- Died: 10 August 1978
- Education: University of Calcutta
- Occupations: Philosopher, writer, religious seeker
- Writing career
- Language: Bengali, English
- Notable works: A manual of ethics, Indian psychology, A history of Indian philosophy, Indian Philosophy
- Notable awards: Philip Samuel Smith Prize, Clint Memorial Prize, Griffith Prize (CU), Mouat Medal

Jadunath Sinha (1892 – 10 August 1978) was an Indian philosopher, writer and religious seeker.

== Early life ==
Jadunath Sinha was born in Kurumgram in Birbhum, West Bengal in 1892. Later he lived in Murshidabad and Kolkata (then Calcutta). Jadunath Sinha came from a Shakta Uttar rarhi kayastha family. So, Sinha had spiritual experiences throughout his life. He followed both classical tantra and emotional Shakta bhakti, with a philosophical position of Shakta universalism.

== Academic career ==
Jadunath Sinha passed B.A., Honours in Philosophy in 1915 from the Calcutta University and simultaneously won the Philip Samuel Smith Prize and the Clint Memorial Prize. Subsequently, he passed the M.A. in Philosophy from the Calcutta University in 1917.

In October 1922, he submitted a thesis on "Indian Psychology and Perception" and went on to win the Premchand Roychand Scholarship; his examiners were Brajendra Nath Seal and Sarvepalli Radhakrishnan. The remaining parts were submitted till completion in 1925, when he was awarded the Mout Medal. This time, Radhakrishnan and Krishna Chandra Bhattacharya served as the readers.

He was then appointed as a faculty member at the Meerut College. Sinha has been cited as one of the early contributors to the field of Indian psychology that began to emerge more strongly in the 21st century.

=== Controversy ===
On 20 December 1928, Sinha sent a letter to the Editor of The Modern Review (TMR) which was reproduced in the January 1929 issue: it was claimed that "numerous passages" of his doctoral thesis were "bodily incorporated" into Radhakrishnan's second volume of Indian Philosophy (published in 1927) and "certain chapters" were summarised in toto but without any attribution. (Note: Radhakrishnan's appointment, as a southerner, to "the most important chair of philosophy in India" in the north, was resented by a number of people from the Bengali intelligentsia and The Modern Review had become the main vehicle of criticism. Radhakrishnan's writings were subject of regular critiques in The Modern Review who alleged that he failed to cite multiple Bengali scholars with seminal contributions.) 40 comparative instances were provided in support; the next issue of TMR, Sinha doubled down on his claims and cited another 70 instances.

Radhakrishnan rejected the "extraordinary allegations", in what was his first publication for TMR, and claimed that partial similarities in translations of classics were unavoidable. He counter-attacked Sinha for passing off Ganganath Jha's translations as his own and emphasised their differential approaches — Sinha's was a literal translation while his was more of an overview commentary. Radhakrishnan raised additional alibis: he had been long lecturing using these notes and his book was ready for publication by 1924, before Sinha's thesis was even complete. (Note: The manuscript was sent in 1924 and General Editor of Radhakrishnan's publisher, Professor Muirhead, confirmed to the Calcutta High Court that the publication got delayed for three years, due to his stay in the United States.) However, Sinha refused to concede and published two detailed rejoinders. Immediately, the editor of TMR — Ramananda Chatterjee — considered the controversy "closed" and refused to entertain any further discussion; he had been long convinced of Sinha's claims. (Note: Chatterjee had earlier refused to publish a letter by Nalini Ganguli confirming that Radhakrishnan had provides the same translations/notes to him in 1922. The latter was then published in the March 1929 edition of The Calcutta Review.)

This led to the dispute escalating into a juristic fight, with Radhakrishnan filing a suit for defamation of character against Sinha and Chatterjee, demanding Rs. 100,000 for the damage done, and Sinha filing a case against Radhakrishnan for copyright infringement, demanding Rs. 20,000. (Note: The timeline is not clear. According to Gopal, Radhakrishnan filed his lawsuit in the summer of 1929, to which Sinha filed a counter-claim. According to Minor as well as Murty & Vohra, Sinha filed a lawsuit first, to which Radhakrishnan responded.) While many scholars veered in support of Radhakrishnan — Jha, Kuppuswami Sastri, and Nalini Ganguli confirmed that Radhakrishnan was distributing the notes in question among his students and colleagues since 1922 and even volunteered to give evidence — Brajendra Seal and a few others requested to be exempted from the purview of the case. Multiple legal stalwarts including Sarat Chandra Bose, Dhirendra Chandra Mitra, and N. N. Sirkar chose to appear for Radhakrishnan pro bono.

The disputed were finally settled by out-of-court mediation at the behest of Syama Prasad Mookerjee and both suits were withdrawn in April 1933; acting Chief Justice Phani Bhushan Chakravarti dismissed the case on 3 May noting a decree of compromise. The terms of the settlement were not disclosed, and all allegations (and counter-allegations) were withdrawn.

== Notable works ==
- Indian Psychology Perception (1934).
- A Manual Of Ethics (1962)
- Indian psychology (1934) ISBN 9788120801653 Publisher: Motilal Banarsidass.
- A History of Indian Philosophy, Volume 1, Sinha Publishing House, 1956.
- History Of Indian Philosophy(1930) vol 2, London Macmillan.
- Outline Of Indian Philosophy, New Central Book Agency, 1998 ISBN 9788173812033.
- The Philosophy of Vijnanabikshu, Sinha Publishing House, 1976.
