= Sagardighi (community development block) =

- Community development block
- Interactive map of Sagardighi
- Coordinates: 24.28°N 88.10°E
- Country: India
- State: West Bengal
- District: Murshidabad

Government
  - Type: Federal democracy
  - MLA: Bayron Biswas

Area
  - Total: 345.20 km^{2} (133.28 sq mi)
- Elevation: 32 m (105 ft)

Population (2011)
  - Total: 310,461
  - Density: 899.37/km^{2} (2,329.3/sq mi)

Languages
  - Official: Bengali, English

Literacy
  - Literacy (2011): 65.27%
- Time zone: UTC+5:30 (IST)
- PIN: 742226 (Sagardighi); 742237 (Kabilpur)
- Telephone/ STD code: 91 3483
- Vehicle registration: WB-57, WB-58
- Lok Sabha constituency: Jangipur
- Vidhan Sabha constituency: Sagardighi
- Website: murshidabad.gov.in

Sagardighi is a community development block that forms an administrative division in the Jangipur subdivision of Murshidabad district in the Indian state of West Bengal.

== History ==
=== Stone Age ===
Small weapons made of stone, which are around 15,000-20,000 years old, have been discovered by archaeologists of the State Archaeology Department at Ekani Chandpara in Sagardighi. Apart from the weapons they also discovered raw materials and scrap, which indicates that the weapons were made at this place itself.

=== Pala period ===
Sagardighi has many remains of the Pala dynasty. There is a lake of the name, which is the largest in the district. It was dug up by Mahipala.

=== Gauda Sultanate ===
Hussain Shah, the greatest of Sultans of Gauda, was associated with Chandpara or Ekani Chandpara in Sagardighi block. Sekherdighi is a large lake excavated by him.

=== British Period ===
During the British Raj, the Murshidabad leadership of the Nawabs became weak and the British gave charge of revenue collections to a few noble Rajput Marwari's. These nobles were given the title of 'Zamindar' (Land owners). The Kothari family reigned over Sagardighi from the time of Mir Qasim until the abolishment of the Zamindari system after the independence of India. The last ruling Zamindar of Sagardighi and the surrounding areas of Ratanpur was Bimal Singh Kothari. His family/descendants continue to live in Calcutta (now Kolkata).

== Geography ==
Sagardighi is located at 24.28°N 88.10°E

Sagardighi CD block lies in the Rarh region in Murshidabad district. The Bhagirathi River splits the district into two natural physiographic regions – Rarh on the west and Bagri on the east. The Rarh region is undulating and contains mostly clay and lateritic clay based soil. As the Rajmahal hills slopes gently down from adjoining Jharkhand it forms the Nabagram plain at the lowest edge of its elevation in this region. The eastern slope of the region is characterised by the existence of numerous cliffs and bluffs.

Sagardighi CD block is bounded by Raghunathganj I and Raghunathganj II CD blocks in the north, Lalgola CD block in the east, Nabagram CD block in the south and Nalhati II CD block, in Birbhum district, in the west.

The Rarh region or the western part of the district is drained by the right bank tributaries of the Bhagirathi, flowing down from the hilly / plateau region of Santhal Pargana division in neighbouring Jharkhand. The Farakka Barrage regulates the flow of water into the Bhagirathi through the feeder canal. Thereafter, it is fed with the discharge from the Mayurakshi system. About 1,800 km^{2} of area in the neighbourhood of Kandi town is flooded by the combined discharge of the Mayurakshi, Dwarka, Brahmani, Gambhira, Kopai and Bakreshwar – the main contributor being the Mayurakshi. Certain other areas in the western sector also get flooded.

Sagardighi CD block has an area of 345.42 km^{2}. It has 1 panchayat samity, 11 gram panchayats, 199 gram sansads (village councils), 197 mouzas and 178 inhabited villages. Sagardighi police station serves this block. Headquarters of this CD block is at Sagardighi.

Rural area under Sagardighi block consists of 11 gram panchayats, viz. Harhari, Balia, Bokhara–I, Kabilpur, Patkeldanga, Bannyeswar, Bokhara–II, Manigram, Sagardighi, Barala, Gobordhandanga and Moregram.

Chandpara and Kherur are villages under Monigram gram panchayat.

Some 2,000 migratory open-bill storks, locally known as shamukkhol (oyster shell), are found settling every year near the marshy lands in the Milki area of Sagardighi.

== Demographics ==
=== Population ===
According to the 2011 Census of India, Sagardighi CD block had a total population of 310,461, all of which were rural. There were 158,641 (51%) males and 151,820 (49%) females. Population in the age range 0-6 years numbered 46,641. Scheduled Castes numbered 58,308 (18.78%) and Scheduled Tribes numbered 19,811 (6.38%).

In 2011 Sagardighi (village) had a population of 1,966.

In 2001, Sagardighi CD block had a population of 252,360 in 2001, out of which 128,596 were males and 123,764 were females. Decadal growth during the period 1991-2001 was 26.76 per cent against decadal growth of 23.70 per cent in Murshidabad District. Decadal growth in 1991-2001 in West Bengal was 17.84 per cent.

The decadal growth of population in Sagardighi CD block in 2001-2011 was 23.06%.

The decadal growth rate of population in Murshidabad district was as follows: 33.5% in 1951–61, 28.6% in 1961–71, 25.5% in 1971–81, 28.2% in 1981-91, 23.8% in 1991-2001 and 21.1% in 2001-11. The decadal growth rate for West Bengal in 2001-11 was 13.93%.

There are reports of Bangladeshi infiltrators entering Murshidabad district.

Decadal Population Growth Rate (%)

- Sagardighi CD block
- Murshidabad district
- West Bengal

=== Villages ===
Large villages in Sagardighi CD block were (2011 population figures in brackets):Ramna Sekhdighi (6,367), Gangadda (4,801), Kismatgadi (4,185), Sahebnagar (9,453), Manigram (4,162), Bokhara (8,000), Jugor (6,080), Popara (10,107), Balia (10,299), Kabilpur (16,489), Charkabilpur (5,438), Char Mathurapur (7,112), Sinheswari Gauripur (4,921), Harhari and Dasturhat (9,959).

=== Literacy ===
As per the 2011 census, the total number of literate persons in Sagardighi CD block was 172,182 (65.26% of the population over 6 years) out of which males numbered 92,101 (68.34% of the male population over 6 years) and females numbered 80,081 (62.05% of the female population over 6 years). The gender disparity (the difference between female and male literacy rates) was 6.29%.

See also – List of West Bengal districts ranked by literacy rate

Literacy in CD blocks of
Murshidabad district
Jangipur subdivision
Farakka – 59.75%
Samserganj – 54.98%
Suti I – 58.40%
Suti II – 55.23%
Raghunathganj I – 64.49%
Raghunathganj II – 61.17%
Sagardighi – 65.27%
Lalbag subdivision
Murshidabad-Jiaganj – 69.14%
Bhagawangola I - 57.22%
Bhagawangola II – 53.48%
Lalgola– 64.32%
Nabagram – 70.83%
Sadar subdivision
Berhampore – 73.51%
Beldanga I – 70.06%
Beldanga II – 67.86%
Hariharpara – 69.20%
Naoda – 66.09%
Kandi subdivision
Kandi – 65.13%
Khargram – 63.56%
Burwan – 68.96%
Bharatpur I – 62.93%
Bharatpur II – 66.07%
Domkol subdivision
Domkal – 55.89%
Raninagar I – 57.81%
Raninagar II – 54.81%
Jalangi – 58.73%
Source: 2011 Census: CD Block Wise
Primary Census Abstract Data

=== Language and religion ===
Religion in Sagardighi CD block (2011)
Islam	64.68%
Hinduism	31.56%
Christianity	1.85%
Sarnaism	1.79%
Other or not stated	0.09%

In the 2011 census, Muslims numbered 200,796 and formed 64.68% of the population in Sagardighi CD block. Hindus numbered 97,968 and formed 31.56% of the population. Others numbered 11,697 and formed 3.76% of the population. In Sagardighi CD Block while the proportion of Muslims increased from 59.75% in 1991 to 62.18% in 2001, the proportion of Hindus declined from 39.18% in 1991 to 35.55% in 2001.

Murshidabad district had 4,707,573 Muslims who formed 66.27% of the population, 2,359,061 Hindus who formed 33.21% of the population, and 37, 173 persons belonging to other religions who formed 0.52% of the population, in the 2011 census. While the proportion of Muslim population in the district increased from 61.40% in 1991 to 63.67% in 2001, the proportion of Hindu population declined from 38.39% in 1991 to 35.92% in 2001.

Languages of Sagardighi CD block (2011)
1. Bengali (93.9%)
2. Santali (5.83%)
3. Others (0.23%)

At the time of the 2011 census, 93.94% of the population spoke Bengali and 5.83% Santali as their first language.

== Rural poverty ==
As per the Human Development Report 2004 for West Bengal, the rural poverty ratio in Murshidabad district was 46.12%. Purulia, Bankura and Birbhum districts had higher rural poverty ratios. These estimates were based on Central Sample data of NSS 55th round 1999-2000.

== Economy ==
=== Livelihood ===
In Sagadighi CD block in 2011, amongst the class of total workers, cultivators numbered 18,108 and formed 16.20%, agricultural labourers numbered 55,413 and formed 49.56%, household industry workers numbered 8,251 and formed 7.38% and other workers numbered 30,036 and formed 26.86%.

=== Infrastructure ===
There are 178 inhabited villages in Sagardighi CD block. 100% villages have power supply. 176 villages (98.88%) have drinking water supply. 32 villages (17.98%) have post offices. 165 villages (92.70%) have telephones (including landlines, public call offices and mobile phones). 39 villages (21.91%) have a pucca approach road and 39 villages (21.91%) have transport communication (includes bus service, rail facility and navigable waterways). 9 villages (5.06%) have agricultural credit societies and 13 villages (7.30%) have banks.

=== Sagardighi Thermal Power Station ===
The Sagardighi Thermal Power Station of West Bengal Power Development Corporation, at Manigram, initially had a capacity of 2 x 300 MW, commissioned in 2008. It was subsequently expanded by 2 x 500 MW. The expansion units were commissioned in 2015 and 2017

=== Agriculture ===
Persons engaged in agriculture
in Sagardighi CD block
1. Bargadars (4.78%)
2. Patta holders (9.48%)
3. Small farmers (6.37%)
4. Marginal farmers (30.4%)
5. Agricultural labourers (49.0%)

From 1977 onwards major land reforms took place in West Bengal. Land in excess of land ceiling was acquired and distributed amongst the peasants. Following land reforms land ownership pattern has undergone transformation. In 2013–14, persons engaged in agriculture in Sagardighi CD block could be classified as follows: bargadars 5,409 (4.78%), patta (document) holders 10,723 (9.48%), small farmers (possessing land between 1 and 2 hectares) 7,201 (6.37%), marginal farmers (possessing land up to 1 hectare) 34,368 (30.38%) and agricultural labourers 55,413 (48.99%).

Sagardighi CD block had 51 fertiliser depots, 2 seed store and 67 fair price shops in 2013-14.

In 2013–14, Sagardighi CD block produced 118,356 tonnes of Aman paddy, the main winter crop from 35,781 hectares, 36,483 tonnes of Boro paddy (spring crop) from 10,278 hectares, 23,717 tonnes of wheat from 7,927 hectares, 17,102 tonnes of jute from 1,021 hectares and 11,555 tonnes of potatoes from 394 hectares. It also produced pulses and oilseeds.

In 2013–14, the total area irrigated in Sagardighi CD block was 8,686 hectares, out of which 4,222 hectares were irrigated by canal water, 750 hectares with tank water, 118 hectares with river lift irrigation, 1,096 hectares by deep tube well and 2,500 hectares by other means.

=== Silk and handicrafts ===
Murshidabad is famous for its silk industry since the Middle Ages. There are three distinct categories in this industry, namely (i) Mulberry cultivation and silkworm rearing (ii) Peeling of raw silk (iii) Weaving of silk fabrics.

Ivory carving is an important cottage industry from the era of the Nawabs. The main areas where this industry has flourished are Khagra and Jiaganj. 99% of ivory craft production is exported. In more recent years sandalwood etching has become more popular than ivory carving. Bell metal and Brass utensils are manufactured in large quantities at Khagra, Berhampore, Kandi and Jangipur. Beedi making has flourished in the Jangipur subdivision.

=== Banking ===
In 2013–14, Sagardighi CD block had offices of 10 commercial banks and 3 gramin banks.

=== Backward Regions Grant Fund ===
Murshidabad district is listed as a backward region and receives financial support from the Backward Regions Grant Fund. The fund, created by the Government of India, is designed to redress regional imbalances in development. As of 2012, 272 districts across the country were listed under this scheme. The list includes 11 districts of West Bengal.

== Transport ==
Sagardighi CD block has 2 ferry services and 5 originating/ terminating bus routes.

The Barharwa-Azimganj-Katwa loop line passes through this block and there are stations at Manigram, Noapara Mahisa, Mahipal and Mahipal Road.

The Nalhati-Azimganj branch line passes through this block and there are stations at Morgram, Sagardighi and Barla.

National Highway 12 (old number NH 34) passes through this block.

National Highway 14/ Panagarh-Morgram Highway originates/ terminates from/ at Morgram in this CD block.

== Education ==
In 2013–14, Sagardighi CD block had 156 primary schools with 20,710 students, 20 middle schools with 2,485 students, 9 high schools with 6,328 students and 16 higher secondary schools with 28,135 students. Sagardighi CD block had 1 general college with 1,730 students, 1 technical/ professional institution with 100 students, 453 institutions for special and non-formal education with 28,283 students.

Sagardighi Kamada Kinkar Smriti Mahavidyalaya was established in 2008 at Sagardighi. It offers honours courses in Bengali, English, Sanskrit, Arabic, history, geography, political science, philosophy and education.

Sagardighi Teachers’ Training College was established at Manigram in 2009. Affiliated with the University of Kalyani, it offers B Ed and D El Ed courses.

Sagardighi I.T.I College was established in 2016 at Sagardighi. It's offers courses in Electrician, Fitter-1, Fitter-2Draftsman Civil, Draftsman Mechanical, Surveyor, Sewing Technology , Plumber, Welder.

In Sagardighi CD block, amongst the 178 inhabited villages (highest amongst all CD Blocks in the district), 25 villages did not have a school (second highest amongst all CD blocks in the district), 49 villages have more than 1 primary school, 60 villages have at least 1 primary and 1 middle school and 28 villages had at least 1 middle and 1 secondary school.

== Culture ==
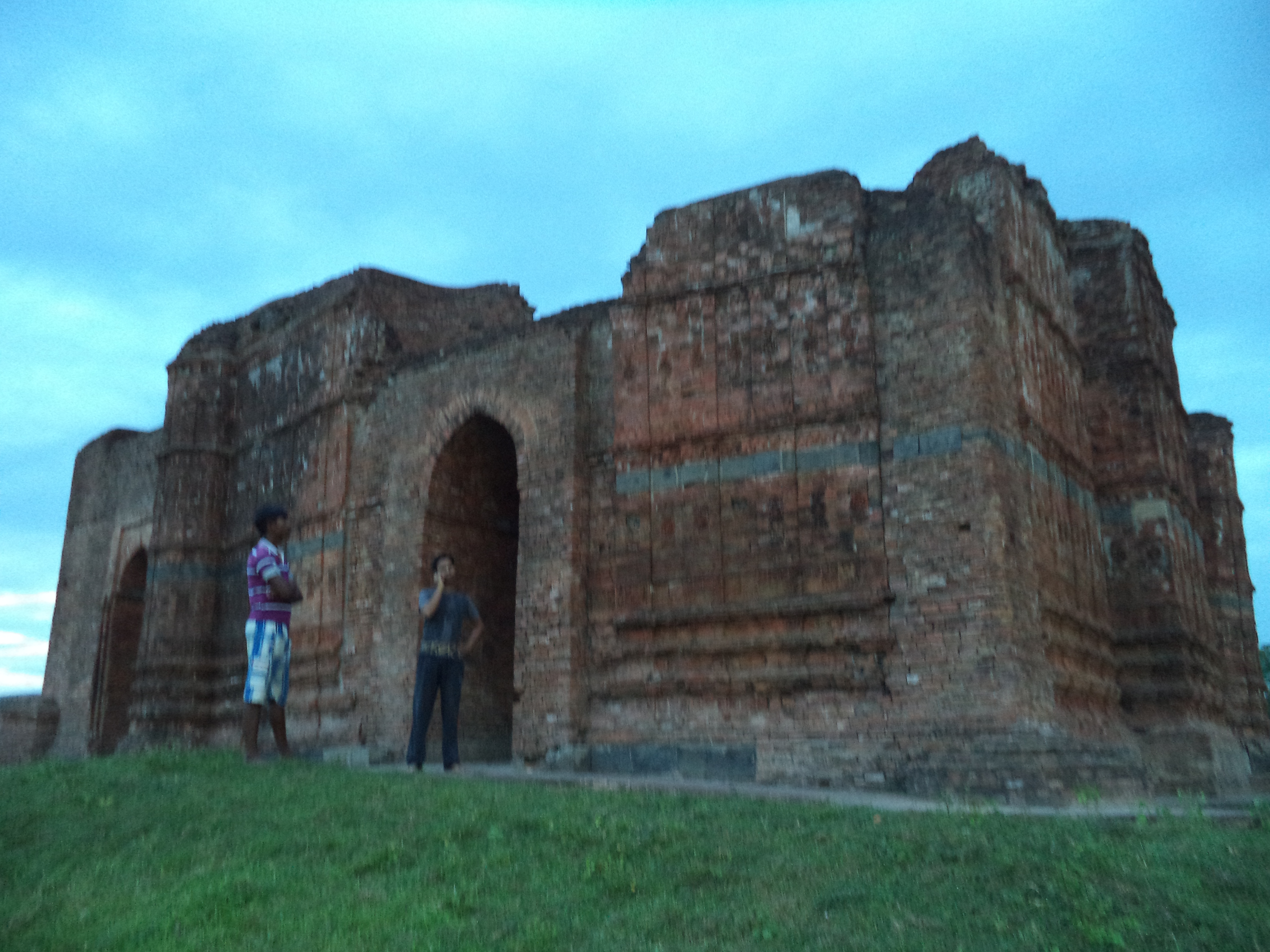
Kherur Mosque

=== Kherur Mosque ===
Kherur Mosque is located on the top of a mound at Kherur in Sagardighi. The 15th century mosque, spread over an area of 2 acres (0.81 ha), was built by Rafat Khan during the reign of Sultan Hussain Shah. The mosque is rectangular in shape. There is a domed prayer chamber. The mosque has four minarets at four corners.

=== Chandanbati temple ===
Chandanbati temple is a major tourist attraction.

== Healthcare ==
In 2014, Sagardighi CD block had 1 rural hospital and 3 primary health centre with total 50 beds and 7 doctors (excluding private bodies). It had 38 family welfare subcentres. 10,817 patients were treated indoor and 201,071 patients were treated outdoor in the hospitals, health centres and subcentres of the CD Block.

Sagardighi CD block has Sagardighi Super Speciality Hospital at Sagardighi (with 120 beds), Monigram Primary Health Centre (with 20 beds), Singeswari-Gouripur PHC (with 10 beds) and Suryapur PHC at Dhanparganj (with 10 beds).

Sagardighi CD block is one of the areas of Murshidabad district where ground water is affected by a high level of arsenic contamination. The WHO guideline for arsenic in drinking water is 10 mg/ litre, and the Indian Standard value is 50 mg/ litre. All but one of the 26 blocks of Murshidabad district have arsenic contamination above the WHO level, all but two of the blocks have arsenic concentration above the Indian Standard value and 17 blocks have arsenic concentration above 300 mg/litre. The maximum concentration in Sagardighi CD Block is 560 mg/litre.
