= Avijit Das =

Indian dancer

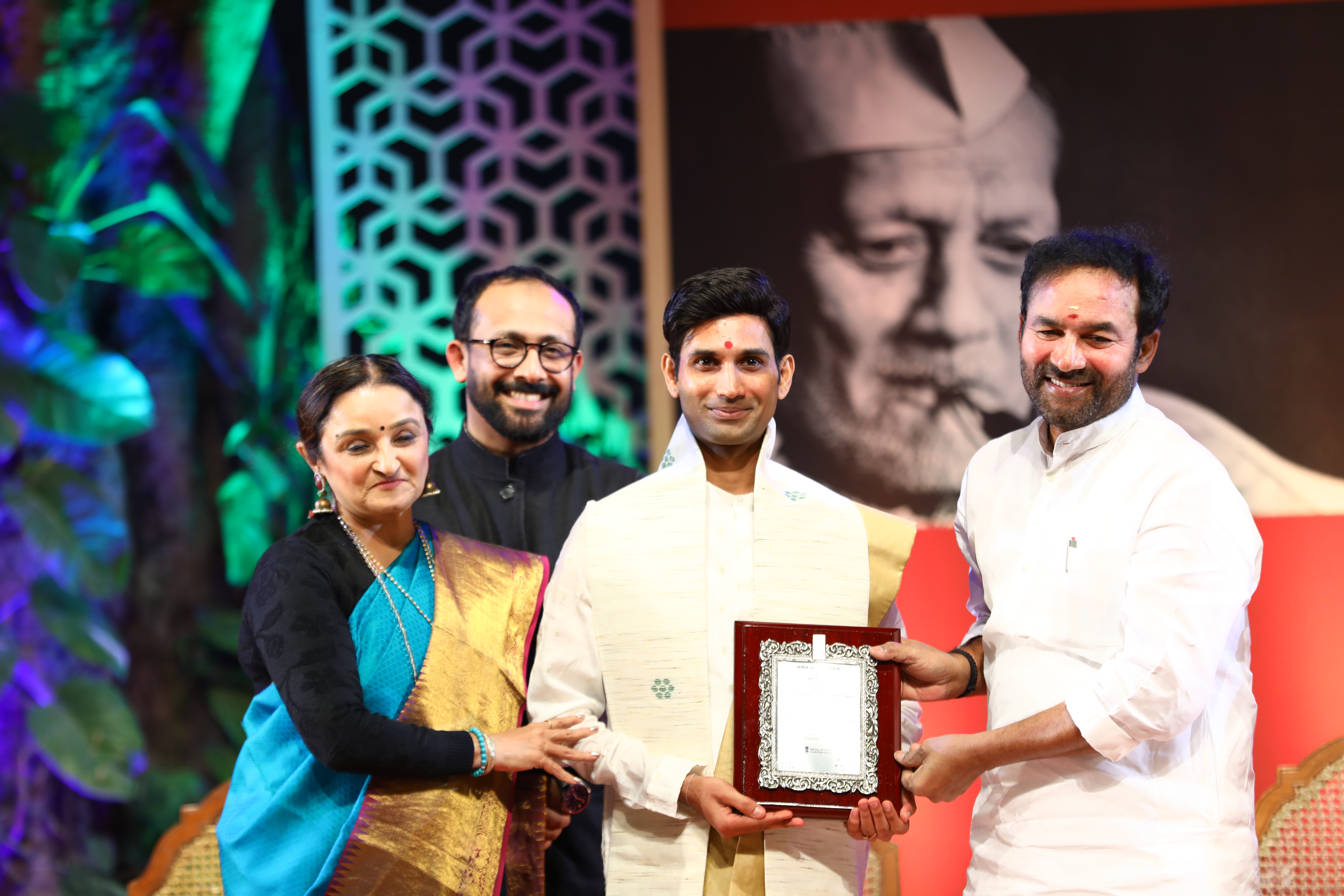
- Receiving Ustad Bismillah Khan Yuva Puraskar from Hon. G. Kishan Reddy, New Delhi
- Born: Avijit Das; 28 February 1986 (age 40); Nalhati, West Bengal, India
- Education: Visva-Bharati University; Kalakshetra Foundation; Kuchipudi Art Academy; Jain University
- Years active: 1995-present
- Known for: Indian Classical Dance
- Movement: Kuchipudi
- Awards: Ustad Bismillah Khan Yuva Puraskar; Guru kelucharan Mohapatra Yuva Prativa Samman; Outstanding Dancer Award By The Madras Music Academy
- Website: kimaham.com

Avijit Das is an Indian Kuchipudi performer, teacher, choreographer, and vocalist. He is a recipient of the Ustad Bismillah Khan Yuva Puraskar for 2021.

== Career ==
Avijit made his debut performance at the age of nine and has been performing extensively both in India and abroad. He has performed at various national dance festivals including the Khajuraho Dance Festival, Bhramara Festival of Dance, Indian Habitat Center and Natyanjali Dance Festival. Avijit has performed at international dance festivals, including Erasing Boarders Dance Festival organized by the Indo-American Arts Council, and Drive East Dance Festival.

== Kim Aham ==
Avijit founded Kim Aham School of Indian Classical Dance in Bengaluru, a UNESCO recognized institution for training classical dancers in Kuchipudi and Bharathanatyam repertoires. Kim Aham conducted several workshops in collaboration with SPIC MACAY and masterclasses in various countries. Kim Aham organized a fundraising event during the COVID-19 pandemic.

== Dance festivals ==
Saranaagathi is an annual dance festival organized by Kim Aham which brings together artists and scholars.

Kavipranam is an annual dance festival organized by Kim Aham to commemorate the legacy of the great poets of the past and celebrate their poetic and musical works by paying tribute through dance choreographies and seminars by scholars in the field.

== Awards and achievements ==
- Ustad Bismillah Khan Yuva Puraskar for 2021 by the Kendra Sangeet Natak Akademi, Govt. of India
