= Nalhati =

- Town
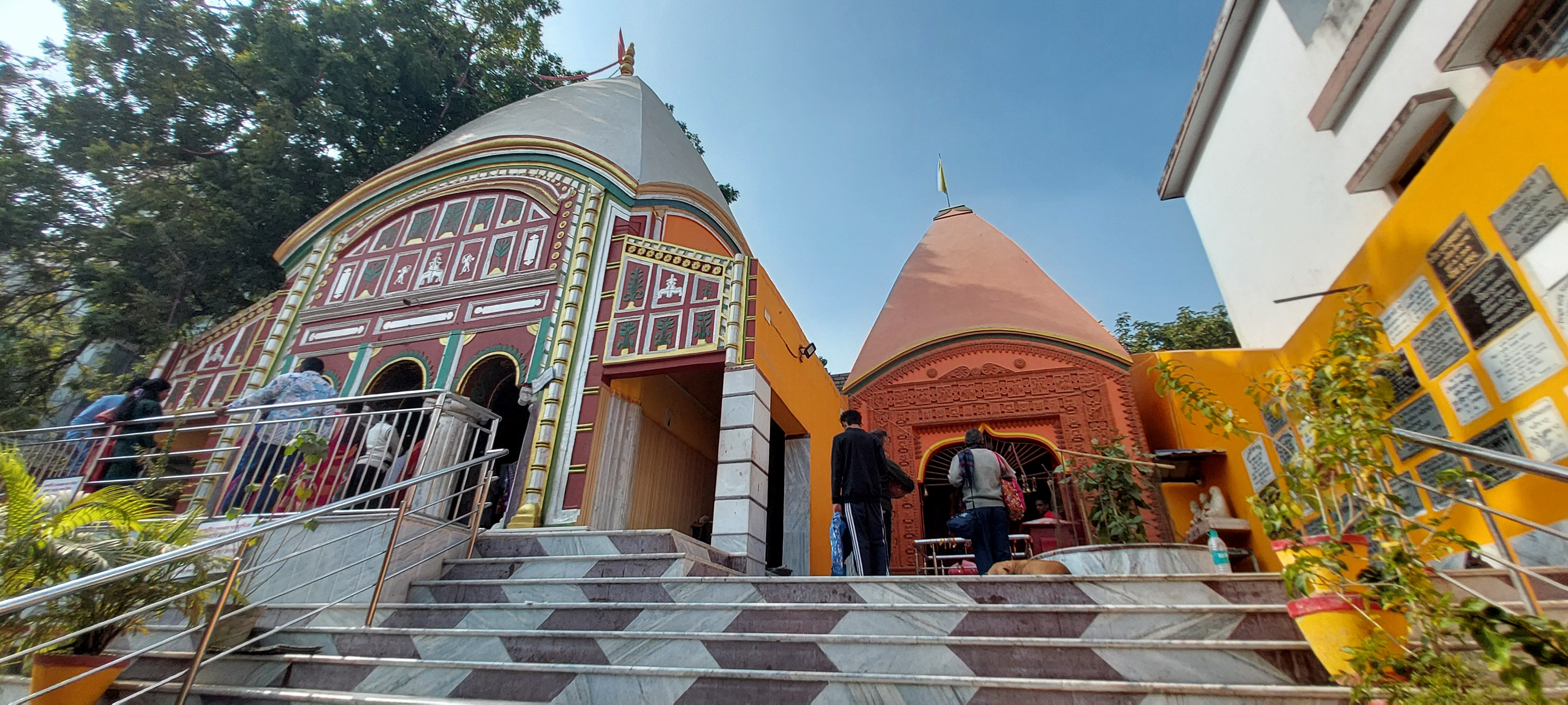
- Nalateswari Temple at Nalhati
- Nickname: Nalhati
- Location in West Bengal, India Nalhati (India)
- Coordinates: 24.294°N 87.839°E
- Country: India
- State: West Bengal
- District: Birbhum
- Named for: Nalateshwari Mata

Government
  - Type: Municipality
  - Body: Nalhati Municipality

Area
  - Total: 7.85 km^{2} (3.03 sq mi)
- Elevation: 48 m (157 ft)

Population (2011)
  - Total: 41,534
  - Density: 5,290/km^{2} (13,700/sq mi)

Languages
  - Official: Bengali, English
- Time zone: UTC+5:30 (IST)
- PIN: 731220 (Nalhati) 731243 (Nalhati TS)
- Telephone/STD code: 03465
- ISO 3166 code: IN-WB
- Lok Sabha constituency: Birbhum
- Vidhan Sabha constituency: Nalhati
- Website: birbhum.nic.in

Nalhati is a small town in Rampurhat subdivision of Birbhum District in the Indian state of West Bengal near the West Bengal / Jharkhand border. This town is named after the Shakta pitha Nalhateshwari temple, which according to the mythologies is situated where the "nala" i.e. throat of goddess Shakti had fallen. It is one of the 51 Shakta pithas in India. Nalhati Municipality was established in 2000.

== Geography ==
Cities and towns in Rampurhat subdivision of Birbhum district
M: municipal city/ town, CT: census town, R: rural/ urban centre.
Owing to space constraints in the small map, the actual locations in a larger map may vary slightly

=== Location ===
Nalhati is located at 24.3°N 87.82°E. It has an average elevation of 48 metres (160 feet). It is on the Chhotonagpur plateau. A small portion of hill with very low altitude can be visible within the town. On the hill the Nalateswari temple and Ana Shahid Baba Majar are two tourist interests. The soil of this part of Birbhum resembles that of Bankura and Purulia as "Lalmatir Desh" (land of red soil).

=== Police station ===
Nalhati police station has jurisdiction over Nalhati I and Nalhati II CD blocks.

=== CD block HQ ===
The headquarters of Nalhati I CD block are located at Nalhati.

=== Overview ===
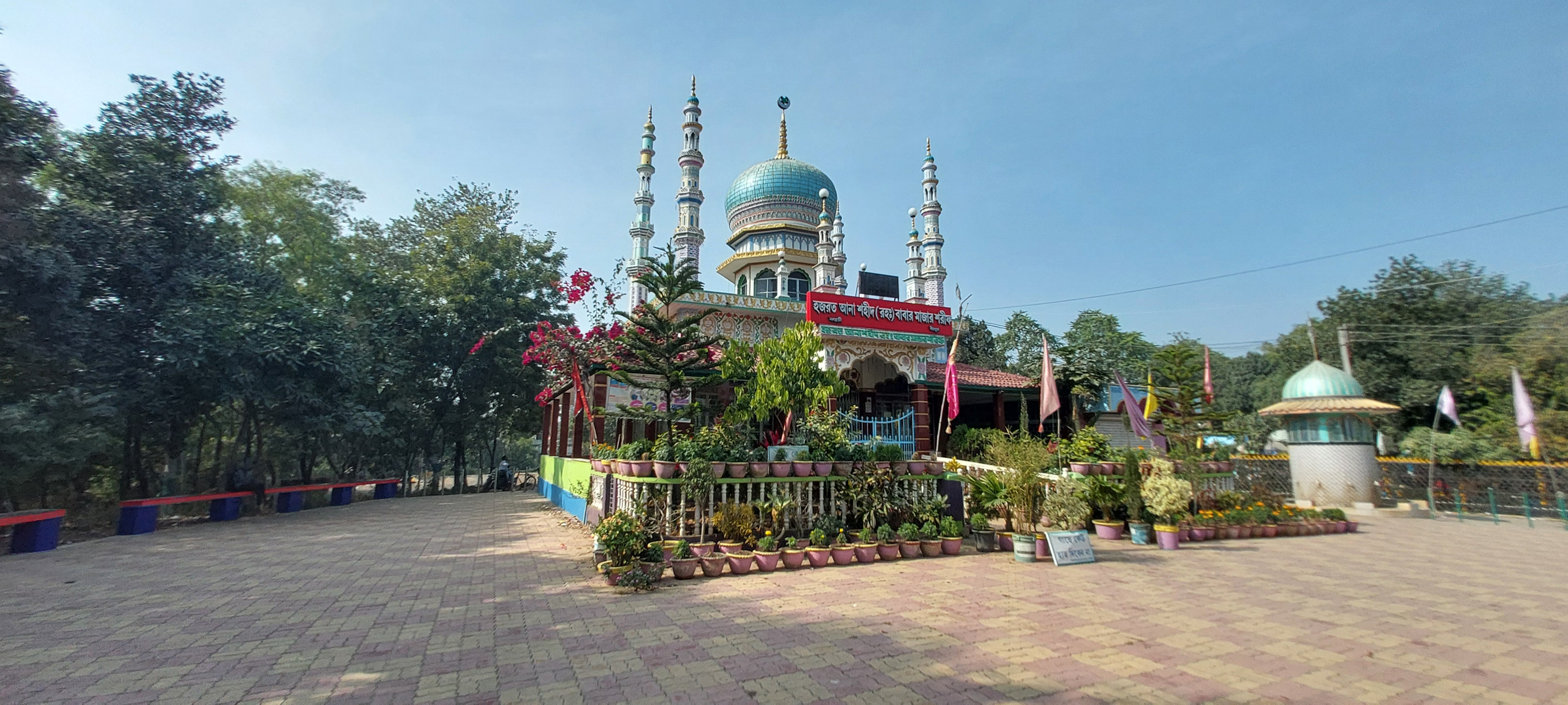
Aana Sahid Baba Majar

The northern portion of Rampurhat subdivision (shown in the map alongside) is part of the Nalhati Plains, a sub-micro physiographic region, and the southern portion is part of the Brahmani-Mayurakshi Basin, another sub-micro physiographic region occupying the area between the Brahmani in the north and the Mayurakshi in the south. There is an occasional intrusion of Rajmahal Hills, from adjoining Santhal Parganas, towards the north-western part of the subdivision. On the western side is Santhal Parganas and the border between West Bengal and Jharkhand can be seen in the map. Murshidabad district is on the eastern side. A small portion of the Padma River and the border with Bangladesh (thick line) can be seen in the north-eastern corner of the map. 96.62% of the population of Rampurhat subdivision live the rural areas and 3.38% of the population live in the urban areas.

Note: The map alongside presents some of the notable locations in the area. All places marked in the map are linked in the larger full screen map.

== Transport ==
Nalhati Junction railway station is on the Khana-Barharwa section of Sahibganj loop. Nalhati-Azimganj branch line originates from Nalhati.

SH 7, running from Rajgram to Midnapore, and NH 14, running from Morgram to Kharagpur, pass through Nalhati. The section of the highway passing through the area was earlier part of Panagarh-Morgram Highway.

== Post Office ==
Nalhati has a delivery sub post office (MAIN), with PIN 731220, under Rampurhat head office.

== Head Office ==
Nalhati has also Kolkata FF Head Office , where people from different parts of the region come to get information and related assistance.

== Notable people ==
- Avijit Das (born 1986), Kuchipudi performer, teacher, choreographer, and vocalist
