= Jadunath Supakar =

Indian artist and textile designer (born 1931)

- Born: 10 February 1931; Sambalpur, Odisha, India
- Occupations: Artist; Textile designer
- Children: Mukta Panda, Prakash Chandra Supakar, Puspa Panda, Snigdha Dash, Bibhas Chandra Supakar, Sribhash Chandra Supakar
- Awards: Padma Shri; Odisha Lalit Kala Academy Award

Jadunath Supakar (born 10 February 1931, date of death unknown) was an Indian artist and textile designer. He was born on 10 February 1931 in Sambalpur in the Indian state of Odisha and was known for his contributions for the popularization of handloom industry of Varanasi. He was a recipient of the Odisha Lalit Kala Academy Award and his creations have been exhibited in several countries. The Government of India awarded him the fourth highest Indian civilian honour, the Padma Shri, in 1985. His son, Sribhash Chandra Supakar, is also a textile designer and a national award winner. Supakar is deceased.
