= Howrah railway division =

Railway division in West Bengal, India

Overview
- Owner: Eastern Railway
- Locale: Howrah, West Bengal, India
- Stations: 193

Service
- Type: Railway division
- System: Indian Railways

History
- Opened: 1925

Technical
- Line length: 400 km (249 mi)

The Howrah railway division is the oldest operational railway division under the Eastern Railway zone of Indian Railways. Serving as a major rail hub for Eastern India, its headquarters are based in Howrah, West Bengal. Established in 1925, the division marked its centenary in 2025. Its network spans over 400 km (249 mi)—extending into parts of Bihar and Jharkhand—and encompasses nearly 200 stations ranging from major terminals to rural halts.

Asansol railway division, Sealdah railway division, and Malda railway division are the other three railway divisions under the Eastern Railway zone, which is headquartered in Kolkata.

== List of busiest non-suburban railway stations ==
This list includes the top 11 busiest NSG (Non-Suburban Group) category railway stations in the Howrah division as of 2022–23.

Category of station	Rank	Name of station
NSG-1	1	Howrah Junction
NSG-2	2	Barddhaman Junction
NSG-3	3	Rampurhat Junction
NSG-3	4	Bandel Junction
NSG-4	5	Bolpur Shantiniketan
NSG-5	6	Pakur
NSG-5	7	Nabadwip Dham
NSG-5	8	Sainthia Junction
NSG-5	9	Khagraghat Road
NSG-5	10	Salar
NSG-5	11	Azimganj Junction

== List of railway stations and towns ==
This table categorizes the railway stations under the Howrah railway division.

Category of station	No. of stations	Names of stations
NSG-1	1	Howrah Junction
NSG-2	1	Barddhaman Junction
NSG-3	2	Rampurhat and Bandel
NSG-4	1	Bolpur Shantiniketan
NSG-5	14	Sainthia Junction, Pakur, Khagraghat Road, Azimganj Junction, Nalhati Junction, Nabadwip Dham, Murarai, Salar, Guskara, Ahmadpur Junction, Morgram, Sagardighi, Rajgram, Mallarpur, Bazarsau
NSG-6	36	Azimganj City, Barala, Bhedia etc.
SG-2	4	Shrirampur, Rishra, Konnagar, Sheoraphuli, Uttarpara
SG-3	87	Katwa Junction, Agradwip, Ambika Kalna, Adisaptagram etc.
HG-1	5	Vishnupriya Halt, Malia, Mertala Phaleya, Rajchandrapur, Dhaniakhali
HG-2	6	Amarun, Shiblun, Miangram, Nimo, Talpur, Tokipur
HG-3	33	Adalpahari, Ambalgram, Barmasia
Total	193	-

== First train in Eastern India ==
On 15 August 1854, the first passenger train in Eastern India made its inaugural commercial run from Howrah to Hooghly, covering a distance of 24 mi (39 km). Operated by the East Indian Railway Company, the journey took approximately 91 minutes, with over 3,000 people applying to travel on the inaugural run. The train consisted of three first-class coaches, two second-class coaches, and three third-class carriages built locally in India after the original coaches shipped from England sank at sea. The locomotive arrived following a delay caused by a navigational error that initially routed the vessel to Australia.
