= Nalhati Junction railway station =

Railway Station in West Bengal, India

NALHATI JUNCTION
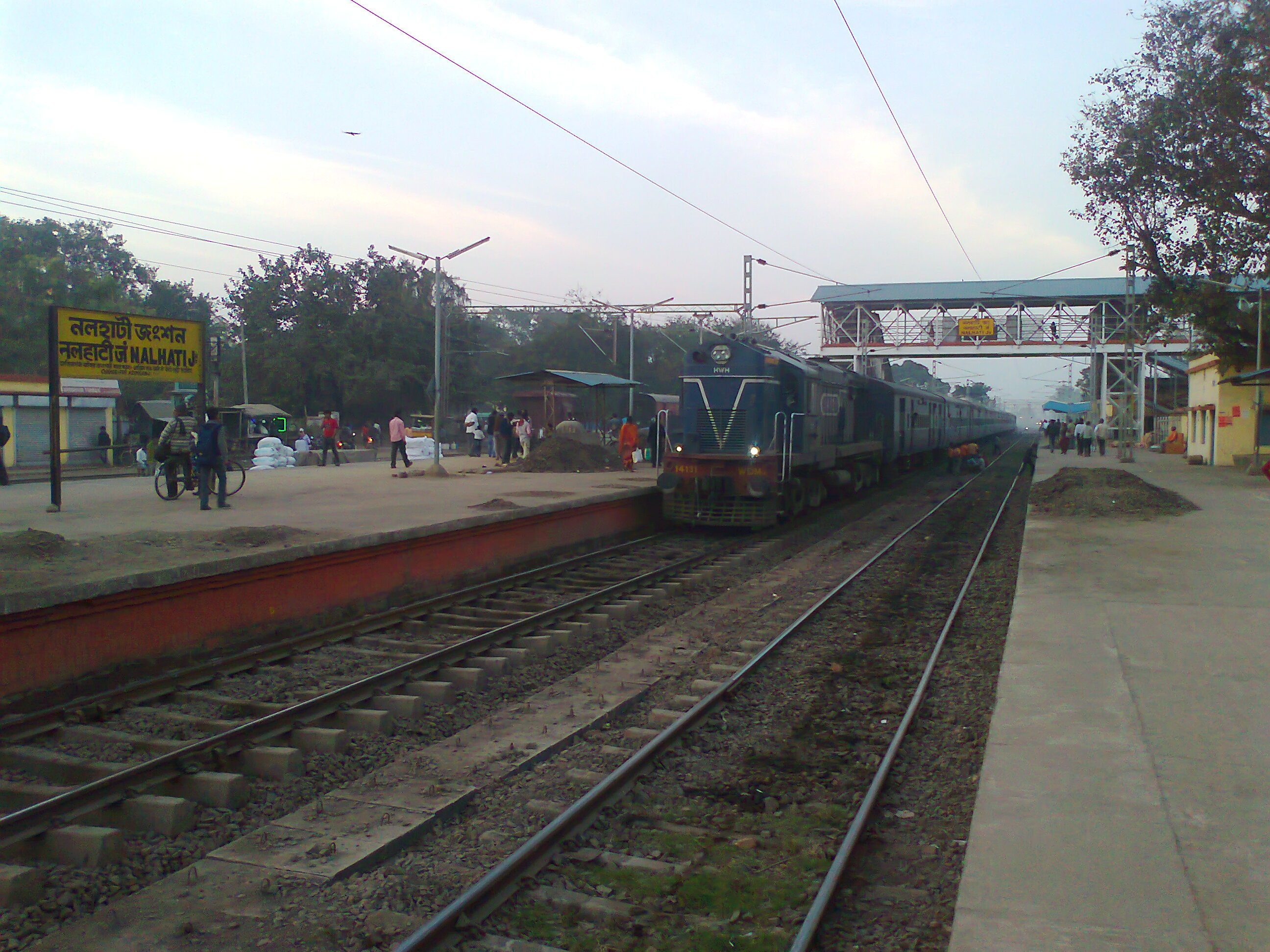

General information
- Location: Nalhati, Birbhum district, West Bengal; India
- Coordinates: 24.2958°N 87.8388°E
- Elevation: 48 metres (157 ft)
- System: Indian Railways junction station
- Owner: Indian Railways
- Operator: Eastern Railway
- Lines: Rampurhat-Malda Town Section; Nalhati–Azimganj branch line
- Platforms: 5
- Tracks: 8

Construction
- Structure type: At grade
- Parking: No parking

Other information
- Status: Active
- Station code: NHT
- Zone(s): Eastern Railway
- Division(s): Howrah
- Classification: NSG-5

History
- Opened: 1863
- Electrified: Electrified 28 January 2017

Services
Preceding station	Indian Railways	Following station
Swadinpur towards Khana	Eastern Railway zone Sahibganj loop	Chatra towards Kiul Junction
Terminus	Eastern Railway zone Nalhati-Azimganj branch line	Takipur towards Azimganj Junction
Location
- Location within West Bengal Location within India

Nalhati Junction is a junction station in the Eastern Railways zone, in the Rampurhat-Malda Town section in Nalhati, West Bengal. The station code is NHT.

This station is categorized as NSG-5 and operates within the Howrah Division in Eastern Railway. It has five platforms.

== Revenue ==
Revenue Details of Nalhati Junction railway station
Financial Year	Category	Revenue (INR)	Approximate Value
2024–25	Reservation Tickets – PRS	₹16,167,190	Nearly ₹1.62 crore
2024–25	Unreserved Tickets – UTS	₹32,490,600	Nearly ₹3.25 crore
2024–25	Total (PRS + UTS)	₹48,657,790	Nearly ₹4.87 crore
2023–24	Total (PRS + UTS)	₹40,735,989	Nearly ₹4.07 crore

== History ==
The Nalhati Junction station building was built in 1892 as a part of private railway line (Nalhati–Azimganj). The structure of the station was made of bricks and mortar and its roof was made of wooden beams, purlins and tiles, which have been damaged.

== List of Trains that Not Restored Yet ==
- 13119/20 Sealdah - Anvt Upper India Express (2 Days a week)
- 13133/34 Sealdah - Varanasi Upper India Express (5 Days a week)
- 53043/44 Howrah - Rajgir Fast Passenger (Daily)
- 53417/18 Bardhaman - Malda Town Passenger (Daily)
- 53137/18 Rampurhat - Barharwa Passenger (Daily)

== Gallery ==
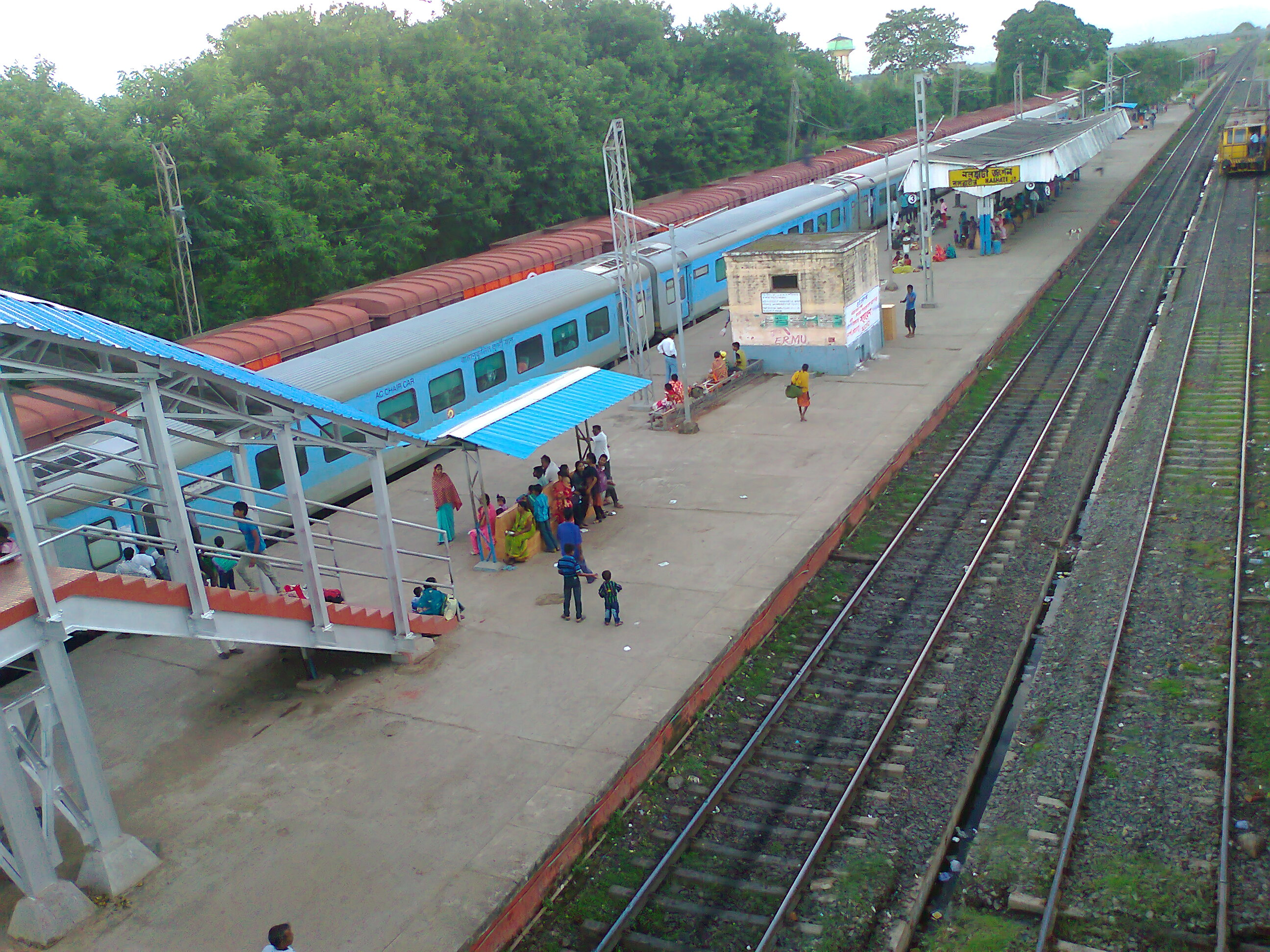
Afternoon shot from newly built foot overbridge when 12041 Up Shatabdi Express was stopped due to signal

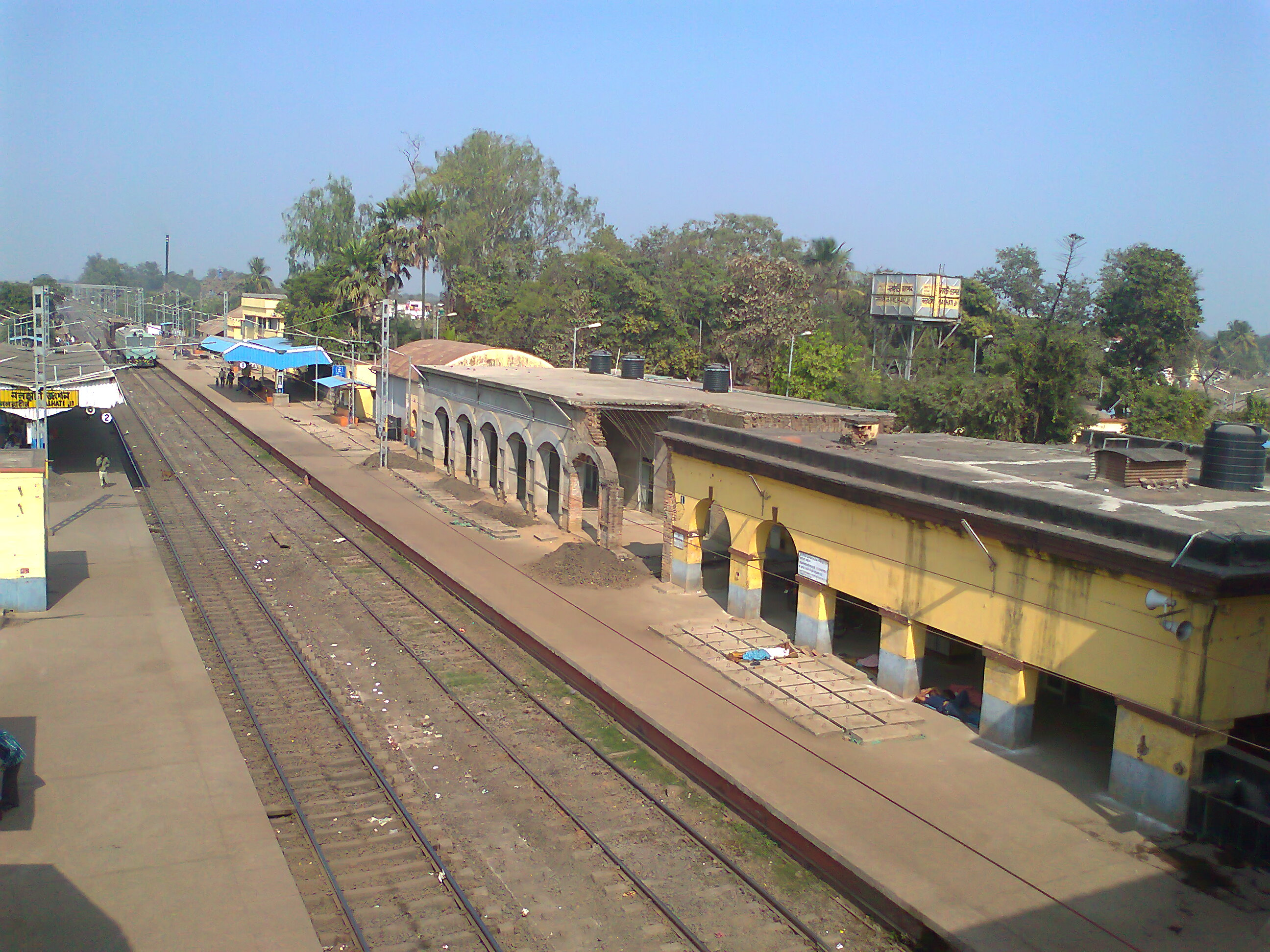
Day shot at Nalhati

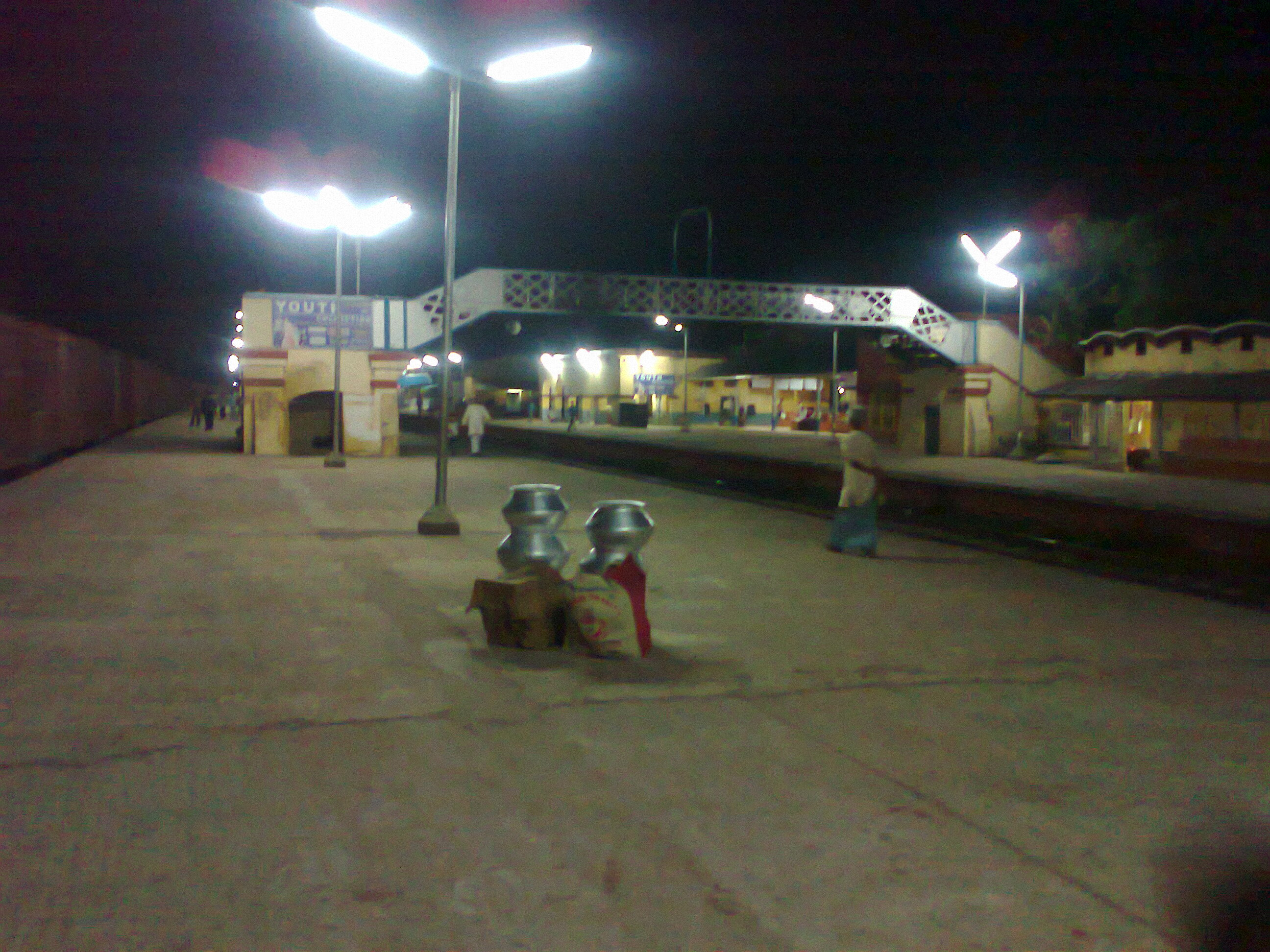
Old foot overbridge at Nalhati

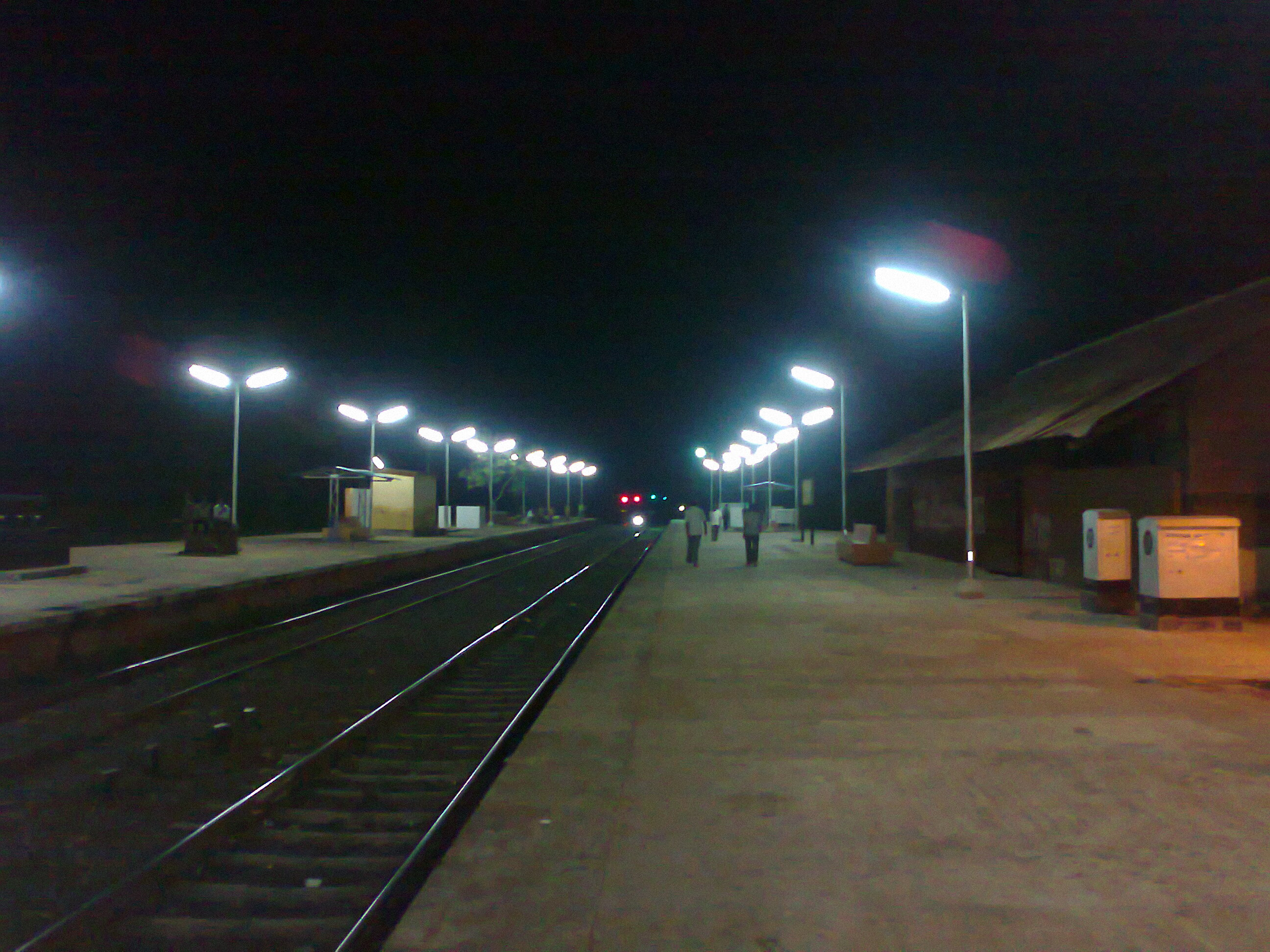
Evening shot at Nalhati

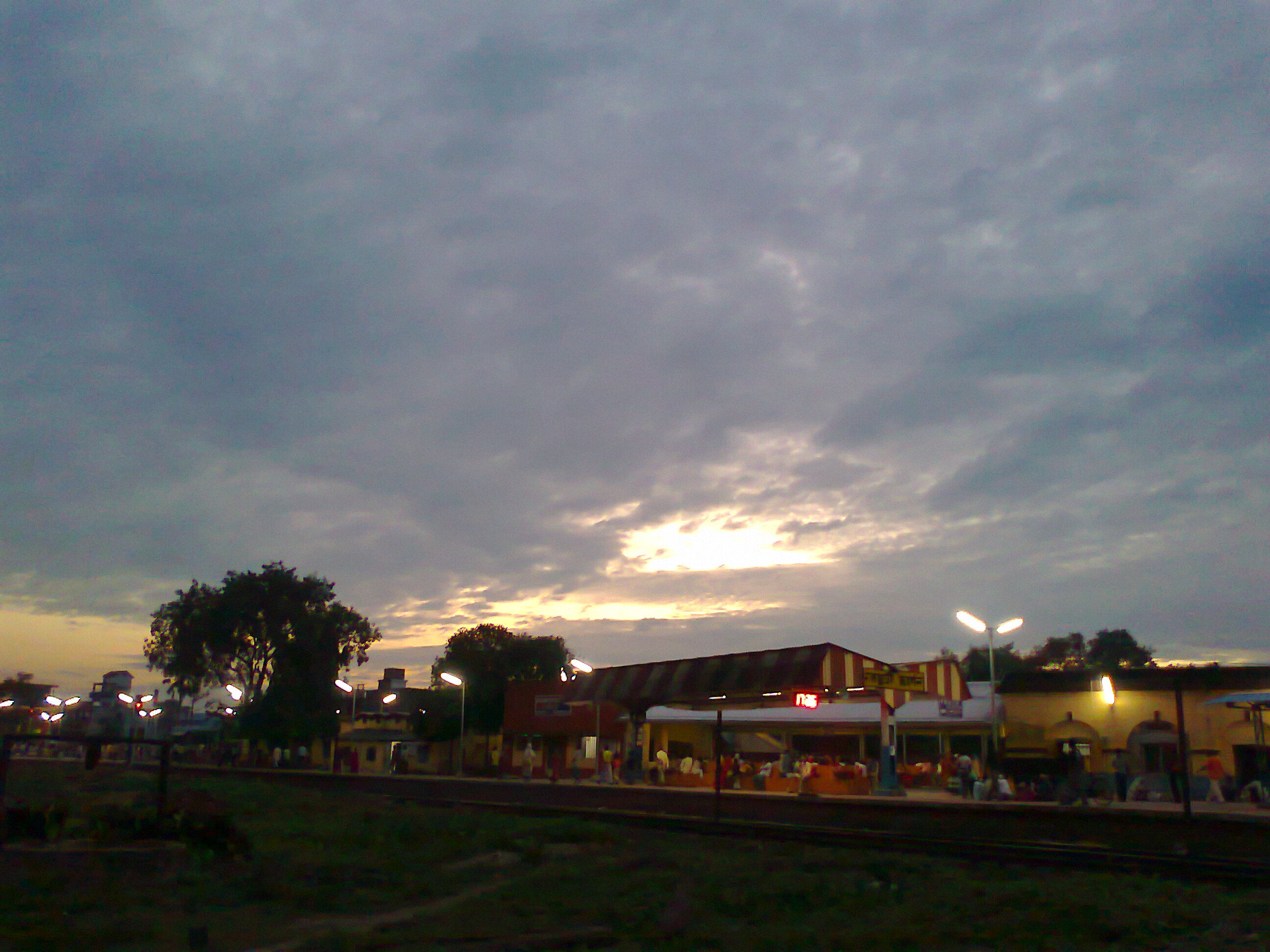
Afternoon shot at Nalhati

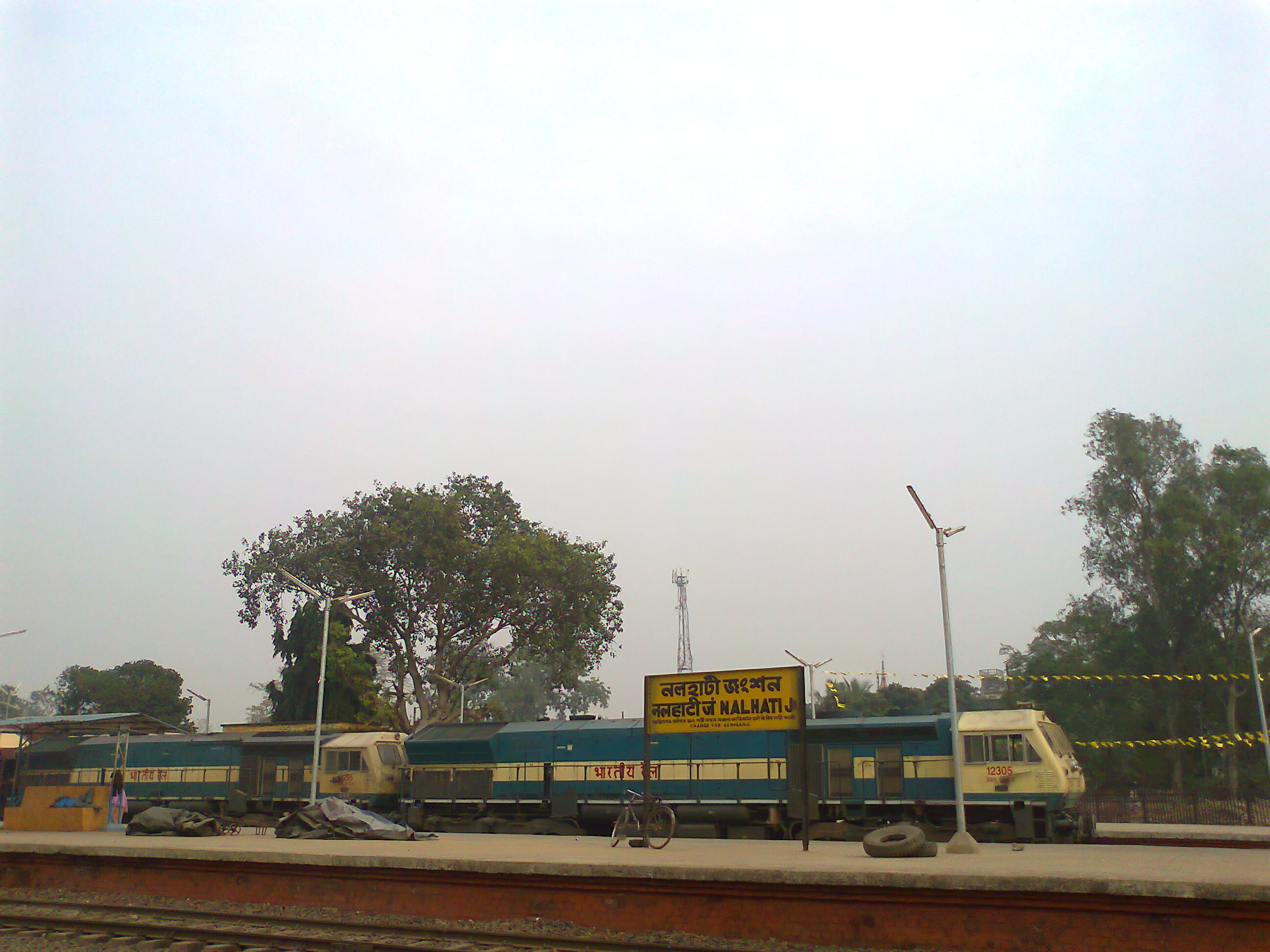
Shot of twin WDG4 at Nalhati

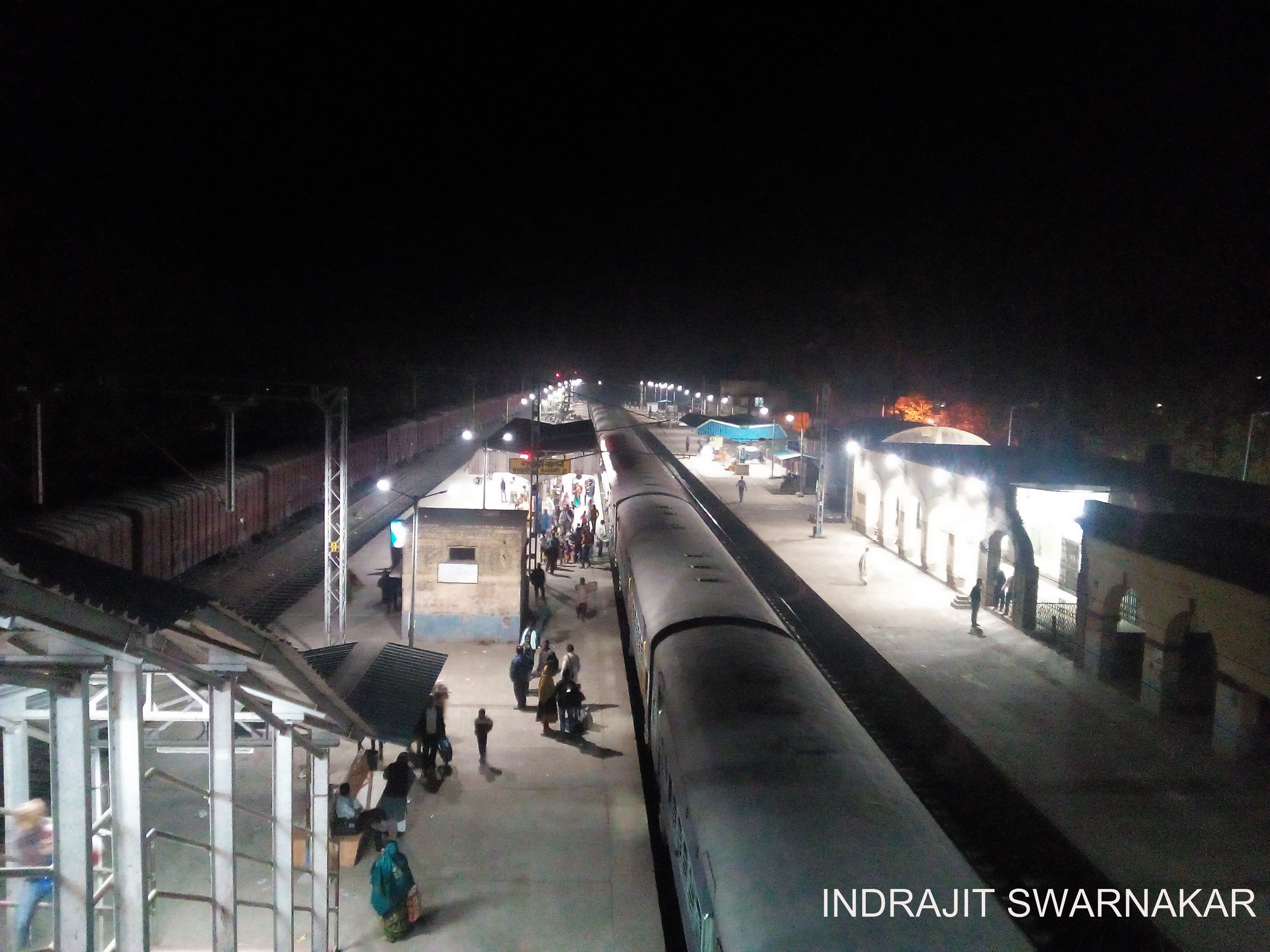
Clicked from FOB

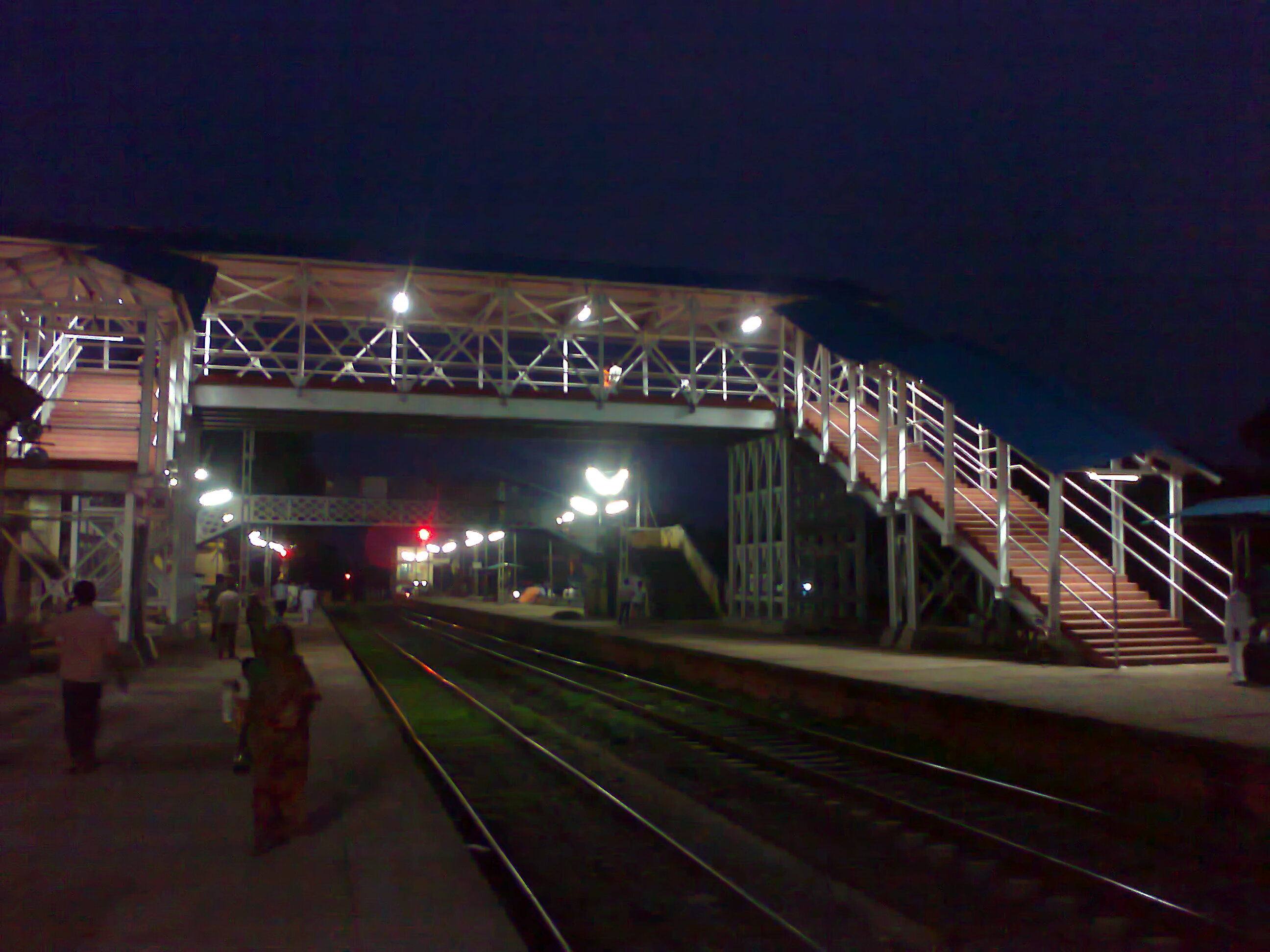
New foot overbridge

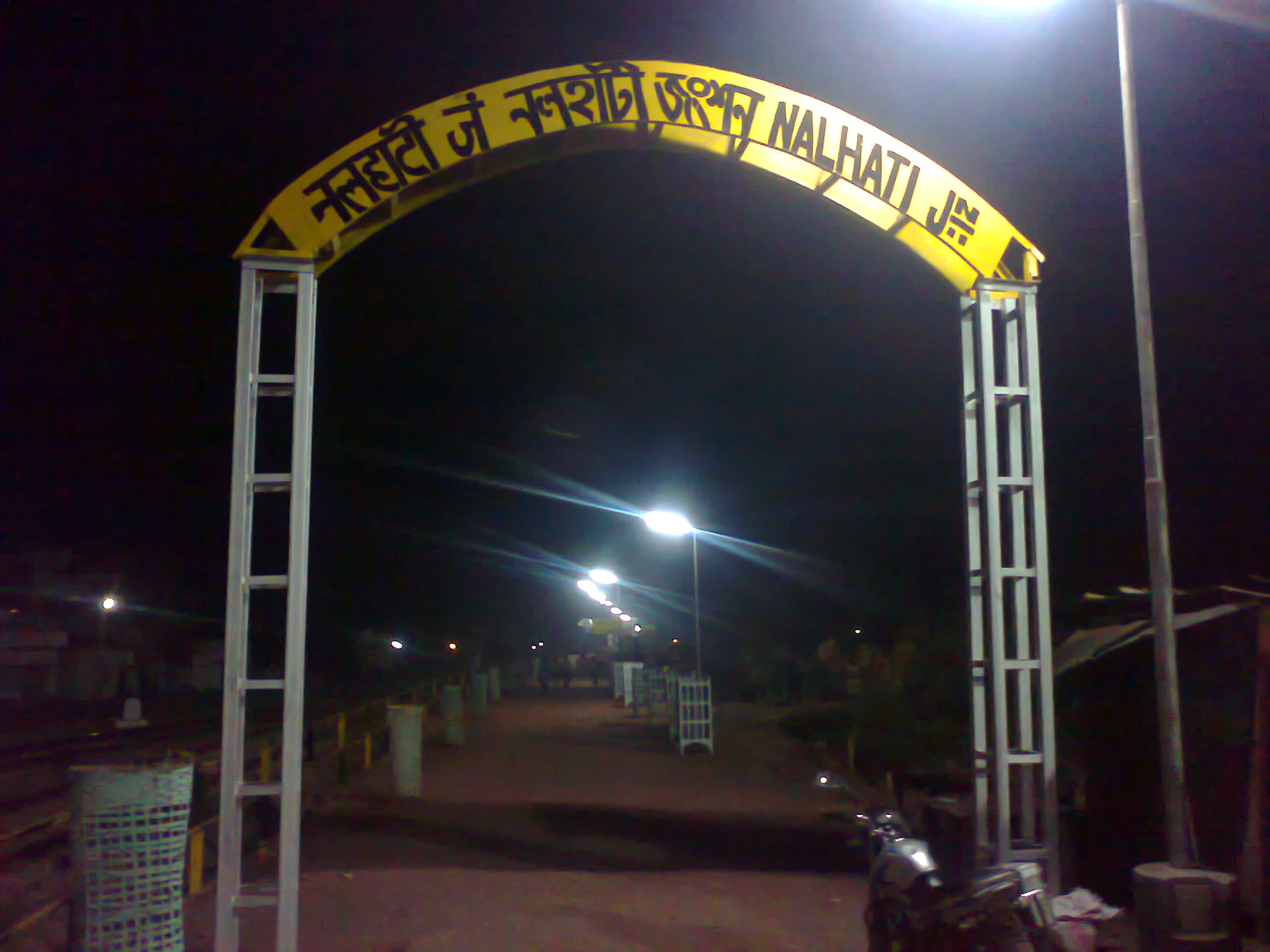
Nalhati Jn branch platform 1B entrance

Nalhati Junction
Next station west: Chatra	Indian Railways : Sahibganj loop			Next station east: Swadinpur
Next station west: Chatra	Stop no.	km from start	Platforms 5	Next station east: Swadinpur

== See also ==
- Azimganj Junction railway station
- Murarai railway station
- Rampurhat Junction railway station
- List of railway stations in India
