= Nalhati–Azimganj branch line =

Overview
- Status: Operational
- Owner: Indian Railways
- Locale: West Bengal
- Termini: Nalhati Railway Station; Azimganj Junction railway station
- Stations: 9

Service
- System: Broad gauge
- Operator(s): Eastern Railway

History
- Opened: 1863
- Electrification: 1 November 2018

Technical
- Line length: 45 km (28 mi)
- Track gauge: 5 ft 6 in (1,676 mm) broad gauge
- Operating speed: 80 km/h (50 mph)

Nalhati–Azimganj branch line is a railway line connecting Nalhati Junction and Azimganj Junction.

== History ==
In 1863, the Indian Branch Railway Company, a private company opened the Nalhati–Azimganj branch line. The 27 kilometres (17 mi) track was initially a 4' gauge line. The track was subsequently converted to 5' 6" broad gauge. The Indian Branch Railway Company was purchased by the Government of India in 1872 and the line was renamed Nalhati State Railway. It became a part of the East Indian Railway Company in 1892.

== Doubling and Electrification ==
Starting from Nalhati Junction to Azimganj (AZ) line doubling and electrification project has been completed.
