= National Register of Historic Places listings in Rapides Parish, Louisiana =

Location of Rapides Parish in Louisiana

This is a list of the National Register of Historic Places listings in Rapides Parish, Louisiana.

This is intended to be a complete list of the properties and districts on the National Register of Historic Places in Rapides Parish, Louisiana, United States. The locations of National Register properties and districts for which the latitude and longitude coordinates are included below, may be seen in a map.

There are 82 properties and districts listed on the National Register in the parish. Another 6 properties were once listed but have been removed.

This National Park Service list is complete through NPS recent listings posted April 24, 2026.

== Current listings ==
	Name on the Register	Image	Date listed	Location	City or town	Description
1	Alexander State Forest Headquarters Building	Alexander State Forest Headquarters Building	May 21, 1987 (#87000771)	Alexander State Forest; 31°08′28″N 92°28′29″W	Woodworth	
2	Alexandria Garden District	Alexandria Garden District	April 9, 2001 (#01000336)	Roughly bounded by Marye St., Bolton Ave., White St., and Bayou Hynson; 31°17′59″N 92°27′32″W	Alexandria	
3	Alexandria Hall-Louisiana College	Alexandria Hall-Louisiana College	May 15, 1986 (#86001059)	Louisiana College; 31°19′31″N 92°25′36″W	Pineville	
4	Alexandria National Cemetery	Alexandria National Cemetery	July 9, 1997 (#97000767)	209 Shamrock Ave. 31°19′19″N 92°26′34″W	Pineville	part of the Civil War Era National Cemeteries Multiple Property Submission (MPS)
5	Alexandria Post-War Suburbs Historic District	Alexandria Post-War Suburbs Historic District	June 6, 2013 (#13000366)	Bounded by Bayou Hynson, Darby, Texas & Elliott Sts. 31°17′43″N 92°28′19″W	Alexandria	
6	Alexandria Veterans Administration Hospital Historic District	Alexandria Veterans Administration Hospital Historic District	September 29, 1986 (#86003116)	U.S. Routes 71/167; also 2495 Shreveport Hwy. 31°21′17″N 92°26′08″W	Alexandria	Listed as the "Veterans Administration Medical Center"; name changed and 2495 Shreveport added by a boundary increase of November 28, 2012
7	Bailey's Dam Site	Bailey's Dam Site	June 29, 1976 (#76000973)	Red River south of U.S. Route 71; 31°19′32″N 92°27′07″W	Alexandria	
8	Bayouside		March 26, 1980 (#80001757)	North of McNutt off Louisiana Highway 121; 31°18′48″N 92°38′38″W	McNutt	
9	Bennett Plantation House		May 14, 1979 (#79001083)	6291 Old Baton Rouge Highway; 31°13′16″N 92°25′11″W	Alexandria	
10	Bentley Hotel	Bentley Hotel	November 15, 1979 (#79001084)	801 3rd St. 31°18′43″N 92°26′42″W	Alexandria	
11	Blanchard House		July 22, 1982 (#82002793)	West of Boyce on Bayou Jean de Jean; 31°22′57″N 92°42′04″W	Boyce	
12	Bland House	Bland House	October 17, 1985 (#85003148)	330 Saint James St. 31°18′32″N 92°26′33″W	Alexandria	
13	Bohemian Community Hall		June 19, 2018 (#100002586)	94 Industrial Rd. 31°21′06″N 92°20′02″W	Libuse	
14	Bolton High School	Bolton High School	January 9, 1984 (#84001349)	2101 Vance Ave. 31°17′36″N 92°27′20″W	Alexandria	
15	James Wade Bolton House	James Wade Bolton House	November 15, 1979 (#79001085)	1330 Main St. 31°18′35″N 92°26′31″W	Alexandria	
16	Arna Wendell Bontemps House	Arna Wendell Bontemps House	September 13, 1993 (#93000886)	1327 3rd St. 31°18′34″N 92°26′34″W	Alexandria	
17	Boyce Methodist Church	Boyce Methodist Church	September 12, 2013 (#13000733)	309 Londonderry Ave. 31°23′25″N 92°40′06″W	Boyce	
18	Britt Place	Britt Place	November 21, 1980 (#80001756)	East of Glenmora on Lake Cocodrie Rd. 30°58′05″N 92°33′47″W	Glenmora	
19	J.E. Byram House		February 1, 2016 (#15001015)	915 City Park Blvd. 31°17′39″N 92°27′51″W	Alexandria	
20	Carnahan House	Carnahan House	April 7, 1995 (#95000373)	212 Ulster Ave. 31°23′29″N 92°40′08″W	Boyce	
21	Central Louisiana State Hospital Dairy Barn	Central Louisiana State Hospital Dairy Barn	May 15, 1986 (#86001078)	U.S. Route 165; 31°20′01″N 92°26′27″W	Pineville	
22	Central Louisiana State Hospital Historic District		March 27, 2025 (#100011575)	242 W. Shamrock Ave. 31°19′31″N 92°26′20″W	Pineville	
23	Chickama		May 31, 2016 (#16000302)	687 Chickamaw Rd. 31°06′43″N 92°25′35″W	Lecompte	
24	China Grove	China Grove	December 5, 1984 (#84000553)	Louisiana Highway 496; 31°18′48″N 92°38′06″W	Gardner	part of the Neo-Classical Architecture of Bayou Rapides Thematic Resource (TR)
25	Commercial Building	Commercial Building	November 29, 1978 (#78001436)	3rd and Johnston Sts. 31°18′38″N 92°26′37″W	Alexandria	
26	Cook House	Cook House	November 15, 1979 (#79001086)	222 Florence Ave. 31°18′24″N 92°27′39″W	Alexandria	
27	Cottingham House	Cottingham House	September 8, 1987 (#87001477)	1403 College Dr. 31°19′41″N 92°25′32″W	Pineville	
28	Crowell Sawmill Historic District		February 11, 1993 (#93000036)	11789 U.S. Route 165, S. 31°00′18″N 92°33′33″W	Longleaf	
29	Myrtle Groves Huie Dellmon House		January 31, 2017 (#100000603)	430 St. James St. 31°18′31″N 92°26′35″W	Alexandria	
30	Downtown Alexandria Commercial Historic District	Downtown Alexandria Commercial Historic District	August 8, 2018 (#100002588)	Bounded by 2nd, Jackson, Beauregard, 4th, 5th, 6th, Murray, Washington & Lee Sts. 31°18′37″N 92°26′41″W	Alexandria	
31	Eden	Eden	December 5, 1984 (#84000554)	Off Louisiana Highway 121; 31°19′53″N 92°40′42″W	Gardner	part of the Neo-Classical Architecture of Bayou Rapides TR
32	Emmanuel Baptist Church	Emmanuel Baptist Church	November 21, 2001 (#01001255)	430 Jackson St. 31°18′42″N 92°26′50″W	Alexandria	
33	First Methodist Church	First Methodist Church	June 6, 1980 (#80001751)	630 Jackson St. 31°18′37″N 92°26′54″W	Alexandria	
34	First United Methodist Church	First United Methodist Church	November 19, 2015 (#14001172)	2727 Jackson Ave. 31°17′38″N 92°27′58″W	Alexandria	
35	Fort Buhlow	Fort Buhlow	June 1, 1981 (#81000299)	Off U.S. Route 165; 31°19′07″N 92°26′56″W	Pineville	
36	Fort Randolph	Fort Randolph	June 1, 1981 (#81000300)	Off U.S. Route 165; 31°18′53″N 92°26′54″W	Pineville	
37	Gemiluth Chassodim Synagogue	Gemiluth Chassodim Synagogue	January 29, 2014 (#13001128)	2021 Turner St. 31°17′52″N 92°27′18″W	Alexandria	
38	Geneva		December 5, 1984 (#84000539)	Louisiana Highway 496; 31°18′50″N 92°30′48″W	Alexandria	part of the Neo-Classical Architecture of Bayou Rapides TR
39	Guaranty Bank, Park Avenue Branch	Guaranty Bank, Park Avenue Branch	January 23, 2013 (#12001206)	403 Bolton Ave. 31°18′26″N 92°27′24″W	Alexandria	
40	Hemenway Furniture Co. Building	Hemenway Furniture Co. Building	October 4, 1983 (#83003632)	3rd and Jackson Sts. 31°18′44″N 92°26′46″W	Alexandria	
41	Mayer Hirsch House	Mayer Hirsch House	July 26, 1979 (#79001087)	1216 Jackson St. 31°18′30″N 92°44′06″W	Alexandria	
42	Hope		December 13, 1984 (#84003856)	Off Louisiana Highway 121 and Mill Race Rd. 31°18′43″N 92°39′05″W	McNutt	part of the Neo-Classical Architecture of Bayou Rapides TR. Included in McNutt Rural Historic District.
43	Inglewood Plantation Historic District		January 14, 1988 (#87002449)	Off U.S. Route 71; 31°13′43″N 92°25′12″W	Alexandria vic.	98 acre historic district with two plantation houses and 22 support buildings
44	Island Home		December 5, 1984 (#84000557)	On Bayou Rapides off Louisiana Highway 121; 31°19′49″N 92°40′35″W	McNutt	part of the Neo-Classical Architecture of Bayou Rapides TR. Included in McNutt Rural Historic District.
45	Wade H. Jones Sr. House		August 27, 1987 (#87001428m)	Meeker Rd. 31°03′17″N 92°23′06″W	Meeker	
46	Kent Plantation House	Kent Plantation House	August 5, 1971 (#71000362)	West of Alexandria on Bayou Rapides at Virginia Ave. 31°18′11″N 92°28′58″W	Alexandria	
47	Lamourie Lock	Lamourie Lock	October 14, 1994 (#94001218)	Junction of Lamourie Rd. and U.S. Route 71; 31°07′46″N 92°24′24″W	Lecompte	
48	Lecompte High School	Lecompte High School	September 22, 1992 (#92001251)	1610 Charter St. 31°05′23″N 92°24′12″W	Lecompte	
49	Huey P. Long Memorial Hospital	Huey P. Long Memorial Hospital	June 24, 2015 (#15000362)	352 Hospital Blvd. 31°19′16″N 92°26′25″W	Pineville	
50	Longview		December 5, 1984 (#84000559)	Across Bayou Rapides from Louisiana Highway 121 near its intersection with Louisiana Highway 1200; 31°19′44″N 92°40′40″W	Gardner	part of the Neo-Classical Architecture of Bayou Rapides TR
51	Loyd Hall Plantation		April 29, 1977 (#77000678)	Northwest of Cheneyville on Loyd Bridge Rd. 31°02′04″N 92°21′18″W	Cheneyville	
52	Masonic Building	Masonic Building	January 16, 1986 (#86000079)	4th and Johnston Sts. 31°18′36″N 92°26′42″W	Alexandria	
53	Masonic Home for Children	Masonic Home for Children	November 20, 1987 (#87002038)	2145 Horseshoe Dr. 31°15′34″N 92°28′41″W	Alexandria	
54	Dr. Robert E. McGill House	Dr. Robert E. McGill House	June 2, 2000 (#00000566)	2704 Hill St. 31°17′35″N 92°27′49″W	Alexandria	
55	McNutt Rural Historic District	McNutt Rural Historic District	September 15, 1988 (#88001595)	Belgard Bend Rd. and Louisiana Highway 121; 31°18′44″N 92°38′40″W	McNutt	Rural community running a mile along south side of Bayou Rapides. Includes Hope and Bayouside.
56	McNutt School		September 26, 1997 (#97001182)	720 Millrace Rd. 31°18′23″N 92°39′30″W	Boyce	
57	Meeker Sugar Refinery	Meeker Sugar Refinery	November 16, 1987 (#87002023)	U.S. Route 71; 31°03′30″N 92°22′43″W	Meeker	
58	Melady House	Melady House	February 23, 1996 (#96000160)	5800 England Dr. 31°19′53″N 92°30′40″W	Alexandria	
59	Mt. Olivet Episcopal Church and Cemetery	Mt. Olivet Episcopal Church and Cemetery	June 22, 2000 (#00000718)	335 Main St. 31°19′05″N 92°26′22″W	Pineville	
60	Myrtlewood	Myrtlewood	August 28, 2012 (#12000556)	2301 Military Hwy. 31°20′39″N 92°25′19″W	Pineville	
61	Old Alexandria Public Library	Old Alexandria Public Library	January 19, 1989 (#88003225)	503 Washington St. 31°18′31″N 92°26′43″W	Alexandria	
62	Old LSU Site	Old LSU Site	August 14, 1973 (#73000876)	North of Pineville at 2500 Shreveport Highway; 31°21′31″N 92°26′14″W	Pineville	
63	Old Pineville Town Hall	Old Pineville Town Hall	March 6, 2024 (#100010047)	731 Main Street; 31°19′20″N 92°26′04″W	Pineville	
64	Pegram Plantation House		October 24, 2003 (#03001064)	881 Chickamaw Rd. 31°05′55″N 92°25′46″W	Lecompte	
65	Rapides Bank and Trust Company Building	Rapides Bank and Trust Company Building	May 15, 1980 (#80001752)	933 Main St. 31°18′43″N 92°26′39″W	Alexandria	
66	Rapides Cemetery	Rapides Cemetery	June 15, 1979 (#79001088)	Hardtner and Main Sts. 31°19′00″N 92°26′30″W	Pineville	
67	Rapides Parish Library	Rapides Parish Library	January 26, 2016 (#15001005)	411 Washington St. 31°18′34″N 92°26′40″W	Alexandria	
68	Rosalie Plantation Sugar Mill		January 2, 1976 (#76000974)	South of Alexandria off U.S. Route 71; 31°12′07″N 92°24′41″W	Alexandria	
69	Rose Cottage	Rose Cottage	September 15, 1983 (#83000535)	Azalea St. 31°19′51″N 92°26′16″W	Pineville	
70	Rugg Elementary School	Rugg Elementary School	August 10, 2001 (#01000807)	1319 Bush Ave. 31°17′42″N 92°27′46″W	Alexandria	
71	St. Francis Xavier Cathedral	St. Francis Xavier Cathedral	December 3, 1980 (#80001753)	626 4th St. 31°18′44″N 92°26′52″W	Alexandria	
72	St. John Baptist Church		June 25, 1982 (#82002794)	Off Louisiana Highway 456; 31°07′51″N 92°24′37″W	Lecompte	
73	St. Philip's Episcopal Church	St. Philip's Episcopal Church	February 8, 2012 (#12000004)	414 Clare St. 31°23′17″N 92°40′00″W	Boyce	
74	C.A. Schnack Jewelry Company Store	C.A. Schnack Jewelry Company Store	June 30, 2000 (#00000684)	924 3rd St. 31°18′40″N 92°26′42″W	Alexandria	
75	Shiloh Baptist Church		July 16, 2024 (#100010516)	930 Washington Street; 31°18′24″N 92°26′51″W	Alexandria	
76	Tioga Commissary	Tioga Commissary	October 16, 1986 (#86002880)	Tioga Rd. 31°22′59″N 92°25′43″W	Tioga	
77	Trinity Episcopal Church	Trinity Episcopal Church	October 16, 1980 (#80001754)	Bayou Rapides; 31°01′20″N 92°17′23″W	Cheneyville	
78	Tyrone Plantation		March 14, 2019 (#100003456)	6576 Bayou Rapides Rd. 31°18′42″N 92°33′44″W	Alexandria	
79	US Post Office and Courthouse-Alexandria	US Post Office and Courthouse-Alexandria	May 18, 2000 (#00000501)	515 Murray St. 31°18′38″N 92°45′40″W	Alexandria	
80	Morgan Walker House		January 22, 1987 (#86003682)	2400 Horseshoe Dr. 31°15′27″N 92°28′20″W	Alexandria	
81	Walnut Grove		November 21, 1980 (#80001755)	East of Cheneyville; 31°00′37″N 92°15′30″W	Cheneyville	
82	Welcek Farmstead		July 18, 1985 (#85001586)	Louisiana Highway 107; 31°16′37″N 92°18′53″W	Kolin	

== Former listings ==
	Name on the Register	Image	Date listed	Date removed	Location	City or town	Description
1	Conerly House		December 5, 1984 (#84000534)	June 11, 2015	Off U.S. Route 71; 31°18′46″N 92°27′58″W	Alexandria	part of the Neo-Classical Architecture of Bayou Rapides TR. Relocated in 2004.
2	Hopson House		December 5, 1984 (#84000549)	November 29, 2016	Brown's Bend Rd. 31°19′01″N 92°29′47″W	Alexandria	part of the Neo-Classical Architecture of Bayou Rapides TR
3	Senator John H. Overton House		July 18, 1985 (#85001584)	November 29, 2016	1128 8th St. 31°18′25″N 92°26′44″W	Alexandria	Demolished in 1997.
4	Oxland		December 5, 1984 (#84000551)	November 29, 2016	Louisiana Highway 1202; 31°19′35″N 92°34′35″W	Alexandria	part of the Neo-Classical Architecture of Bayou Rapides TR
5	Rapides Lumber Company Sawmill Manager's House		November 26, 1990 (#90001753)	March 31, 2015	Junction of U.S. Route 165 and Castor Plunge Rd. 31°08′49″N 92°29′51″W	Woodworth	
6	Rapides Opera House		June 11, 1981 (#81000298)	December 28, 2015	1125 3rd St. 31°18′38″N 92°26′36″W	Alexandria	Roof collapsed in late 1984, and was demolished in February and March, 1985.

== See also ==
- List of National Historic Landmarks in Louisiana
- National Register of Historic Places listings in Louisiana
