= Meeker =

Meeker may refer to:

== Places ==
=== Jurisdictions ===
- Camp Meeker, California
- Meeker, Colorado
- Meeker, Louisiana
- Meeker, Ohio
- Meeker, Oklahoma
- Meeker, West Virginia
- Meeker, Wisconsin
- Meeker County, Minnesota
- Meekers Grove, Wisconsin

=== Landforms ===
- Meeker Peak, Nevada
- Meeker Slough, California
- Mount Meeker, Colorado

=== Structures ===
- Meeker and Marcy Avenues Line, Brooklyn New York
- Meeker Island Lock and Dam, Minnesota
- Meeker Southern Railroad, Washington
- Meeker Sugar Refinery, Louisiana
- Meeker's Hardware, Connecticut

== People with the surname ==
- Arthur Meeker, Jr. (1902–1971), American novelist
- Bradley B. Meeker (1813–1873), American jurist
- Charles Meeker, American politician
- Edward Meeker (1874–1937), American singer and performer
- Ezra Meeker (1830–1928), American pioneer who promoted the preservation of the Oregon Trail
- George Meeker (1904–1984), American actor
- Howie Meeker (1923–2020), Canadian hockey player and politician
- Jacob Edwin Meeker (1878–1918), American politician
- James Meeker (born 1995), American baseball player
- Joseph Rusling Meeker (1827–1887), American painter
- Josephine Meeker (1857–1882), American teacher and physician
- Jotham Meeker (1804–1855), Baptist missionary to the Indians in Kansas
- Judith Meeker, American founder of More Than Warmth
- Leonard C. Meeker (1916–2014), American politician, lawyer and diplomat
- Marie Meeker (1886–1960), known as Dainty Marie, American vaudeville performer
- Marilyn Meeker, American ice dancer
- Mary G. Meeker (born 1959), American investment banker and securities analyst
- Mary N. Meeker (1921–2003), American educational psychologist
- Mike Meeker (born 1958), Canadian ice hockey player
- Nathan Meeker (1817–1879), 19th-century homesteading entrepreneur in Colorado, USA, victim of Meeker Massacre
- Ralph Meeker (1920–1988), American actor
- Roy Meeker (1900–1929), American baseball player
- Royal Meeker (1873–1953), American economist
- Samuel Meeker (1763–1831), descendant of William Meeker, prominent early citizen of Philadelphia
- Theresa Meeker (born 1986), Italian-American actress
- Tony Meeker (born 1939), American politician in Oregon
- William Meeker, founder of Elizabeth, New Jersey in 1660

== Characters ==
- Meeker, bailiff in the 1955 play Inherit the Wind
- Meeker, character in the 2002 Nickelodeon film Clockstoppers
- Dink Meeker, character in Orson Scott Card's Ender's Game series
- Timothy Meeker, protagonist of My Brother Sam Is Dead

== Other uses ==
- Howie Meeker's Hockey School, Canadian television program
- USS Meeker County (LST-980), US Navy tank landing ship
