= Carnahan =

Carnahan may refer to:

== People ==
- the Carnahan family from Missouri, including
  - Mel Carnahan (1934–2000), American lawyer and politician
- Herschel L. Carnahan (1879–1941), American politician
- James Carnahan (1775–1859), American clergyman and educator
- Jean Carnahan (1933–2024), American politician and writer
- Jennifer Carnahan (born 1976), American politician
- Joe Carnahan (born 1969), American film director, screenwriter, and producer
- J. P. Carnahan (1832–1912), American mathematician and politician
- Matthew Carnahan (born 1961), American producer, writer, and director
- Matthew Michael Carnahan, American screenwriter
- Norman F. Carnahan (born 1942), American chemical engineer
- Robert H. Carnahan (1823–1913), American military officer
- Scott Carnahan (born 1953), American professional tennis player
- Suzanne Carnahan, birth name of Susan Peters (1921–1952), American actress
- Alex Carnahan (a.k.a. Lex), character from the TV series Containment
- Evelyn Carnahan, character from The Mummy film series

== Places ==
- Carnahan Courthouse, Missouri
- Carnahan High School of the Future, Missouri
- Carnahan House, Louisiana
- Carnahan House (Pine Bluff, Arkansas)
- Carnahan Run, Pennsylvania
