= Schnack =

Schnack is a word from Low German which refers to a chat or in derogative meaning a gossip.

Schnack is a surname. Notable people with the name include:

- A. J. Schnack, American documentary filmmaker
- Anton Schnack (1892–1973), German writer
- Filip Schnack (born 2001), German actor
- Larry G. Schnack, American academic
- Yasmin Schnack (born 1988), American tennis player

== See also ==
- C.A. Schnack Jewelry Company Store, Commercial buildings on the National Register of Historic Places in Louisiana
