= Neil Haven Klock =

American politician (1896–1978)

Member of the Louisiana House of Representatives
- In office 1940–1944

Personal details
- Born: November 9, 1896
- Died: August 10, 1978 (aged 81) Veterans Administration Hospital; Alexandria, Louisiana
- Party: Democratic
- Spouse: Olive Ruth Cloud (m. 1922; died. 1926)
- Children: 5
- Education: Texas A&M University

Neil Haven Klock (November 9, 1896 – August 10, 1978) was an American politician. He served as a Democratic member of the Louisiana House of Representatives.

Klock was the son of John Charles Klock. He attended Texas A&M University and served in the United States Army during World War I. At one time he ran the Meeker Sugar Refinery, a syrup business, with his brother Ernest Klock.

In 1940, Klock won election to the Louisiana House of Representatives where he served until 1944. He was a farmer when he retired. Klock was a member of Trinity Episcopal Church in Cheneyville, Louisiana. At the time of his death he resided in Alexandria, Louisiana.

Klock died in August 1978 in the Veterans Administration Hospital in Alexandria, at the age of 81. He was buried in Trinity Episcopal Cemetery.
