= Carl Gunter Jr. =

American politician (1938–1999)

Carl Newton Gunter Jr.

Member of the Louisiana House of Representatives from the 27th district
- In office 1972–1992
- Preceded by: T. C. Brister
- Succeeded by: Rick L. Farrar

Personal details
- Born: October 16, 1938 Alexandria, Louisiana, U.S.
- Died: July 6, 1999 (aged 60) Kolin, Louisiana, U.S.
- Resting place: Holloway Cemetery in Rapides Parish
- Party: Democratic

Carl Newton Gunter Jr. (October 16, 1938 – July 6, 1999), was a Democratic member of the Louisiana House of Representatives from 1972 to 1992.

Gunter was born in Alexandria, to Carl N. "Euddie" Gunter Sr. (June 23, 1916 – November 10, 1975), and Gladys Slay Gunter Richardson (April 18, 1920 – January 14, 2009) His paternal grandparents were John Gunter (January 31, 1886 – July 26, 1963) and Mary Hooper Gunter (May 21, 1895 – January 6, 1976). His maternal grandparents were Charles O. "Buck" Slay Sr. (November 3, 1894 – September 10, 1967), and the former Louella Sullivan (September 22, 1899 – December 13, 1996).

== Early years ==
Gunter was the oldest of five children. His siblings are John O. Gunter, Travis Gunter, and a sister, Gladys Mae Gunter Norris. The other brother, Elton Wayne Gunter (February 12, 1946 – February 17, 1947), died from a childhood illness.

In 1957, Gunter married his high school sweetheart, the former Jessie Paulk (born 1940), and they had six children. Carl N. Gunter, III (born 1959), Rhonda Doreen Gunter (September 3, 1960 – February 20, 1962), Melody Gunter Slocum, Penny Gunter Rosier, Fancy Gunter Manton, and Ryan Travis Gunter (born 1967). At the time of his death, Gunter had thirteen grandchildren.

Gunter worked as an offshore roustabout and opened a business called Pineville Motor Parts.

== As state representative ==
Maybe there's some way you can teach somebody to manage a child who can't be managed at home, but I don't know what it is. – Carl N. Gunter Jr.

In 1991, Louisiana State Senator Allen Ray Bares (pronounced BAH REZ) of Lafayette sponsored a bill to outlaw most abortions in Louisiana. The National Organization for Women's national secretary, Kim Gandy, originally from Bossier City, directed a nine-month-long "grassroots organizing and recruiting effort" against the bill. In a debate over the bill's provision regarding incest, Gunter stated that "That's how we get thoroughbred race horses." Gunter's advocates argue that he was asserting that fetuses conceived within an incestuous relationship should also have a right to life. The comparison with race horses, however, was used against him by his opponents.

Gunter already had a longtime contentious relationship with the local press. Former colleague Claude "Buddy" Leach of Leesville, who delivered Gunter's eulogy, told how Gunter once threatened Governor Edwin Washington Edwards into removing businessman Joe D. Smith Jr., then publisher of the local newspaper, Alexandria Daily Town Talk from the LSU Board of Supervisors.

The result of it all was that both Gunter and Bares were defeated.

The Feminist Majority Foundation wrote in the 1991 edition of Feminist Chronicles that the defeats of Bares and Gunter were "among the sweetest victories" of the year. Gunter's choice of words will always be the subject of speculation and Louisiana political lore.

== Death and legacy ==
In 1998, Gunter was diagnosed with cancer. He died on July 6, 1999, at his home at the age of sixty. He is interred at the Holloway Cemetery in Rapides Parish. Gunter was of Czech extraction and formerly resided in the community of Libuse.

== Notes ==
1. Philadelphia Cemetery
2. Holloway Cemetery
3. Slay Cemetery, Holloway, La.
4. Delhomme Funeral Home, Lafayette, La.

Preceded by T. C. Brister	Louisiana State Representative for District 27; 1972–1992	Succeeded by Rick L. Farrar
