= Red River and Gulf Railroad =

American logging railroad under restoration

The Red River and Gulf Railroad (RR&G) was a railroad in Louisiana, United States, which ran from 1905 to 1954. It went from Lecompte to Long Leaf and on to Kurthwood, with branch lines extending from Long Leaf to Meridian. Today the Southern Forest Heritage Museum operates the RR&G as a one-mile loop around the town and mill complex of Long Leaf.

== History ==
In the early 1920s, the Meridian Lumber Company shipped logs over the Red River and Gulf Railroad to the town of Meridian for processing.

As of 1941, it was 58 miles long, extending from one corner of Camp Claiborne.
