= Bohemian Community Hall =

1930 Czech social hall in Louisiana, US

Bohemian Community Hall, also known as the Libuse Czech Hall, is a historic social hall building for the Czech community in Libuse, Louisiana. It is listed on the National Register of Historic Places. It is at 94 Industrial Road.

It was built in 1930 to replace the previous hall that was destroyed in a tornado.

It hosts the Czech Heritage Days Festival.

A historical marker commemorates the Libuse Czech Colony.

== See also ==
- National Register of Historic Places listings in Rapides Parish, Louisiana
