= St. John Baptist Church (Lecompte, Louisiana) =

Historic church in Louisiana, United States

- U.S. National Register of Historic Places
- Location within Louisiana Location within the United States
- Nearest city: Lecompte, Louisiana
- Coordinates: 31°7′51″N 92°24′37″W
- Area: 0.2 acres (0.081 ha)
- Built: 1888
- Architectural style: Queen Anne-Eastlake
- NRHP reference No.: 82002794
- Added to NRHP: June 25, 1982

The St. John Baptist Church near Lecompte, Louisiana is a historic church in rural Rapides Parish, facing northeast towards Bayou Lamourie, which is a stream or river.

It is a small clapboard church building with elaborate Eastlake/Queen Anne architecture in the United States ornamentation. It has a square tower at its northeast corner with bracketed, flared eaves. The entrances to the church, one at the base of the tower, "are particularly ornate with their half-timbered gabled porticos with bargeboard trim and turned columns and balusters." There is stained glass in a Palladian window in the front gable, and also in round-arched fanlights above the other windows.

In 1982, there was a small frame building adjacent to the listed property, to the northwest, which was the Lamourie Colored School, which had operated from around 1893 to 1954, when it was moved to its current location and then served as a social hall for the church.

It is located in what may now be known as the hamlet of Lamourie, which appears on maps now, between Lecompte and Alexandria, Louisiana.
