= Pegram Plantation House =

Historic house in Louisiana, United States

- U.S. National Register of Historic Places
- Location within Louisiana Location within the United States
- Nearest city: Lecompte, Louisiana
- Coordinates: 31°5′55″N 92°25′46″W
- Area: 7.8 acres (3.2 ha)
- Built: c.1850
- Architectural style: Greek Revival
- NRHP reference No.: 03001064
- Added to NRHP: October 24, 2003

The Pegram Plantation House, perhaps also known as Peagram Plantation House, is located in Lecompte, Louisiana, and was built around 1850. It was added to the National Register of Historic Places on October 24, 2003.

It is a one-story Greek Revival-style galleried house.
