= Rick L. Farrar =

American politician (1960–2018)

Member of the Louisiana House of Representatives from the 27th district
- In office 1992–1996
- Preceded by: Carl Gunter Jr.
- Succeeded by: Randy Wiggins
- In office 2000–2008
- Preceded by: Randy Wiggins
- Succeeded by: Chris Hazel

Personal details
- Born: Rick Lamar Farrar; February 12, 1960 Alexandria, Louisiana, U.S.
- Died: December 18, 2018 (aged 58) New Orleans, Louisiana, U.S.
- Party: Democratic
- Spouse: Dana Newman
- Children: 2
- Education: University of Louisiana at Monroe; Southern University Law Center (JD)

Rick Lamar Farrar (February 12, 1960 – December 18, 2018) was an American politician. He served as a Democratic member for the 27th district of the Louisiana House of Representatives.

Farrar was born in Alexandria, Louisiana. Farrar attended the University of Louisiana at Monroe, where he earned a bachelor's degree in 1985. He earned a Juris Doctor at Southern University Law Center in 1991. In 1992 Farrar was elected for the 27th district of the Louisiana House of Representatives, serving until 1996. He served two further terms from 2000 to 2008. Farrar practised law at the Pineville law firm Farrar & Farrar, and at the Rapides Parish District Attorney's Office.

Farrar died in December 2018 at the Ochsner Baptist Medical Center in New Orleans, Louisiana, at the age of 58.
