= Longview (Gardner, Louisiana) =

Historic house in Louisiana, United States

- U.S. National Register of Historic Places
- Location within Louisiana Location within the United States
- Nearest city: Gardner, Louisiana
- Coordinates: 31°19′44″N 92°40′40″W
- Area: 1 acre (0.40 ha)
- Built: 1850
- Architectural style: Greek Revival
- MPS: Neo-Classical Architecture of Bayou Rapides TR
- NRHP reference No.: 84000559
- Added to NRHP: December 5, 1984

Longview is located in Gardner, Louisiana. It was added to the National Register of Historic Places in 1984.

It was listed as one result of a study of 10 Neo-Classical farm-plantation houses along Bayou Rapides. As for several of the others (Eden, China Grove, Geneva, Hope, Island Home), Longview was modified by addition of hood along its original gallery, termed a false gallery, which provides additional protection from the rain, detracting somewhat but not greatly from its original appearance.
