= Lecompte High School =

- U.S. National Register of Historic Places
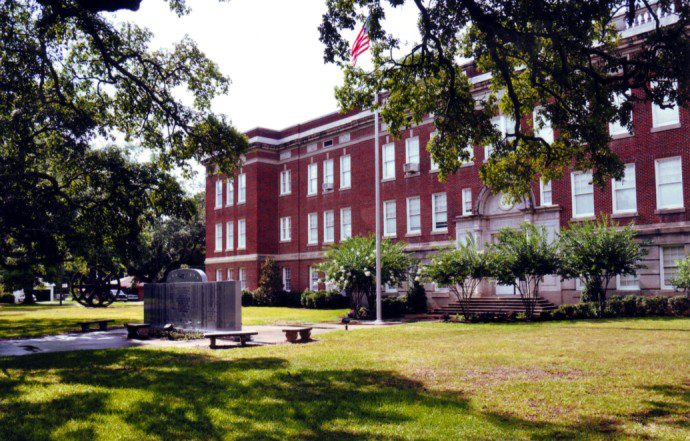

- Location within Louisiana Location within the United States
- Location: 1610 Charter St., Lecompte, Louisiana
- Coordinates: 31°05′23″N 92°24′12″W
- Area: 6.2 acres (2.5 ha)
- Built: 1924
- Architect: Yeager, Scott, Sr.; Quick, W.J.
- Architectural style: Classical Revival, Beaux Arts
- NRHP reference No.: 92001251
- Added to NRHP: September 22, 1992

Lecompte High School is a former public school located in Lecompte, Louisiana that opened in 1924 and closed in 1967. The Class of 1966 was the last graduating class. It was always a school with grades one through twelve for those years. It continued for several more years as an elementary school. The property was deeded to the Town of Lecompte by the Rapides Parish School Board. The Save the School Foundation which later became the LHS Foundation, saved the school, repaired and renovated it, and turned most of the classrooms into museum rooms containing local and state history. There are several thousand items and artifacts on view. The Old school belongs to the Town of Lecompte, but the town has contracted with the LHS Corporation to run, maintain and improve the property and museum rooms. It currently contains the Johnson Public Library, the Senior Citizens Center and the Youth Recreation program. Various rooms and the auditorium are available for rent or special occasions. It was added to the National Register of Historic Places on September 22, 1992.
