= Welcek Farmstead =

Historic house in Louisiana, United States

- U.S. National Register of Historic Places
- Location within Louisiana Location within the United States
- Location: LA 107, Kolin, Louisiana
- Coordinates: 31°16′37″N 92°18′53″W
- Area: 12.3 acres (5.0 ha)
- Architect: Welcek, Francis J.
- Architectural style: Bungalow/Craftsman
- NRHP reference No.: 85001586
- Added to NRHP: July 18, 1985

Welcek Farmstead is a Czech American farmstead located in Kolin, Louisiana. It was added to the National Register of Historic Places on July 18, 1985.
