= Walnut Grove (Cheneyville, Louisiana) =

Historic house in Louisiana, United States

- U.S. National Register of Historic Places
- Location within Louisiana Location within the United States
- Nearest city: Cheneyville, Louisiana
- Coordinates: 31°0′37″N 92°15′30″W
- Area: 4 acres (1.6 ha)
- Built: 1830
- Architect: Jabez Tanner
- Architectural style: Federal
- NRHP reference No.: 80001755
- Added to NRHP: 21 November 1980

Walnut Grove is a historic house located 0.2 miles (0.32 km) southwest of Bayou Rapides and about 2 miles (3.2 km) southeast of Cheneyville, Louisiana.

== Description and history ==
This plantation house was designed by Jabez Tanner and built in 1830. It is a two-story building with a modified central hall plan and a hip roof. A front porch was added in 1927 and there has been reworking of the ground floor including closing in the previously open central hall. A Queen Anne stairway and arch have also been added. There is a new construction tin roof with roof hatchway. The house originally featured a large formal garden in the front. The two story brick building is an example of Federal architecture with its five bay articulation, fanlights and hip roof. It was added to the National Register of Historic Places on November 21, 1980.

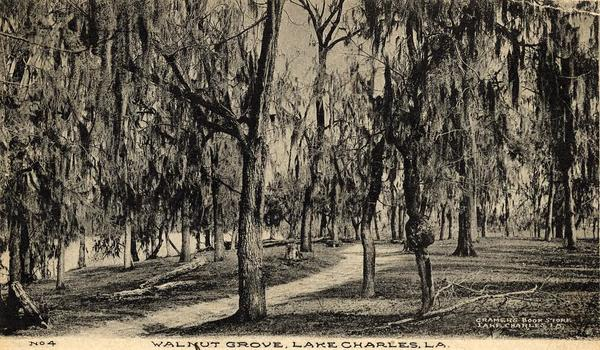
Illustration of a walnut grove in Lake Charles, Louisiana in 1910

== See also ==
- Historic preservation
- National Register of Historic Places in Rapides Parish, Louisiana
- Slavery in the United States
