= Eden (Gardner, Louisiana) =

Historic house in Louisiana, United States

- U.S. National Register of Historic Places
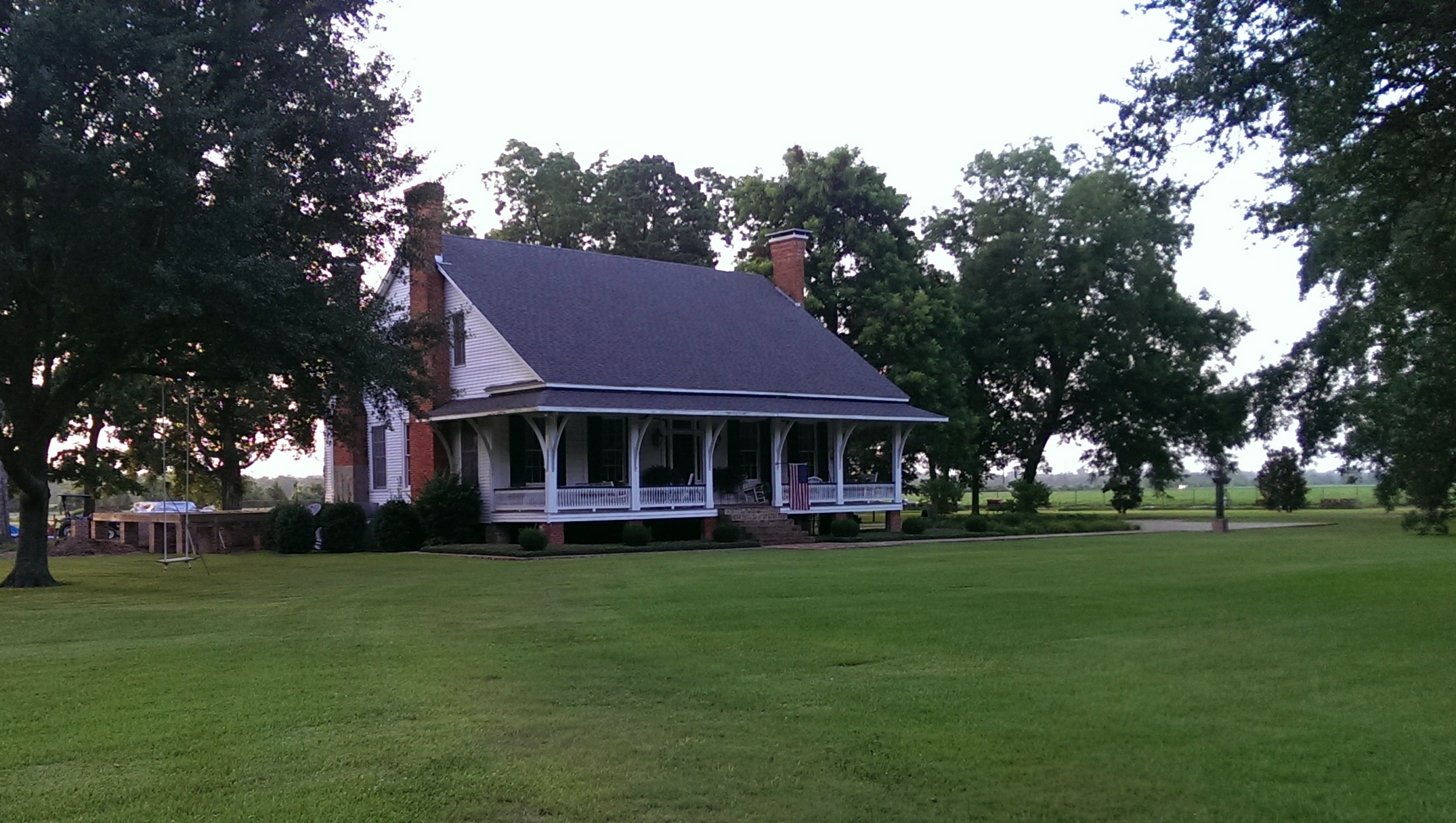

- Location within Louisiana Location within the United States
- Nearest city: Gardner, Louisiana
- Coordinates: 31°19′53″N 92°40′42″W
- Area: 1 acre (0.40 ha)
- Built: c.1850
- Architectural style: Greek Revival
- MPS: Neo-Classical Architecture of Bayou Rapides TR
- NRHP reference No.: 84000554
- Added to NRHP: December 5, 1984

Eden near Gardner, Louisiana is a house built perhaps around 1850. It was added to the National Register of Historic Places in 1984.

It is a central hall plan house, two rooms deep, with a rear ell wing. While family history suggests it was built around 1830 by Pleasant H. Hunter, evidence such as its heavy ogee moldings suggest a later date. In 1984, its original four chimneys and four aedicule style mantels survived.

It is located off Highway 121, near its intersection with Highway 1200, about 4 miles (6.4 km) from Boyce, Louisiana.

It was listed as one result of a study of 10 Neo-Classical farm-plantation houses along Bayou Rapides. As for several of the others (China Grove, Geneva, Hope, Island Home, Longview, Eden was modified by addition of hood along its original gallery, termed a false gallery, which provides additional protection from the rain, detracting somewhat but not greatly from its original appearance.
