= Island Home =

Historic house in Louisiana, United States

- U.S. National Register of Historic Places
- Location within Louisiana Location within the United States
- Nearest city: Gardner, Louisiana
- Coordinates: 31.330553°N 92.676575°W
- Area: 1 acre (0.40 ha)
- Built: c.1850
- Architectural style: Greek Revival
- MPS: Neo-Classical Architecture of Bayou Rapides TR
- NRHP reference No.: 84000557
- Added to NRHP: December 5, 1984

Island Home is a historical house in Rapides Parish, Louisiana, in or near Gardner. It was built around 1850 and listed on the National Register of Historic Places in 1984.

It is off Louisiana Highway 21 and is reached by a bridge across Bayou Rapides.

It is a central hall plan house with a five-bay front facade, with elements of Classical Revival style; it is basically Greek Revival. Its entrance is unusual with its side lights rising to the level of the transom above the door. It is two rooms deep, with a rear ell wing. Changes to the building over the years were deemed not too damaging for it to be listed.

It was listed as one result of a study of ten Neoclassical farm-plantation houses along Bayou Rapides. As were several of the others (China Grove, Eden, Geneva, Hope, Longview), Island Home was modified by addition of a hood along its original gallery, termed a false gallery, which provides additional protection from the rain, detracting somewhat but not greatly from its original appearance.
