= Melady House =

Historic house in Louisiana, United States

- U.S. National Register of Historic Places
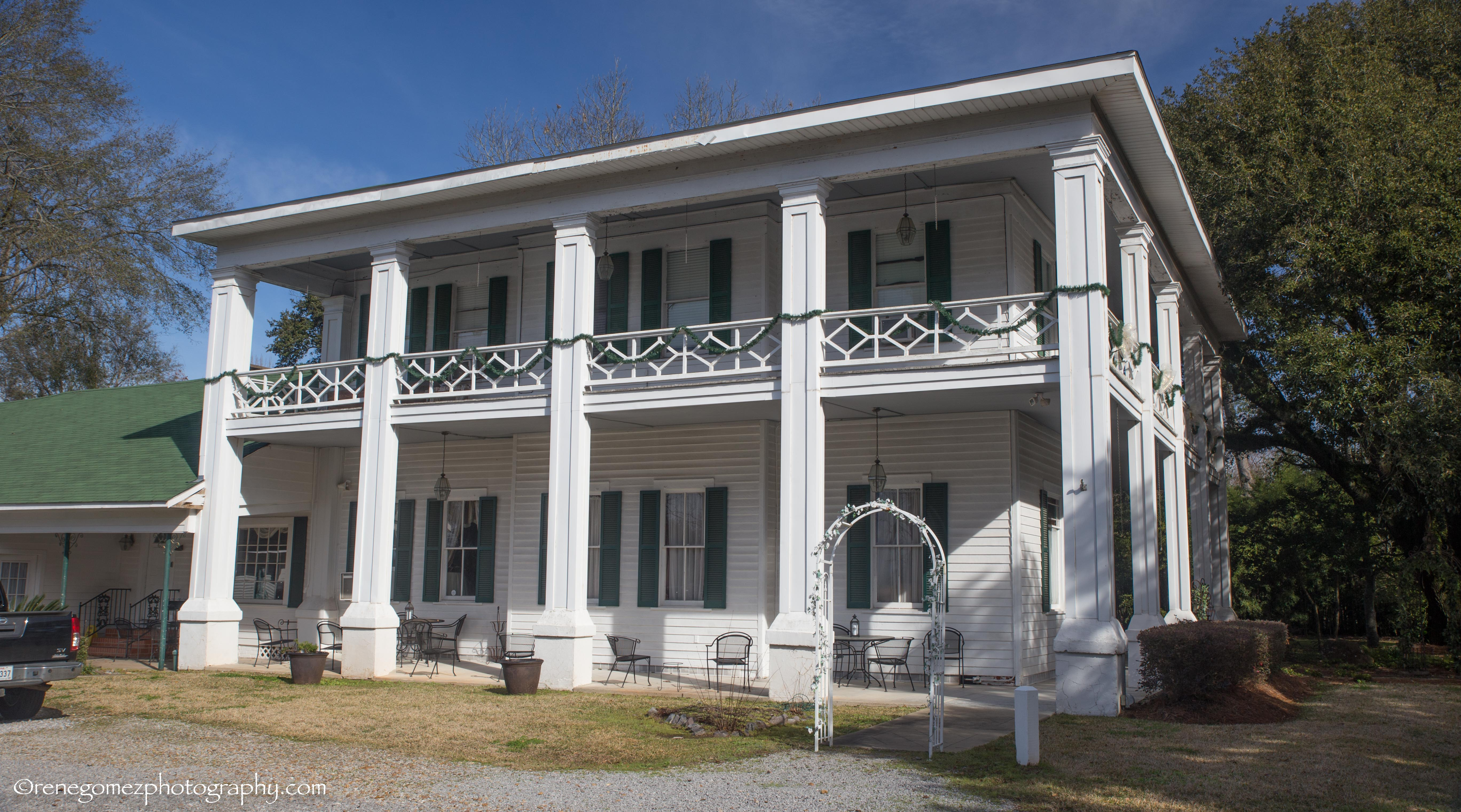
- Melady House in 2019

- Location within Louisiana Location within the United States
- Location: 5800 England Dr., Alexandria, Louisiana
- Nearest city: Alexandria, Louisiana
- Coordinates: 31°19′53″N 92°30′40″W
- Area: 3.6 acres (1.5 ha)
- Built: c. 1905
- Architectural style: Colonial Revival
- NRHP reference No.: 96000160
- Added to NRHP: 23 February 1996

Melady House is a historic house in Alexandria, Louisiana.

The house is located at 5800 England Drive. It was built c. 1905 in Rapides Parish in the Colonial Revival style. The property was added to the National Register of Historic Places on February 23, 1996.

== See also ==
- Historic preservation
- National Register of Historic Places in Rapides Parish, Louisiana
