= McNutt School =

- U.S. National Register of Historic Places
- Location within Louisiana Location within the United States
- Nearest city: Boyce, Louisiana
- Coordinates: 31°18′23″N 92°39′30″W
- Area: less than 1 acre (0.40 ha)
- Built: 1910
- NRHP reference No.: 97001182
- Added to NRHP: 26 September 1997

The McNutt School is a historic building located near Boyce, Louisiana. The small (16.25 by 28 feet (4.95 by 8.53 m) wood frame one–room schoolhouse is located on a hilltop in the community of McNutt in Rapides Parish. Built in 1910 it was added to the National Register of Historic Places on September 26, 1997.

== See also ==
- Historic preservation
- History of education in the United States
- National Register of Historic Places listings in Rapides Parish, Louisiana
