= Rugg Elementary School =

- U.S. National Register of Historic Places
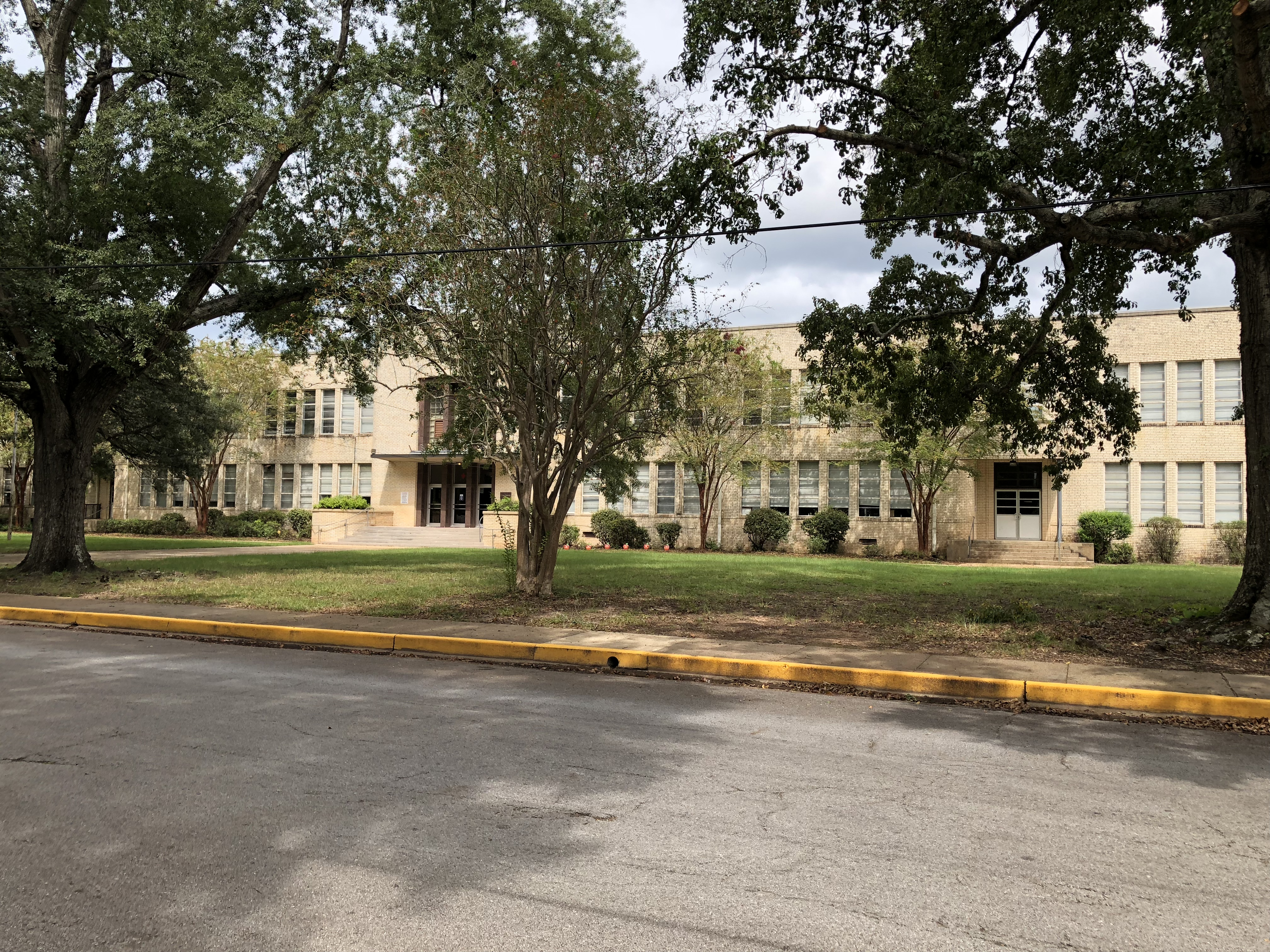
- The school in 2018

- Location within Louisiana Location within the United States
- Location: 1319 Bush Ave. Alexandria, Louisiana
- Coordinates: 31°17′42″N 92°27′46″W
- Area: 4 acres (1.6 ha)
- Built: 1940
- Architectural style: Modern Movement
- NRHP reference No.: 01000807
- Added to NRHP: 10 August 2001

Rugg Elementary School is located in Alexandria, Louisiana. Built in 1940 it was added to the National Register of Historic Places on August 10, 2001.

== Description and history ==
The footprint of the school is typical of the period with a long main block and centered rear wing with an auditorium/gym. The two story blonde brick building sits about 100 feet (30 m) from the street behind a grass lawn with mature trees.

The school was named the Bush Avenue Grammar School when it opened on January 22, 1940. During the 1947–8 school year it was renamed Brame Grammar School. Since the beginning of the 1953–4 term it has been named after Luzon Strausbury Rugg who was principal from 1943 to 1949.

== See also ==
- Historic preservation
- History of Education in the United States
- National Register of Historic Places in Rapides Parish, Louisiana
