= Long Leaf, Louisiana =

- Unincorporated community
- Location within Louisiana Location within the United States
- Coordinates: 31°00′24″N 92°33′10″W
- Country: United States
- State: Louisiana
- Parish: Rapides
- Elevation: 128 ft (39 m)
- Time zone: UTC-6 (Central (CST))
  - Summer (DST): UTC-5 (CDT)
- ZIP code: 71448
- Area code: 318
- GNIS feature ID: 547628

Long Leaf is an unincorporated community in Rapides Parish, Louisiana, United States. Its ZIP code is 71448.

== History ==
The former company town was once the site of a large sawmill complex of the Crowell and Spencer Lumber Company, part of which is now preserved at the Southern Forest Heritage Museum and Research Center. Multiple buildings that originally belonged to the sawmill are now on the National Register of Historic Places. The Red River and Gulf Railroad, which serviced the Long Leaf sawmill, is currently undergoing restoration.
