= Meeker, Louisiana =

- Unincorporated community
- Location within Louisiana Location within the United States
- Coordinates: 31°3′23.68″N 92°22′50.48″W
- Country: United States
- State: Louisiana
- Parish: Rapides
- Time zone: UTC-6 (Central (CST))
  - Summer (DST): UTC-5 (CDT)
- ZIP code: 71346
- GNIS feature ID: 543463

Meeker, Louisiana is an unincorporated community of Rapides Parish, Louisiana. It is located on Bayou Boeuf, south of Lecompte, Louisiana where U.S. Route 167 joins with U.S. Route 71 in Louisiana. It was historically a center of the sugarcane industry in Central Louisiana, with sugarcane plantations, sugar mills and a sugar refinery.

== History ==
The area had been settled by sugarcane planters as early as 1840s, with record of the Home Place sugar plantation. The Wells family, of Governor James Madison Wells, owned the Wellswood sugar plantation, historically at an oak grove; old-growth oaks mark the driveway. Wellswood was where the racehorse Lecomte, namesake of nearby Lecompte, Louisiana, was born in 1850 and raised by Wellswood slave Hark West.

Louisiana historian Sue Eakin conjectured that Meeker was founded by 1882, owning to the Texas and Pacific Railway railroad line; she posits it to be have been named after the locally prominent Meeker brothers, Samuel F. Meeker and Joseph H. Meeker, who occupied the Home Place estate. Samuel was a doctor and three-time representative of Rapides at the Louisiana House of Representatives. Joseph was a successful planter of sugarcane in Northern Louisiana, despite the economic boom of cotton farming at the time.

Joseph ran a sugar mill in Meeker by 1890. Following Joseph's death, Samuel took over the Home Place estate and arranged for expansion of the Meeker sugar mill. The Meeker Sugar Refinery was built in 1912 by Chicagoan industrialists associated with the Cracker Jack Company, becoming the northernmost Louisianan sugar refinery; it later became a farmers cooperative in 1948, and ultimately shut down in 1982. Local cane planting ended at the same time.

=== Historic sites ===
- Wade H. Jones Sr. House
- Meeker Sugar Refinery

== Major throughways ==
- U.S. Route 71 in Louisiana
- U.S. Route 167
- Louisiana Highway 456
- Northup Trail
