= Arna Wendell Bontemps House =

Historic house in Louisiana, United States

- U.S. National Register of Historic Places
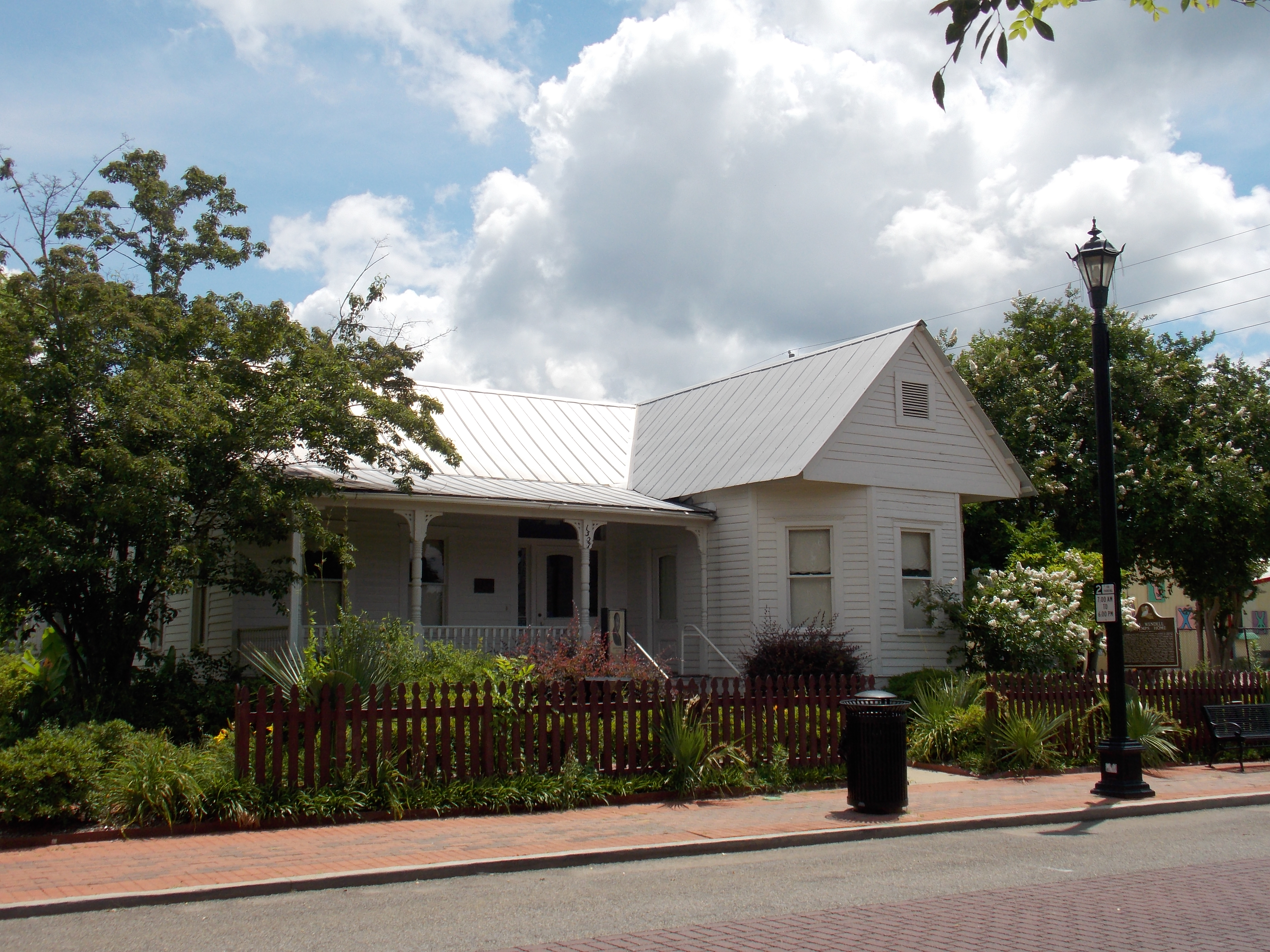

- Location within Louisiana Location within the United States
- Location: 1327 Third St. Alexandria, Louisiana
- Coordinates: 31°18′34″N 92°26′34″W
- Area: less than one acre
- Architectural style: Queen Anne
- NRHP reference No.: 93000886
- Added to NRHP: September 13, 1993

Arna Wendell Bontemps House is located in Alexandria, Louisiana. On October 13, 1902, author Arna Wendell Bontemps was born there.

It was the childhood home of Arna Wendell Bontemps.

Avoiding demolition due to construction of Interstate 49, the house was moved six blocks, in 1991. And it was then renovated.

It was added to the National Register of Historic Places on September 13, 1993.
