= Geneva (Alexandria, Louisiana) =

Historic house in Louisiana, United States

- U.S. National Register of Historic Places
- Location within Louisiana Location within the United States
- Nearest city: Alexandria, Louisiana
- Coordinates: 31°18′50″N 92°30′48″W
- Area: 1 acre (0.40 ha)
- Built: 1829
- Architectural style: Greek Revival, Federal
- MPS: Neo-Classical Architecture of Bayou Rapides TR
- NRHP reference No.: 84000539
- Added to NRHP: December 5, 1984

Geneva, also called the Vanderlick House, is a historic house near Alexandria, Louisiana.

It was one of ten farm-plantation houses along Bayou Rapides that illustrate the "Neo-Classical Architecture of Bayou Rapides" on the National Register of Historic Places. As with several of the others (Eden, China Grove, Hope, Island Home, Longview), Geneva was modified by the addition of a hood along its original gallery, termed a false gallery, which provides additional protection from the rain, detracting slightly from its original appearance.

It was added to the National Register of Historic Places on December 5, 1984.
