= Hope (McNutt, Louisiana) =

Historic house in Louisiana, United States

- U.S. National Register of Historic Places
- Location within Louisiana Location within the United States
- Location: Off Louisiana Highway 121 and Mill Race Rd., McNutt, Louisiana
- Coordinates: 31°18′43″N 92°39′5″W
- Area: 1 acre (0.40 ha)
- Built: 1880
- Architectural style: Greek Revival
- Part of: McNutt Rural Historic District (ID88001595)
- MPS: Neo-Classical Architecture of Bayou Rapides TR
- NRHP reference No.: 84003856

Significant dates
- Added to NRHP: December 13, 1984
- Designated NRHP: September 15, 1988

Hope is located in Rapides Parish, Louisiana, in the rural community of McNutt, Louisiana. It was added to the National Register of Historic Places on December 13, 1984. It is also a contributing building in the McNutt Rural Historic District.

It was listed as one result of a study of 10 Neo-Classical farm-plantation houses along Bayou Rapides. As for several of the others (Eden, China Grove, Geneva, Island Home, Longview), Hope was modified by addition of hood along its original gallery, termed a false gallery, which provides additional protection from the rain, detracting somewhat but not greatly from its original appearance.
