= Crowell Sawmill Historic District =

Historic district in Louisiana, United States

- U.S. National Register of Historic Places
- U.S. Historic district
- Location within Louisiana Location within the United States
- Location: 11789 US 165 S, Long Leaf, Louisiana
- Coordinates: 31°0′18″N 92°33′33″W
- Area: 90 acres (36 ha)
- Built: 1901
- Architectural style: Sawmill complex
- NRHP reference No.: 93000036
- Added to NRHP: February 11, 1993

The Crowell Sawmill Historic District is located in Long Leaf, Louisiana. It is a 90 acres (36 ha) historic district which was added to the National Register of Historic Places in 1993. The district included 21 contributing buildings, six contributing structures, and eight contributing objects.

Additional documentation was filed in 2008 which explains the district has "state-level industrial significance as a rare and immensely important example of a historic sawmill complex within Louisiana." The additional documentation notes that the district had become known as the Southern Forest Heritage Museum, and that the first sawmill in the district, built in 1892, had burned, and that the surviving replacement was built in 1900–01. It also asserted that the "Crowell sawmill played an indirect but very significant role in the Allied victory over the Axis powers in World War II."

It is located at 11789 U.S. 165 South.
