= Rapides Lumber Company Sawmill Manager's House =

Historic house in Louisiana, United States

- Formerly listed on the U.S. National Register of Historic Places
- Location within Louisiana Location within the United States
- Location: Jct. of US 165 and Castor Plunge Rd., Woodworth, Louisiana
- Coordinates: 31°8′49″N 92°29′51″W
- Area: 1 acre (0.40 ha)
- Architectural style: Colonial Revival, Bungalow/Craftsman
- NRHP reference No.: 90001753

Significant dates
- Added to NRHP: November 26, 1990
- Removed from NRHP: March 31, 2015

Rapides Lumber Company Sawmill Manager's House is located in Woodworth, Louisiana. It was added to the National Register of Historic Places on November 26, 1990. It was delisted in 2015.
