= USS Meeker County =

1944 LST-542-class tank landing ship

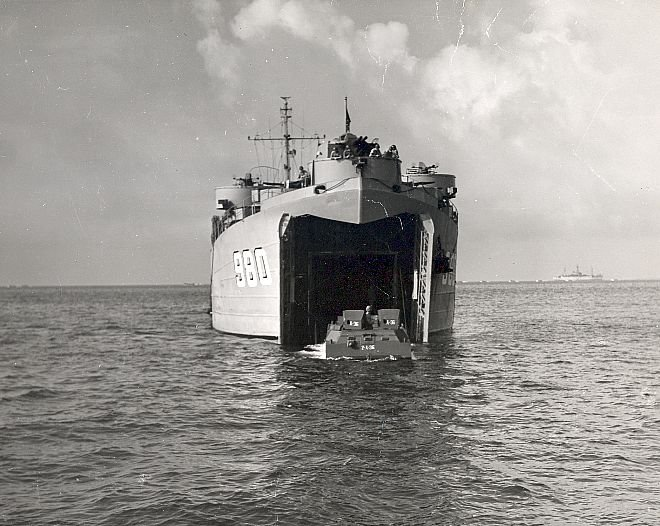
- USS LST-980 unloads an LVT during "Exercise Camid III", for an "assault" on Bloodsworth Island in the Chesapeake Bay.

History

United States
- Name: LST-980 (1944–1955); Meeker County (1955–1975)
- Namesake: Meeker County, Minnesota
- Builder: Boston Navy Yard, Massachusetts
- Laid down: 22 December 1943
- Launched: 10 February 1944
- Commissioned: 19 March 1944
- Decommissioned: 16 December 1955
- Renamed: Meeker County, 1 July 1955
- Identification: Hull symbol: LST-980; Hull symbol: AGP-15; Code letters: NKXT
- Honors and awards: 1 × battle star (World War II)
- Fate: Laid up in the Atlantic Reserve Fleet, Green Cove Springs Group, 16 December 1955; Transferred to Atlantic Reserve Fleet, Philadelphia Group, October 1961; Recommissioned into US Navy
- Recommissioned: 23 September 1966
- Decommissioned: December 1970
- Stricken: 1 April 1975
- Honors and awards: 10 × campaign stars (Vietnam War)
- Fate: Sold for scrapping, 1 December 1975; Sold and converted for commercial use, 1976

Singapore
- Name: LST-3
- Owner: Landing System Technology Pte. Ltd., Singapore
- Acquired: 1976
- Fate: Sold, 30 June 1978

Greece
- Name: Petrola 143
- Owner: Maritime & Commercial Co., Argonaftis S.A., Panama
- Acquired: 30 June 1978
- Identification: IMO number: 7629893
- Fate: Sold for scrapping, 7 August 1996

General characteristics
- Class & type: LST-542-class tank landing ship
- Displacement: 1,625 long tons (1,651 t) (light); 4,080 long tons (4,145 t) (full (seagoing draft with 1,675 short tons (1,520 t) load); 2,366 long tons (2,404 t) (beaching)
- Length: 328 ft (100 m) oa
- Beam: 50 ft (15 m)
- Draft: Unloaded: 2 ft 4 in (0.71 m) forward; 7 ft 6 in (2.29 m) aft; Full load: 8 ft 3 in (2.51 m) forward; 14 ft 1 in (4.29 m) aft; Landing with 500 short tons (450 t) load: 3 ft 11 in (1.19 m) forward; 9 ft 10 in (3.00 m) aft; Limiting 11 ft 2 in (3.40 m); Maximum navigation 14 ft 1 in (4.29 m)
- Installed power: 2 × 900 hp (670 kW) Electro-Motive Diesel 12-567A diesel engines; 1,800 shp (1,300 kW)
- Propulsion: 1 × Falk main reduction gears; 2 × Propellers
- Speed: 11.6 kn (21.5 km/h; 13.3 mph)
- Range: 24,000 nmi (44,000 km; 28,000 mi) at 9 kn (17 km/h; 10 mph) while displacing 3,960 long tons (4,024 t)
- Boats & landing craft carried: 2 x LCVPs
- Capacity: 1,600–1,900 short tons (3,200,000–3,800,000 lb; 1,500,000–1,700,000 kg) cargo depending on mission
- Troops: 16 officers, 147 enlisted men
- Complement: 13 officers, 104 enlisted men
- Armament: Varied, ultimate armament; 2 × twin 40 mm (1.57 in) Bofors guns; 4 × single 40 mm Bofors guns; 12 × 20 mm (0.79 in) Oerlikon cannons

USS Meeker County (LST-980) was an LST-542-class tank landing ship built for the United States Navy during World War II. Like many of her class, she was not named and is properly referred to by her hull designation. Later named after Meeker County, Minnesota, she was the only US Naval vessel to bear the name.

== Construction ==
Originally laid down as LST-980 on 22 December 1943, at the Boston Navy Yard; the ship was launched on 10 February 1944; sponsored by Mrs. Orrion R. Hewitt; and commissioned on 19 March 1944.

== Service history ==
=== World War II, 1944–1945 ===
In April 1944, after completing shakedown exercises in Chesapeake Bay, LST-980 loaded equipment and got underway for England, where plans for the invasion of France had been stalled in debate over the need for shipping, a need and resultant disagreement so acute that Prime Minister Winston Churchill had quipped, "The destinies of two great empires...seem to be tied up in some God-damned things called LSTs."

Upon arriving in England, LST-980 underwent further amphibious training and by early June, stood ready for "D-Day." On 5 June the ships of "Operation Overlord" sortied from the English coast and on 6 June, the Allies landed on the Normandy beaches. Participating in the invasion, LST-980 was bracketed by bombs, one of which, a 125-pound (57 kg) dud, penetrated the hull and two bulkheads, killing one man and causing minor damage. After the establishment of the beachhead, the landing ship remained in the area providing shuttle service between the United Kingdom and France. Carrying men and equipment to France, she returned to England with prisoners of war, transporting upwards of 900 at one time.

LST-980 returned to the United States in February 1945 and was assigned to training activities along the east coast for the remainder of the war.

=== Post-war activities, 1945–1955 ===
Following the war she remained at Little Creek, Virginia, and continued her training operations, extending them to the Caribbean and the Gulf of Mexico. Those included participation in CAMID I, II, and III, joint Army-Navy operations to acquaint US Naval Academy cadets and midshipmen with amphibious warfare. On 30 April 1949, LST-980 departed Little Creek, for the Mediterranean and five months' duty with the 6th Fleet. Returning to her base on 4 October, she resumed east coast operations. With only three interruptions, two resupply missions to the Baffin Bay area in the summers of 1951 and 1952, and a two-month tour as support LST for Marines on Vieques Island, in 1954, she continued to provide amphibious training to Naval and Marine Corps personnel until July 1955.

Renamed Meeker County on 1 July 1955, she steamed to New York, in mid-July to begin inactivation. On 23 September, she arrived at Green Cove Springs, Florida, to complete the process. Decommissioning on 16 December 1955, she remained in the Florida Group, Atlantic Reserve Fleet, until transferred to the Philadelphia Group in October 1961.

=== Vietnam War, 1966–1970 ===
In 1965, an urgent need for amphibious types caused Meeker County to be reactivated. Modernized at Baltimore, she recommissioned on 23 September 1966, underwent intensive training at Little Creek, and on 20 January 1967, departed for her new home port, Guam. She arrived at Apra Harbor, Guam, on 7 April, and then sailed for South Vietnam, for a tour of duty as a unit of Landing Ship Squadron 3. Operating from Da Nang, she provided almost continuous support to combat operations in Vietnam into 1970.

=== Decommissioning and sale ===
Decommissioned in December 1970, at Bremerton, Washington, Meeker County was struck from the Naval Vessel Register on 1 April 1975. Sold for scrapping by Defense Reutilization and Marketing Service (DRMS), on 1 December 1975, she was in turn sold to Max Rouse & Sons of Beverly Hills, California, and taken in hand by Marine Industries, Tacoma, Washington, for conversion to commercial use. Sold in 1976, to Landing System Technology Pte. Ltd. of Singapore (Lauritz Kloster, Norway) and renamed LST-3, the ship arrived at Piraeus, Greece, having been acquired by Maritime & Commercial Co. Argonaftis S.A., Panama (Greek flag) on 30 June 1978, and renamed Petrola 143. After nearly two decades she arrived in tow at Aliağa, Turkey, for demolition by Seltas A.S. on 7 August 1996.

== Awards ==
LST-980 received one battle star for World War II service, as Meeker County ten campaign stars for service during the Vietnam War.

== Bibliography ==
Online resources

- "LST-980". Dictionary of American Naval Fighting Ships. Naval History and Heritage Command. This article incorporates text from this source, which is in the public domain.
- "Meeker County". Dictionary of American Naval Fighting Ships. 7 August 2015. This article incorporates text from this source, which is in the public domain.
- "USS Meeker County (LST-980)". NavSource. 1 May 2015.

Printed resources

- Morison, Samuel Eliot (1957). History of United States Naval Operations in World War II, Vol. 11: The Invasion of France and Germany 1944–1945. Little, Brown & Co. p. 28.
