= Wade H. Jones Sr. House =

Historic house in Louisiana, United States

- U.S. National Register of Historic Places
- Location within Louisiana Location within the United States
- Location: Meeker Road, Meeker, Louisiana
- Coordinates: 31°3′17″N 92°23′6″W
- Area: 5.3 acres (2.1 ha)
- Built: 1913, 1935
- Built by: Wade H. Jones, Sr. (1935 remodelling)
- Architect: Charles T. Roberts (1935 remodelling)
- Architectural style: Colonial Revival
- NRHP reference No.: 87001428
- Added to NRHP: August 27, 1987

The Wade H. Jones Sr. House, also known as the Kleiner House, is a historic house located on Meeker Road in Meeker, Louisiana. It was built in 1935 in the Colonial Revival style. It was added to the National Register of Historic Places in 1987.

It is a two-story brick house built in 1913 and was renovated in 1935. It has a portico with four monumental two-story Tuscan columns added in the renovation. Also added were a porte-cochere on one side and a sunporch on the other. An effect of the renovation was to bring the house into, broadly speaking, Colonial Revival style.
