= Mayer Hirsch House =

Historic house in Louisiana, United States

- U.S. National Register of Historic Places
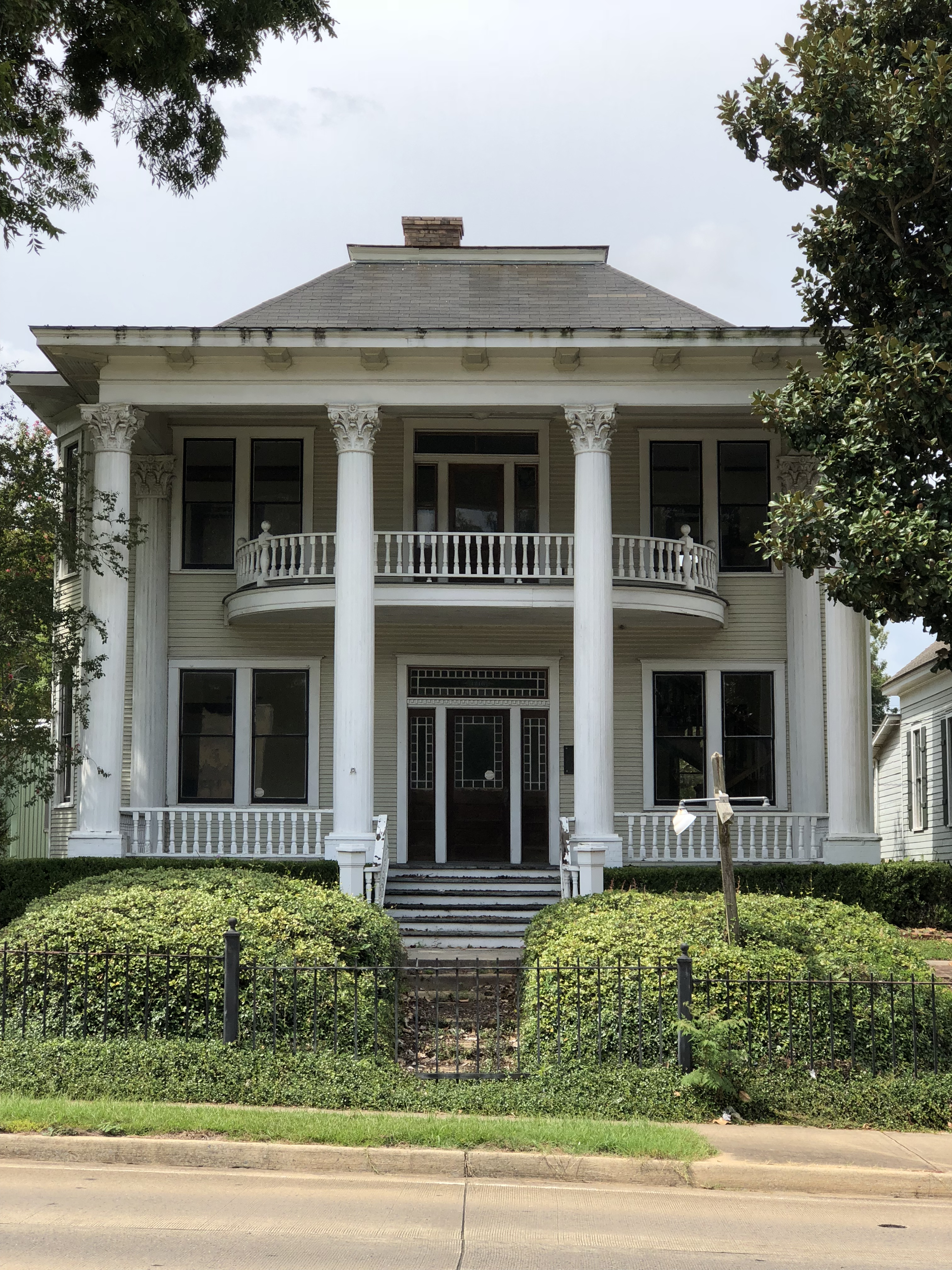

- Location within Louisiana Location within the United States
- Location: 1216 Jackson St., Alexandria, Louisiana
- Coordinates: 31°18′30″N 92°44′06″W
- Area: 0.3 acres (0.12 ha)
- Built: 1910
- Architect: Hirsch, Mayer
- Architectural style: Neo-Georgian
- NRHP reference No.: 79001087
- Added to NRHP: July 26, 1979

The Mayer Hirsch House in Alexandria, Louisiana was built around 1910. It was added to the National Register of Historic Places on July 26, 1979.

It is Neo-Georgian in style. It has a colossal portico, "easily the grandest portico of any turn-of-the-century house in the city".

== See also ==
- Alexander State Forest
