= Bayouside =

Historic house in Louisiana, United States

- U.S. National Register of Historic Places
- U.S. Historic district – Contributing property
- Location within Louisiana Location within the United States
- Location: McNutt, Louisiana
- Coordinates: 31°18′48″N 92°38′38″W
- Area: 1 acre (0.40 ha)
- Built: c.1847
- Built by: John Augustin Texada
- Part of: McNutt Rural Historic District (ID88001595)
- NRHP reference No.: 80001757

Significant dates
- Added to NRHP: March 26, 1980
- Designated CP: September 15, 1988

Bayouside is located on the south side of Bayou Rapides on a slight ridge, in the rural community of McNutt, Louisiana, about 12 miles (19 km) west of Alexandria in Rapides Parish, Louisiana. It was listed on the National Register of Historic Places in 1980. It is also a contributing building in McNutt Rural Historic District.

It is a Creole raised plantation house showing influence of Greek Revival or Classical Revival architecture, with a five bay gallery having a full entablature and posts with heavy molded capitals.

The house was built in about 1847 by John Augustin Texada (1789-1869) who came to the area in 1809. It was sold a few years after his death to the Bank of America, then bought at auction in 1876 by Milton Dunnam for $4600, then remained in the Dunnam family until 1969. At the time of NRHP listing, the house was owned by a descendant of John A. Texada who had been restoring it since 1970.
