= Oxland =

Historic house in Louisiana, United States

- Formerly listed on the U.S. National Register of Historic Places
- Location within Louisiana Location within the United States
- Nearest city: Alexandria, Louisiana
- Coordinates: 31°19′35″N 92°34′35″W
- Area: 1 acre (0.40 ha)
- Built: 1825
- Architectural style: Greek Revival, Federal
- MPS: Neo-Classical Architecture of Bayou Rapides TR
- NRHP reference No.: 84000551

Significant dates
- Added to NRHP: December 05, 1984
- Removed from NRHP: November 29, 2016

Oxland is located in Alexandria, Louisiana. It was added to the National Register of Historic Places on December 5, 1984, and was delisted in 2016.
