= McNutt Rural Historic District =

Historic district in Louisiana, United States

- U.S. National Register of Historic Places
- U.S. Historic district
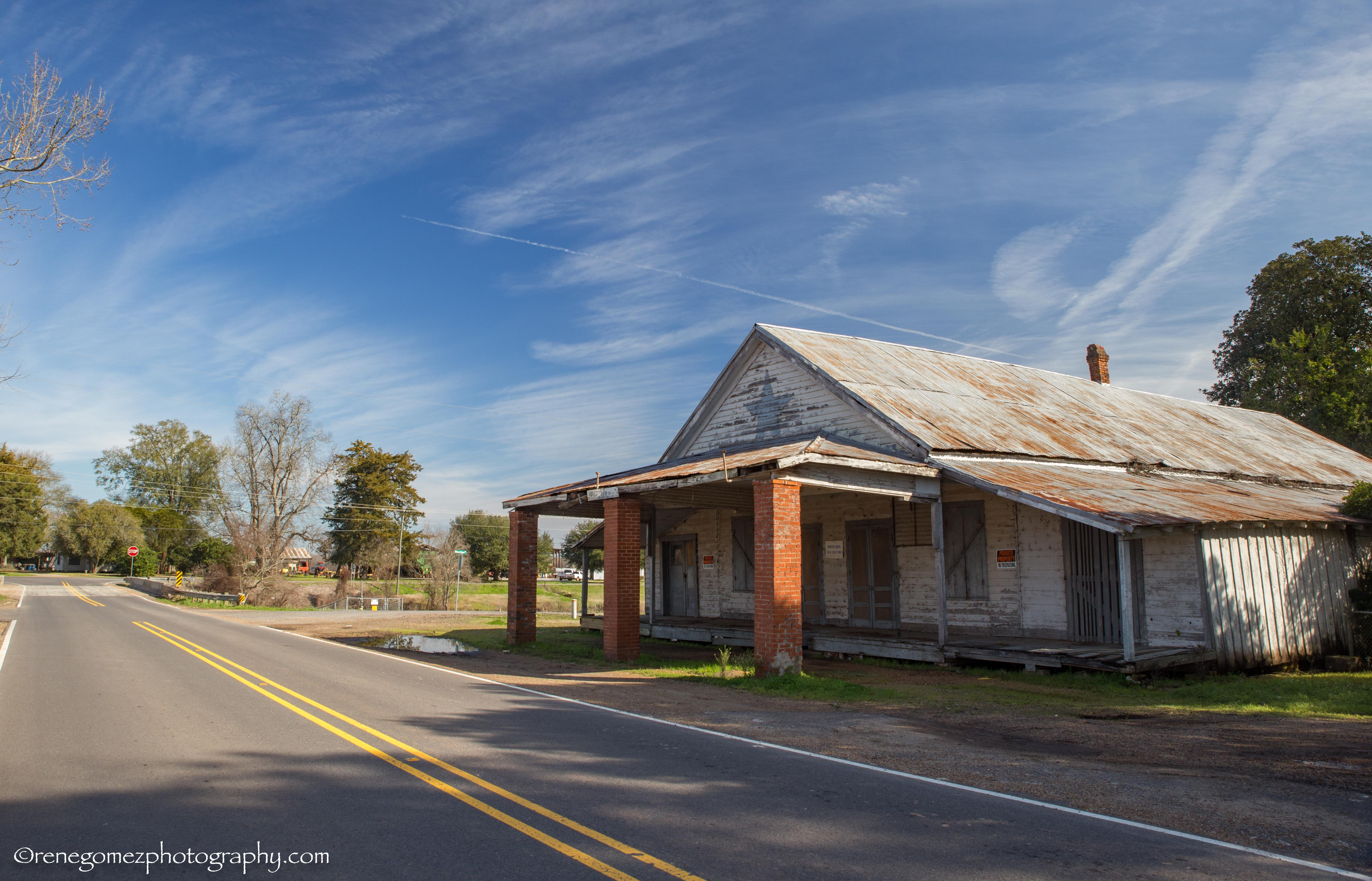
- McNutt Gin, which faces west onto LA 121. Just past is Belgard Bend Road on the south side of the bayou, then the bayou, then Hot Wells Road along the north side of the bayou.

- Location within Louisiana Location within the United States
- Location: Belgard Bend Rd. and LA 121, McNutt, Louisiana
- Coordinates: 31°18′44″N 92°38′40″W
- Area: 80 acres (32 ha)
- Architectural style: Greek Revival
- NRHP reference No.: 88001595
- Added to NRHP: September 15, 1988

McNutt Rural Historic District is located in Rapides Parish, Louisiana around the intersection of Belgard Bend Rd. and Louisiana Highway 121 that make up the rural community of McNutt, Louisiana. It was added to the National Register of Historic Places on September 15, 1988. McNutt is named from "McNutt Hill," itself named for Isaac McNut], the son-in-law of John Texada, a federal land agent in the area in the early 1800s.

The 80 acres (32 ha) area included 28 contributing buildings and 11 non-contributing ones in 1988, along an east-west road (named Belgard Bend Road and/or Mill Race Road) along the curved south side of narrow Bayou Rapides. North-south Louisiana Highway 121 crosses the district and Bayhou Rapides at its center, the location of McNutt Mill. It does not include buildings along east-west Hot Wells Road (Louisiana Highway 496) along the north side of the bayou. It is about 13 miles east of Alexandria, Virginia.

In flat cotton-growing land along Bayou Rapides, it "is a crossroads cotton community consisting of five principal residences, a cotton gin, a store, and nine contributing quarters houses and copious outbuildings. Contributing elements range in date from 1847 to c.1930."

The district includes two Greek Revival structures: the principal plantation house, Bayouside, and Hope, both of which are separately listed on the National Register.

"Bayouside was built by the Texada family. The name McNutt was applied to the settlement surrounding Bayouside by Albert E. Hunter sometime between 1904 and 1908. The settlement was noted as McNutt when it became a post village in 1908. In addition to twenty-eight historic buildings, McNutt contains three former gin sites, one dating from the antebellum period, one dating from the 1880s, and one dating from 1928. The district runs for close to a mile along a curve on the south side of Bayou Rapides. Although there are some gaps, the buildings are in easy sight of each other, and thus there is a broad and open cohesiveness. Some of the major residences have treed yards, but most of the land is open, being still farmed for cotton. Even the largest buildings in the district tend to be humble and unpretentious. Bayouside (National Register), the district's most impressive structure, is a substantial Greek Revival galleried cottage with Doric posts and aedicule style mantels. It has a spacious front lawn overlooking the bayou which is delineated from adjacent properties by mature trees along the edges. The only other Greek Revival structure is Hope (National Register), a late example dating from c.1880. It features plain posts with slight molded capitals and an enormous false gallery (added c.1900)."
