= Tioga Commissary =

- U.S. National Register of Historic Places
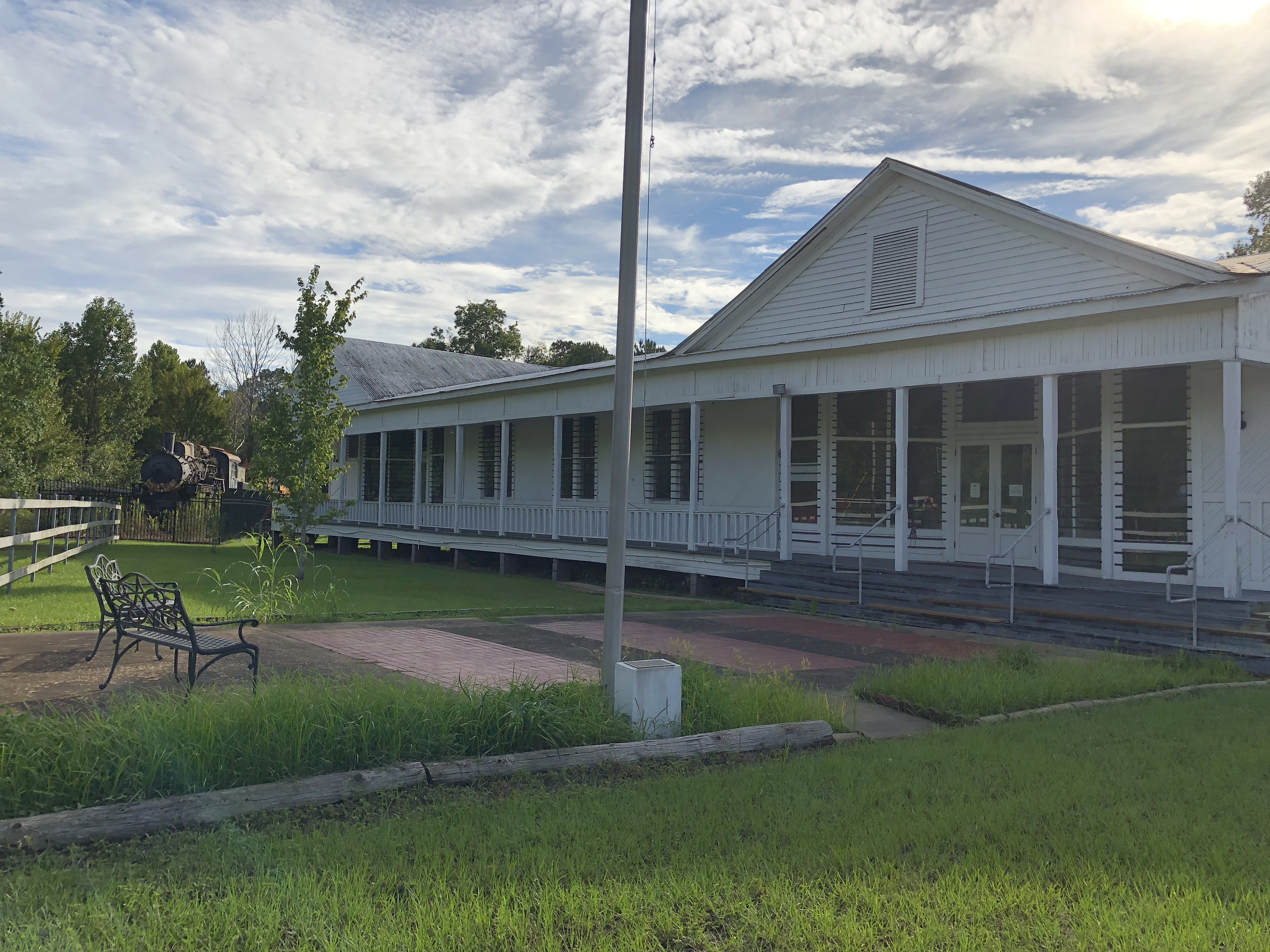

- Location within Louisiana Location within the United States
- Location: Tioga Rd., Tioga, Louisiana
- Coordinates: 31°22′59″N 92°25′43″W
- Area: 0.5 acres (0.20 ha)
- Built: 1900
- Architect: Lee Lumber Co.
- NRHP reference No.: 86002880
- Added to NRHP: October 16, 1986

Tioga Commissary is located in Tioga, Louisiana. It was added to the National Register of Historic Places on October 16, 1986.

Located north of Alexandria the Commissary is part of the Tioga Heritage Park and Museum

In 1905 Stephen Lee purchased a sawmill, built by Julius Levin, and surrounding land from Daniel F. Clark, owner of Union Lumber Company. Lee constructed the rural Commissary to meet the needs of his employees at Lee Lumber Company and Tioga & Southeastern Railway Company. The building served as a department store, grocery, post office, and general gathering place for decades.

== Historic Landmark ==
The Tioga Commissary was added to the National Register of Historic Places on October 16, 1986.

According to the Historic Landmark plaque, after the sawmill's closure in 1925 the Commissary was sold to Sam Allen, who operated it until 1947. Soon after, it was sold to longtime employee Rudolph Merritt, who operated the community store until its closure in 1981. The 1986 Registry Nomination form lists the then-owner as Fred Price.

== Preservation ==
In 2009, through the efforts of Tioga Historical Society, the building opened as part of the Louisiana Museum System. Exhibits focused on early life in Tioga, timber business, railroad line, and the Louisiana Maneuvers that trained soldiers for combat during World War II. An undated “news” page announced the Museum's closure due to unstable conditions of building and lack of funding from the State for repair. Memories and photos of the Commissary can still be shared on their social media page.
