= Conerly House =

- Formerly listed on the U.S. National Register of Historic Places
- Location within Louisiana Location within the United States
- Nearest city: Alexandria, Louisiana
- Coordinates: 31°18′46″N 92°27′58″W
- Area: 0.5 acres (0.20 ha)
- Built: 1880
- Architectural style: Greek Revival
- MPS: Neo-Classical Architecture of Bayou Rapides TR
- NRHP reference No.: 84000534

Significant dates
- Added to NRHP: December 05, 1984
- Removed from NRHP: June 11, 2015

Conerly House is located in Alexandria, Louisiana. It was added to the National Register of Historic Places on December 5, 1984. The house was relocated in 2004. It was subsequently delisted in 2015.
