= Central Louisiana State Hospital Dairy Barn =

- U.S. National Register of Historic Places
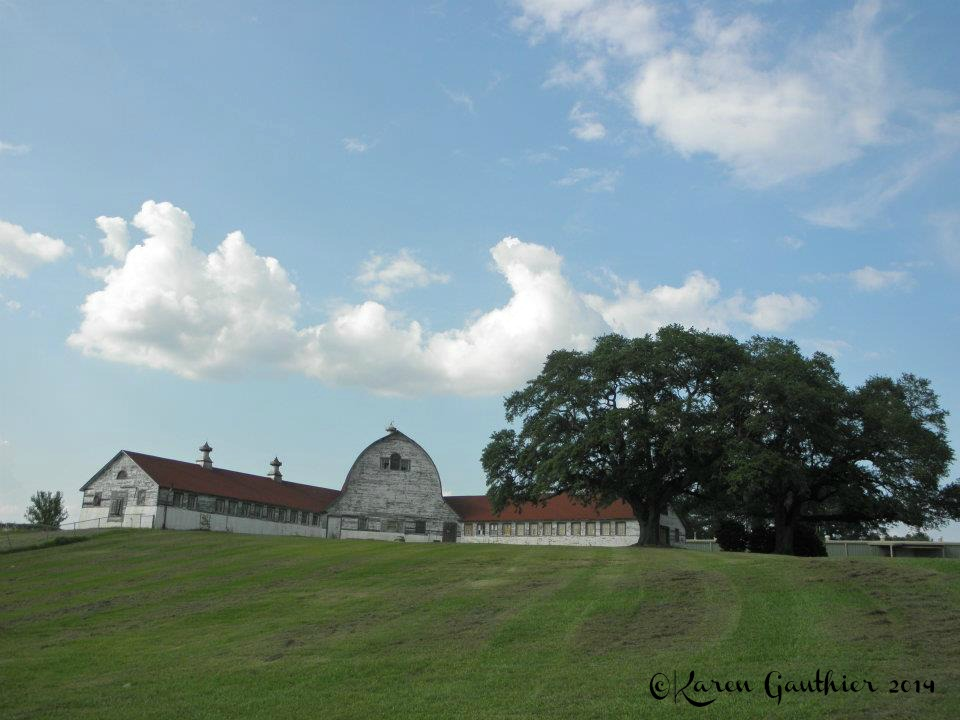

- Location within Louisiana Location within the United States
- Location: US 165, Pineville, Louisiana
- Coordinates: 31°20′1″N 92°26′27″W
- Area: 4 acres (1.6 ha)
- Built: 1923
- Architect: Carlin, Joseph H.
- NRHP reference No.: 86001078
- Added to NRHP: May 15, 1986

The Central Louisiana State Hospital Dairy Barn is located in Pineville, Louisiana. It was added to the National Register of Historic Places on May 15, 1986.

Its National Register nomination describes it:

The Central Louisiana State Hospital Dairy Barn is of statewide significance in the area of architecture as a very unusual example of a farm outbuilding. The barn was designed by an architect, which makes it most unusual among surviving old barns in Louisiana. Its essential style is taken from midwestern dairy barns of the early twentieth century, but there are differences. Chief among them is the curvilinear gambrel roof, a feature both difficult to build and functionally unnecessary. Secondly, there are the egregiously oversized vent stacks. Finally, there is the Serlian motif attic vent. In many ways the design is a caricature rather than an example of the classic midwestern barn. It stands out among the vast stock of early twentieth century farm outbuildings in Louisiana because it was styled for visual effect. Unlike virtually all other examples in the state, its design was not wholly functional, and it did not represent the cheapest, most expeditious solution to the problem of providing for a barn. Rather, it represented an architectural folly built for dramatic picturesque effect. The State Historic Preservation Office is not aware of any comparable "outbuilding" in Louisiana.
