= Britt Place =

Historic house in Louisiana, United States

- U.S. National Register of Historic Places
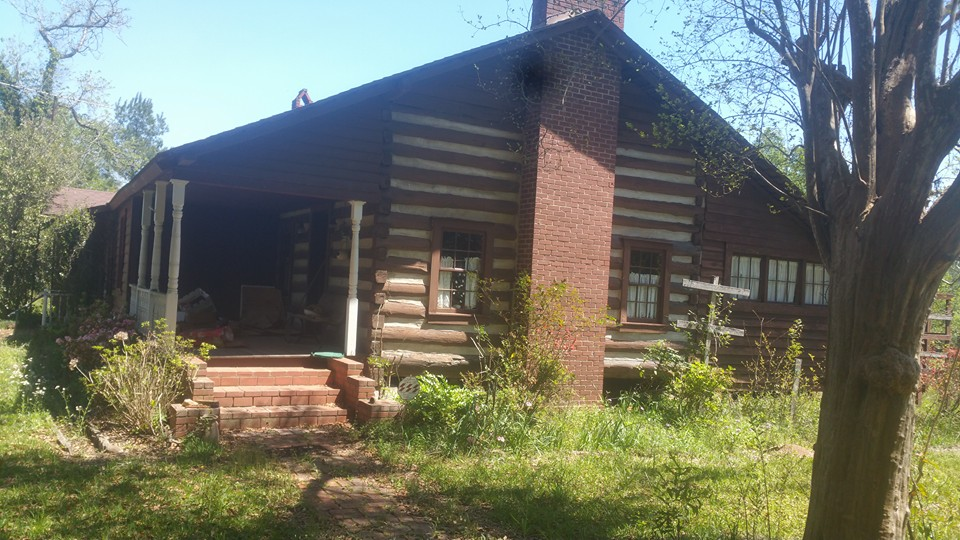

- Location within Louisiana Location within the United States
- Nearest city: Glenmora, Louisiana
- Coordinates: 30°58′5″N 92°33′47″W
- Area: 0.5 acres (0.20 ha)
- Built: 1867
- Built by: Webster Van Buren Britt
- Architectural style: Log cabin
- NRHP reference No.: 80001756
- Added to NRHP: November 21, 1980

The Britt Place, a log cabin located in Glenmora, Louisiana, United States, was built in 1867. It was added to the National Register of Historic Places in 1980.

The house was started as a one-room cabin in 1867, built of half-round logs with notching. The walls have since been chinked with gray plaster. It was expanded with four small frame rooms in 1868. It was updated in the 1920s and expanded with four more rooms in the 1940s, creating an "L"-shape.

In 1980 the house was deemed "significant in the area of exploration and settlement because it embodies the beginnings of settlement in the vicinity of present-day Glenmora. The home was begun in 1867 by Webster VanBuren Britt, the first man to permanently settle in the area. It is presently owned and lived in by his granddaughter, Frances Britt Irvine. The Old Britt Place is by far the oldest structure in the vicinity and is an important local tie with the past. Moreover, the house still conveys a sense of pioneer beginnings with its log walls, small rooms and low ceilings."
