= China Grove (Gardner, Louisiana) =

Historic house in Louisiana, United States

- U.S. National Register of Historic Places
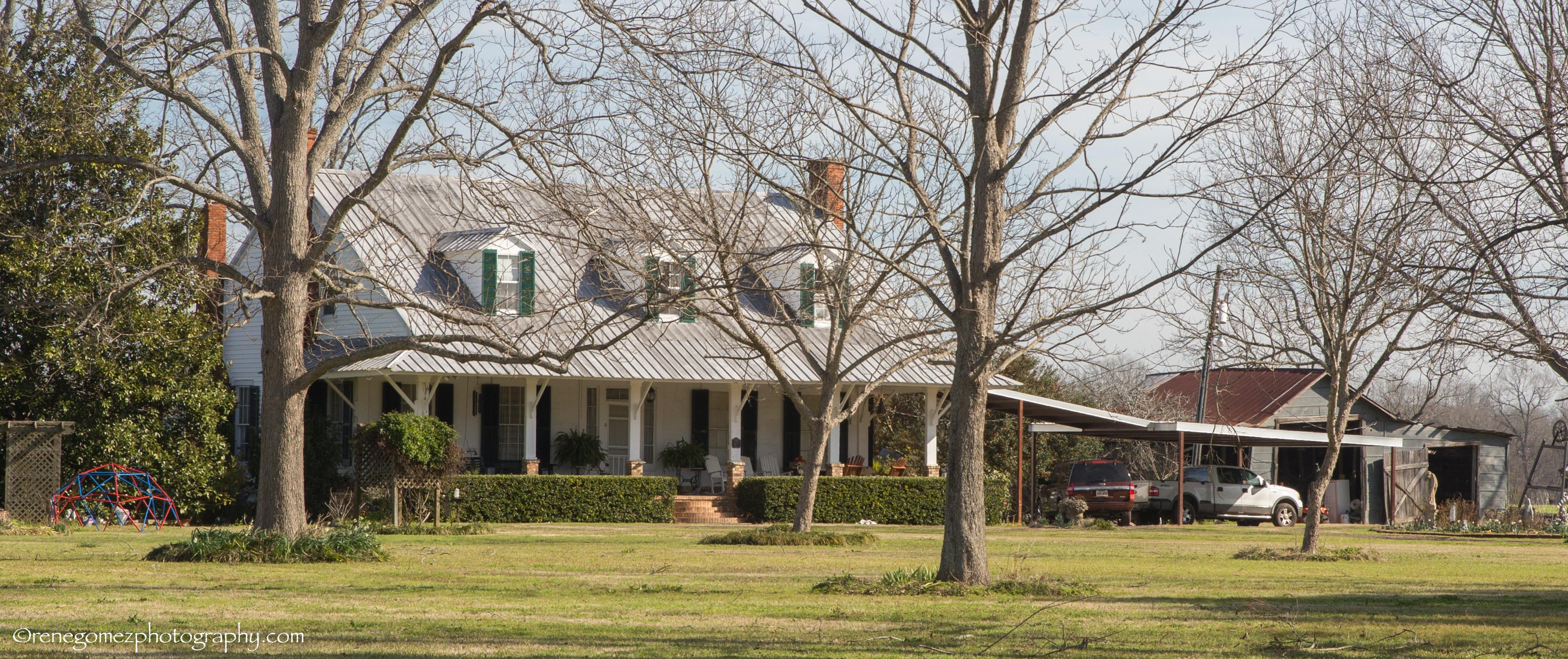

- Location within Louisiana Location within the United States
- Nearest city: Gardner, Louisiana
- Coordinates: 31°18′48″N 92°38′6″W
- Area: 1.5 acres (0.61 ha)
- Built: 1857
- Architectural style: Greek Revival
- MPS: Neo-Classical Architecture of Bayou Rapides TR
- NRHP reference No.: 84000553
- Added to NRHP: December 05, 1984

China Grove is a historic house located in Gardner, Louisiana. It was added to the National Register of Historic Places on December 5, 1984. The house is considered to be an outstanding example of neo-classical and Greek Revival architecture; its Greek Revival woodwork in particular stands out among houses in the region.

It was listed as one result of a study of 10 Neo-Classical farm-plantation houses along Bayou Rapides. As for several of the others (Eden, Geneva, Hope, Island Home, Longview), China Grove was modified by addition of hood along its original gallery, termed a false gallery, which provides additional protection from the rain, detracting somewhat but not greatly from its original appearance.
