= Norman F. Carnahan =

American chemical engineer

Norman F. Carnahan (born February 27, 1942, in New Iberia, Louisiana) is an American chemical engineer, a fellow of The American Institute of Chemical Engineers. He is the Founding Chair of the Upstream Engineering and Flow Assurance (UE&FA) Forum of AIChE. From 2011 to 2019, he was the AIChE member on the board of directors of The Offshore Technology Conference.

== Education ==
His education in science and mathematics began at St. Pius X High School in Houston, Texas, and continued with engineering and science studies at the University of Houston, where he earned a Bachelor of Science degree in chemical engineering in 1965. During his undergraduate studies, Professor H. Wm. Prengle guided him in the fundamentals of thermodynamics and equations of state. After graduation, he worked with Dow Chemical Company Research and Development, where he was mentored by Dr. Daniel R. Stull.

In 1968, Carnahan began graduate studies at the University of Oklahoma. His graduate advisor was Professor Kenneth Earl Starling. During his graduate studies, he was influenced by Professors Sherrill D. Christian, Jack Cohn and Cedomir Sliepcevich, and by correspondences with Berni Alder, Bill Hoover, E. Brian Smith and Ben Widom. Carnahan's vision of molecular interactions and fluid behavior was strongly influenced by the works of Johannes Diderik van der Waals and by René Descartes.

== Career ==
His interest in statistical mechanics, physics of fluids, molecular phenomena and fundamentals of equations of state led to the development of the Carnahan-Starling equation of state (1969) for the fluid phase of rigid non-attracting spheres, as single components and mixtures (Mansoori-Carnahan-Starling-Leland, 1971)

                   
  
    
      
        P
        V
        
          /
        
        N
        k
        T
        =
        (
        1
        +
        y
        +
        
          y
          
            2
          
        
        −
        
          y
          
            3
          
        
        )
        
          /
        
        (
        1
        −
        y
        
          )
          
            3
          
        
      
    
    {\displaystyle PV/NkT=(1+y+y^{2}-y^{3})/(1-y)^{3}}
  

After completion of his doctoral studies at University of Oklahoma, in 1971, he began a long research and teaching association with Professors Riki Kobayashi and Thomas W. Leland Jr., at Rice University in Houston, Texas.

In the 1980s, he resumed work on extending the Carnahan-Starling equation of state to systems of rigid non-attracting non-spherical particles. Together with Professor Erich A. Muller, a series of papers were published in which a shape factor concept was incorporated to enable the equation developed for rigid sphere fluids to be extended to describe the fluid phase of many rigid nonattracting nonspherical particles.
