= Kolin, Louisiana =

Kolin
- Unincorporated community
- Location of Kolin in Louisiana
- Coordinates: 31°16′37″N 92°18′53″W
- Country: United States
- State: Louisiana
- Parish: Rapides
- Time zone: UTC-6 (CST)
  - Summer (DST): UTC-5 (CDT)
- Area code: 318

Kolin is an unincorporated community in Rapides Parish, Louisiana United States and is part of the Alexandria metropolitan area, Louisiana. Along with the nearby community of Libuse, it was founded in 1914 by Czech immigrants, and named after Kolín, Czech Republic.

== Geography ==
Kolin is located at 31°16′37″N 92°18′53″W.
