= Carnahan House =

Historic house in Louisiana, United States

- U.S. National Register of Historic Places
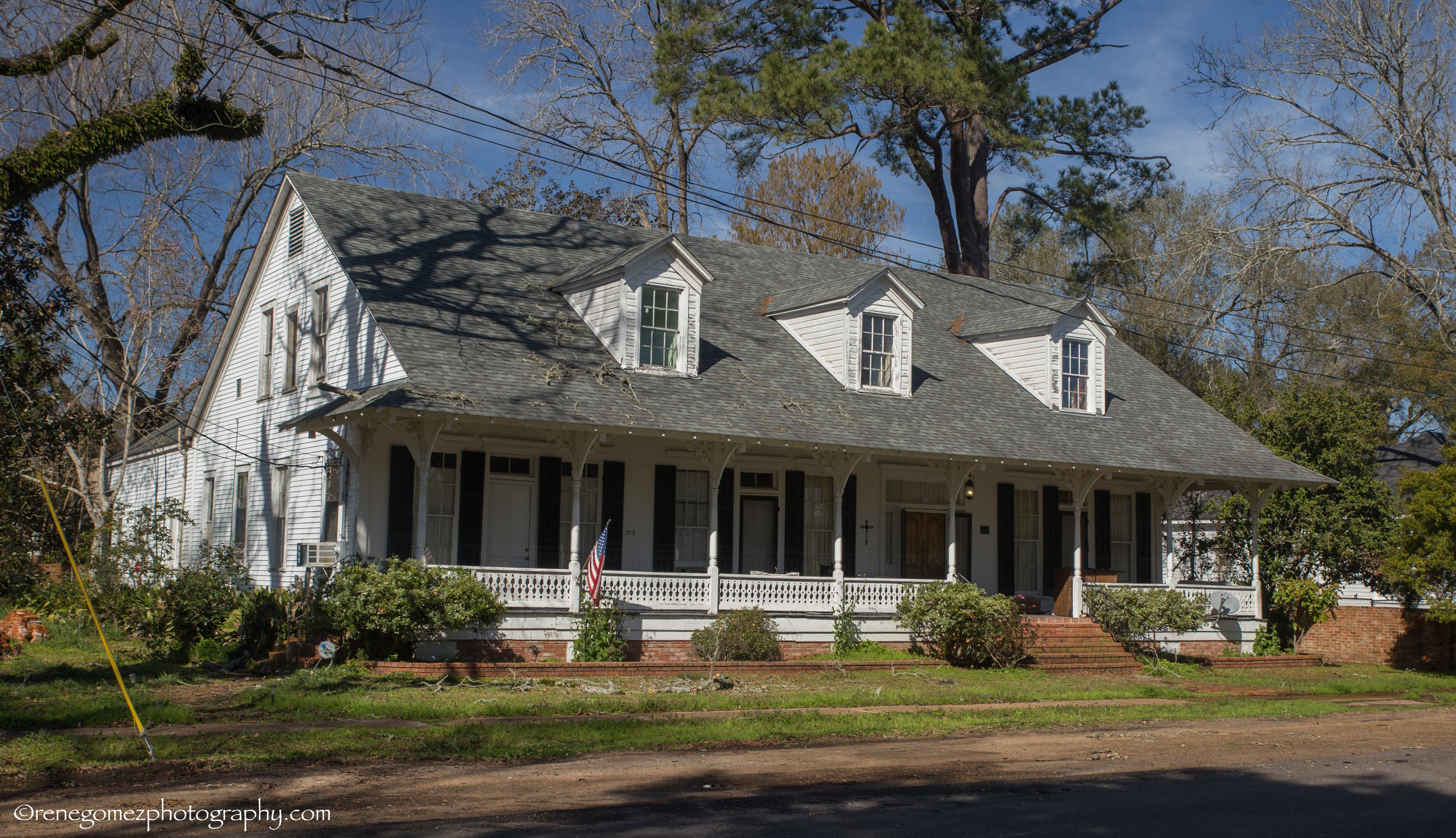

- Location within Louisiana Location within the United States
- Location: 212 Ulster Ave., Boyce, Louisiana
- Coordinates: 31°23′29″N 92°40′8″W
- Area: less than one acre
- Built: 1880
- Architectural style: Stick/Eastlake, Italianate
- NRHP reference No.: 95000373
- Added to NRHP: April 7, 1995

The Carnahan House, in Boyce, Louisiana, was built around 1880 and was added to the National Register of Historic Places in 1995.

It is a one-and-a-half-story frame galleried cottage built in a transitional Greek Revival/Italianate style. It was remodeled around 1900 by the addition of an Eastlake-style gallery.

It is located near the Red River levee.
