= Meeker Sugar Refinery =

- U.S. National Register of Historic Places
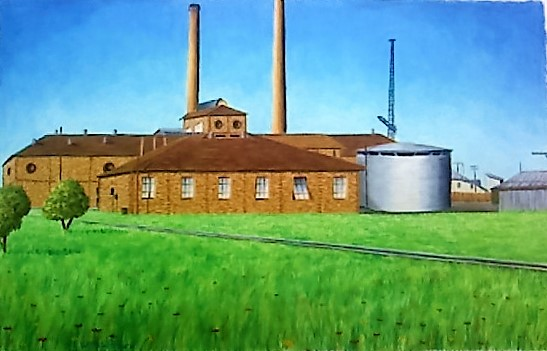
- Painting of buildings.

- Location within Louisiana Location within the United States
- Location: Meeker, Louisiana
- Coordinates: 31°3′30″N 92°22′43″W
- Area: 21 acres (8.5 ha)
- Built: 1912
- Architect: Meeker Sugar Refinery Co., Inc.
- NRHP reference No.: 87002023
- Added to NRHP: November 16, 1987

Meeker Sugar Refinery is a former sugar refinery located in Meeker, Louisiana. The refinery was added to the National Register of Historic Places on November 16, 1987.

It was operated by the Klock brothers, Ernest Lorne Klock (1879–1967) and Neil Haven Klock (1896–1978), the latter of whom who served from 1940 to 1944 in the Louisiana House of Representatives as one of the three Rapides Parish members.
