= Trinity Episcopal Church (Cheneyville, Louisiana) =

Historic church in Louisiana, United States

- U.S. National Register of Historic Places
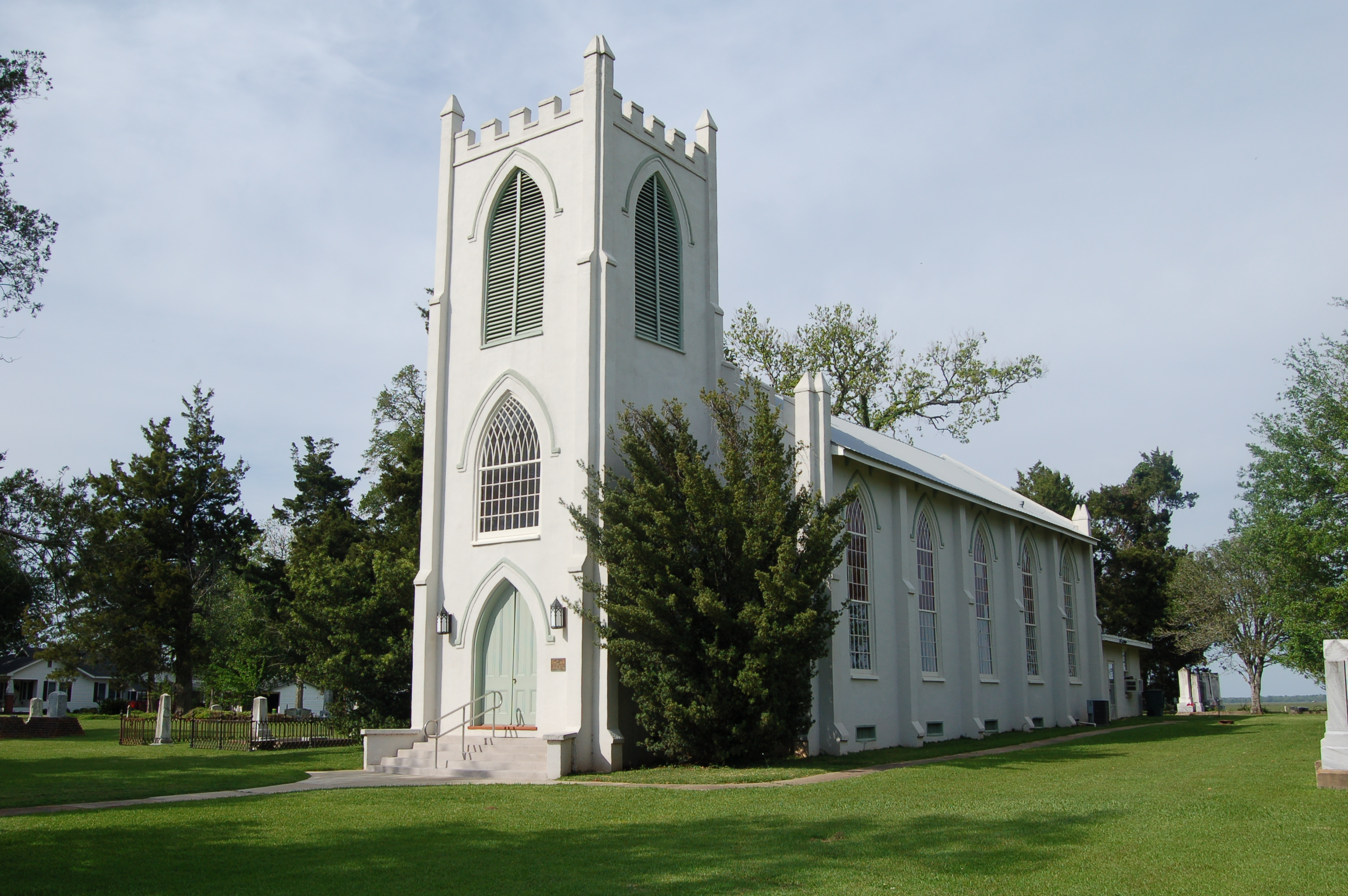
- Front and south side of church in 2005

- Location within Louisiana Location within the United States
- Nearest city: Cheneyville, Louisiana
- Coordinates: 31°1′20″N 92°17′23″W
- Area: 2 acres (0.81 ha)
- Built: 1860
- Architect: William Henry Chase
- Architectural style: Gothic Revival
- NRHP reference No.: 80001754
- Added to NRHP: 16 October 1980

Trinity Episcopal Church is located in Cheneyville, Louisiana.

== Description and history ==
The church is located in Rapides Parish on the east bank of Bayou Boeuf in a semi–rural setting. The brick building is a five bay basilica. The church is one of twelve examples of late 19th century Gothic Revival architecture buildings that remain in Louisiana. It was added to the National Register of Historic Places on October 16, 1980.
