= C.A. Schnack Jewelry Company Store =

- C.A. Schnack Jewelry Co. Store
- U.S. National Register of Historic Places
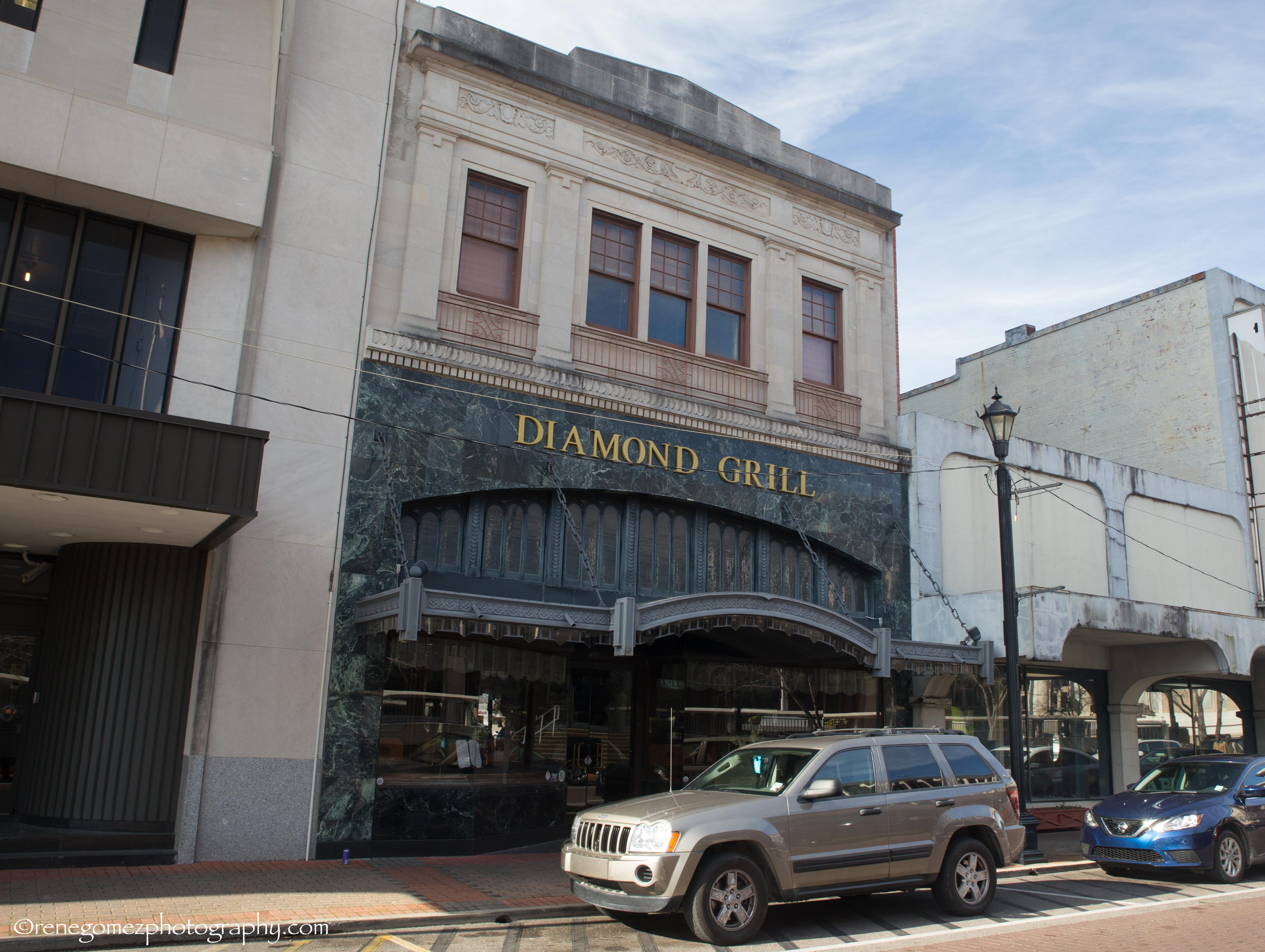

- Location within Louisiana Location within the United States
- Location: 924 Third St., Alexandria, Louisiana
- Coordinates: 31°18′40″N 92°26′42″W
- Area: less than one acre
- Built: 1931
- Built by: Tudor and Ratcliff
- Architect: Herman J. Duncan
- Architectural style: Classical Revival, Art Deco, Italian Renaissance
- NRHP reference No.: 00000684
- Added to NRHP: June 30, 2000

The C.A. Schnack Jewelry Co. Store in Alexandria, Louisiana was listed on the National Register of Historic Places in 2000.

It was designed by architect Herman J. Duncan and built by contractors Tudor and Ratcliff. It is a two-story brick party-wall commercial building with a three-story wing at the back. Its facade has "a handsome multi-arched transom, richly ornamented canopy, and intricately worked display windows."
