= Libuse, Louisiana =

Libuse
- Unincorporated community
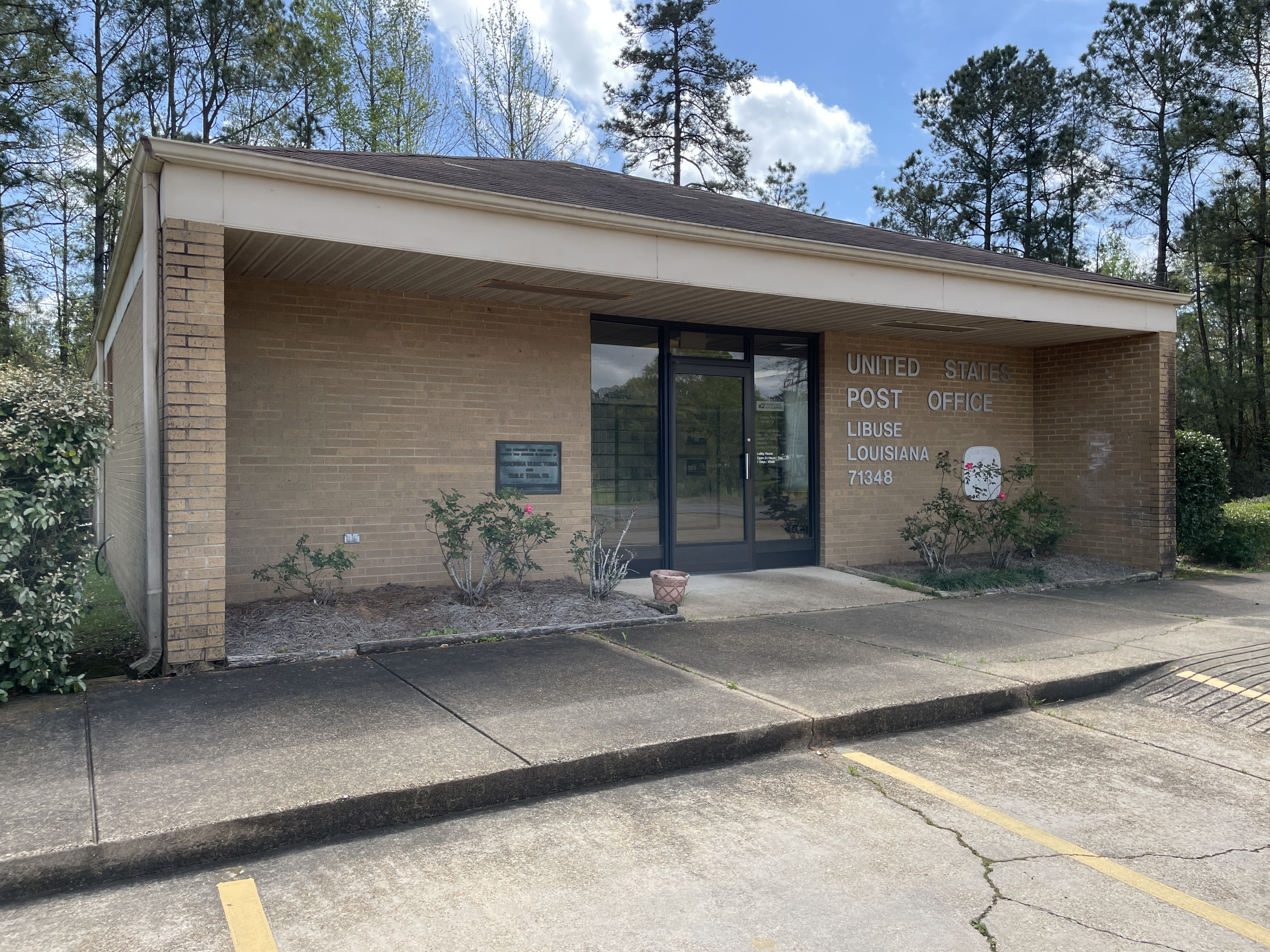
- Libuse Post Office

- Location of Libuse in Louisiana
- Coordinates: 31°21′15″N 92°20′00″W
- Country: United States
- State: Louisiana
- Parish: Rapides
- Elevation: 174 ft (53 m)

Population
  - Total: 1,965
- Time zone: UTC-6 (CST)
  - Summer (DST): UTC-5 (CDT)
- ZIP Code: 71348
- Area code: 318

Libuse is an unincorporated community in Rapides Parish, Louisiana United States and part of the Alexandria metropolitan area, Louisiana. It was founded in 1914 by Czech immigrants, and named after Libuše. As of 2011, fundraising has commenced for a future Louisiana Czech Museum to be built in Libuse. The tribal office of the Talimali Band of Apalachee is located in Libuse.

Libuse was the home of the late State Representative Carl Gunter, Jr.

== Demographics ==
At the time of the last census, Libuse's population was 1,965 with 800 total housing units. The median household income was $30,370. 50.7% of the population are male thus the other 49.3% are female. The median age of Libuse was 34. The racial makeup of the community was 233 people or 11.9% are Black or African American and 1621 people or 82.5% are White. 5.5% of the population were Hispanic or Latino of any race.

== Geography ==
Libuse is located at 31°21′15″N 92°20′00″W.
