= Gardner, Louisiana =

- Unincorporated community
- Location within Louisiana Location within the United States
- Coordinates: 31°16′11″N 92°41′35″W
- Country: United States
- State: Louisiana
- Parish: Rapides
- Elevation: 184 ft (56 m)

Population
  - Total: 1,965
- Time zone: UTC-6 (Central (CST))
  - Summer (DST): UTC-5 (CDT)
- ZIP code: 71431
- Area code: 318
- GNIS feature ID: 547386

Gardner is an unincorporated community in Rapides Parish, Louisiana, United States. Gardner is part of the Alexandria Metropolitan Statistical Area. It is located at the junction of Louisiana highways 28 and 121, 15 miles (24 km) west-southwest of Alexandria. Gardner has a population of 1,965. Gardner's post office ZIP code 71431. China Grove, a house listed on the National Register of Historic Places, is located in Gardner.

B.G. Dyess, a Southern Baptist pastor for seventy-three years and a member of the Louisiana State Senate from 1996 to 2000, was born in the Gardner Community in 1922 and is interred there at the Calvary Baptist Church Cemetery.
