= Lecompte, Louisiana =

- Town
- Town of Lecompte
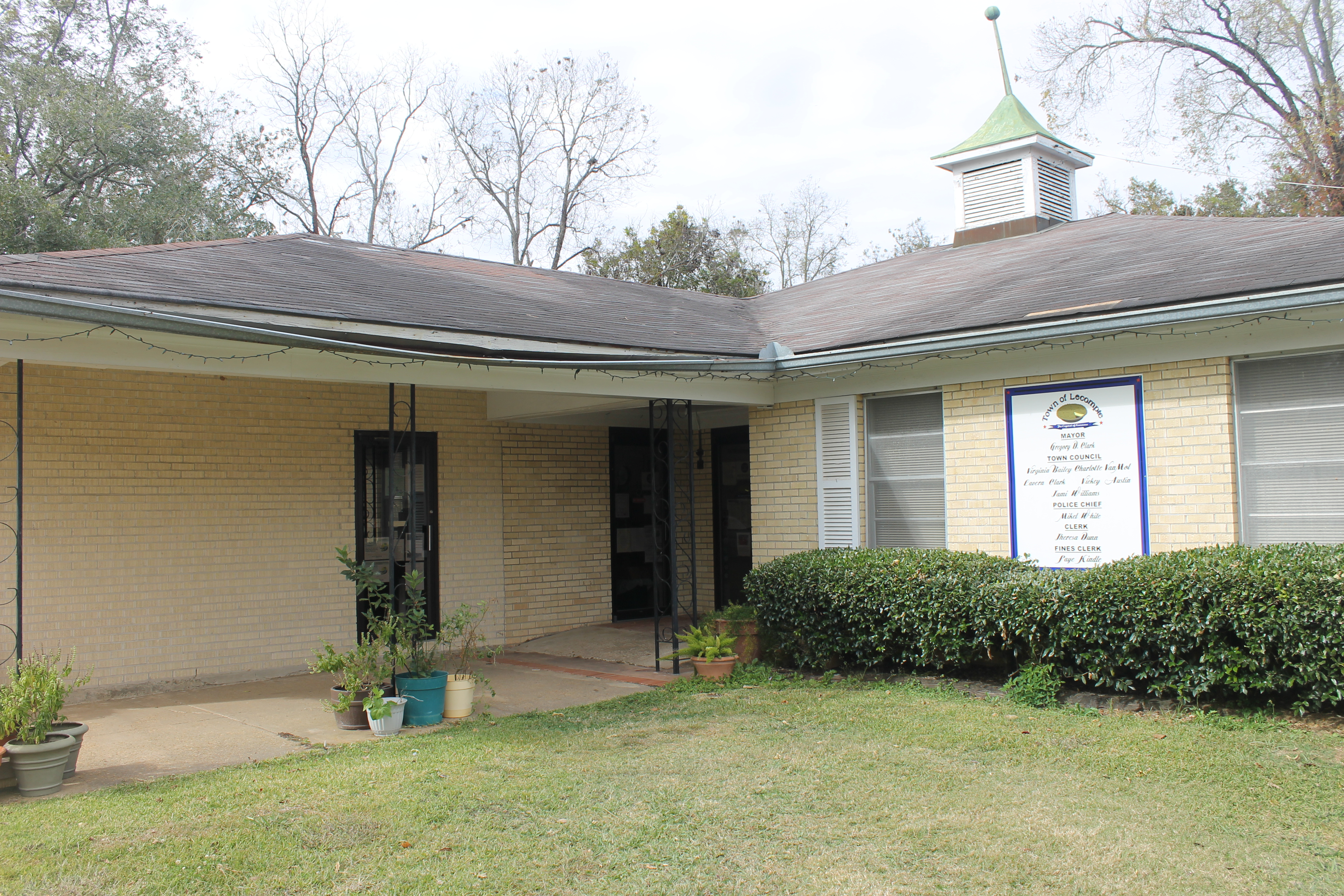
- Lecompte Town Hall

- Location of Lecompte in Rapides Parish, Louisiana.

- Location of Louisiana in the United States
- Coordinates: 31°05′16″N 92°23′30″W
- Country: United States
- State: Louisiana
- Parish: Rapides

Area
  - Total: 1.06 sq mi (2.75 km^{2})
  - Land: 1.06 sq mi (2.75 km^{2})
  - Water: 0 sq mi (0.00 km^{2})
- Elevation: 72 ft (22 m)

Population (2020)
  - Total: 845
  - Density: 794.7/sq mi (306.85/km^{2})
- Time zone: UTC-6 (CST)
  - Summer (DST): UTC-5 (CDT)
- Area code: 318
- FIPS code: 22-42800
- GNIS feature ID: 2405997

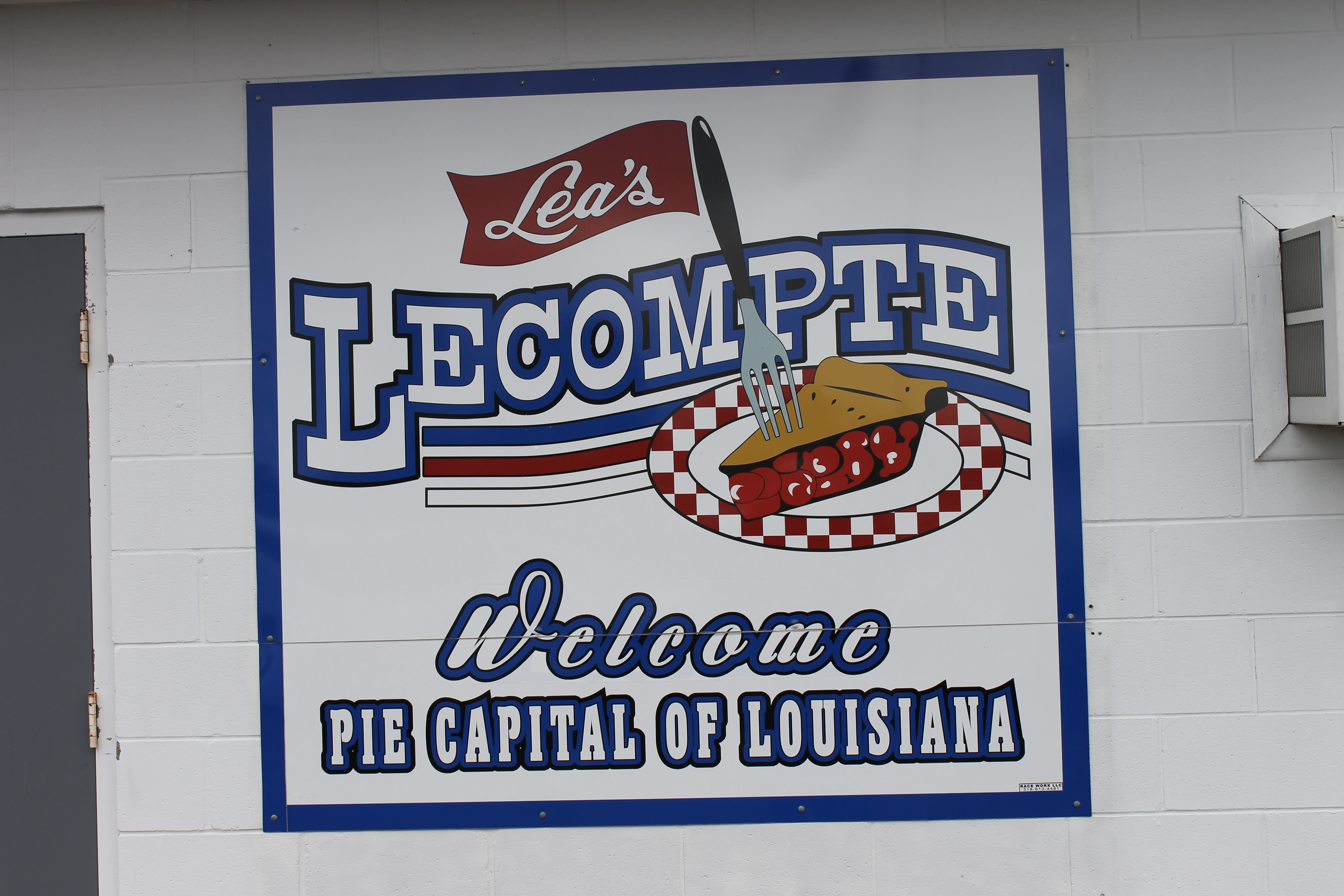
Lecompte calls itself "The Pie Capital of Louisiana".

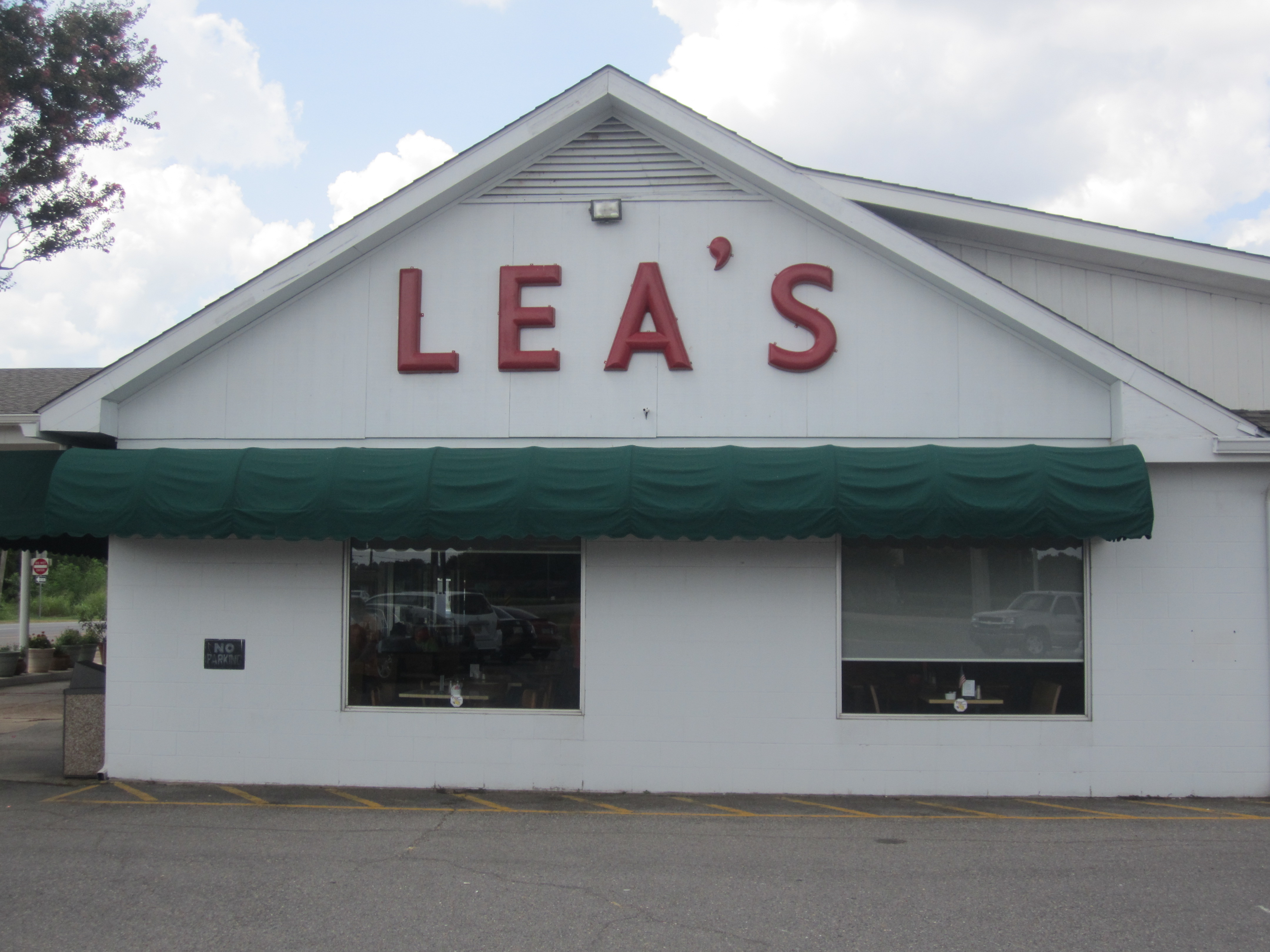
Lea's Lunchroom is a popular restaurant in Lecompte.

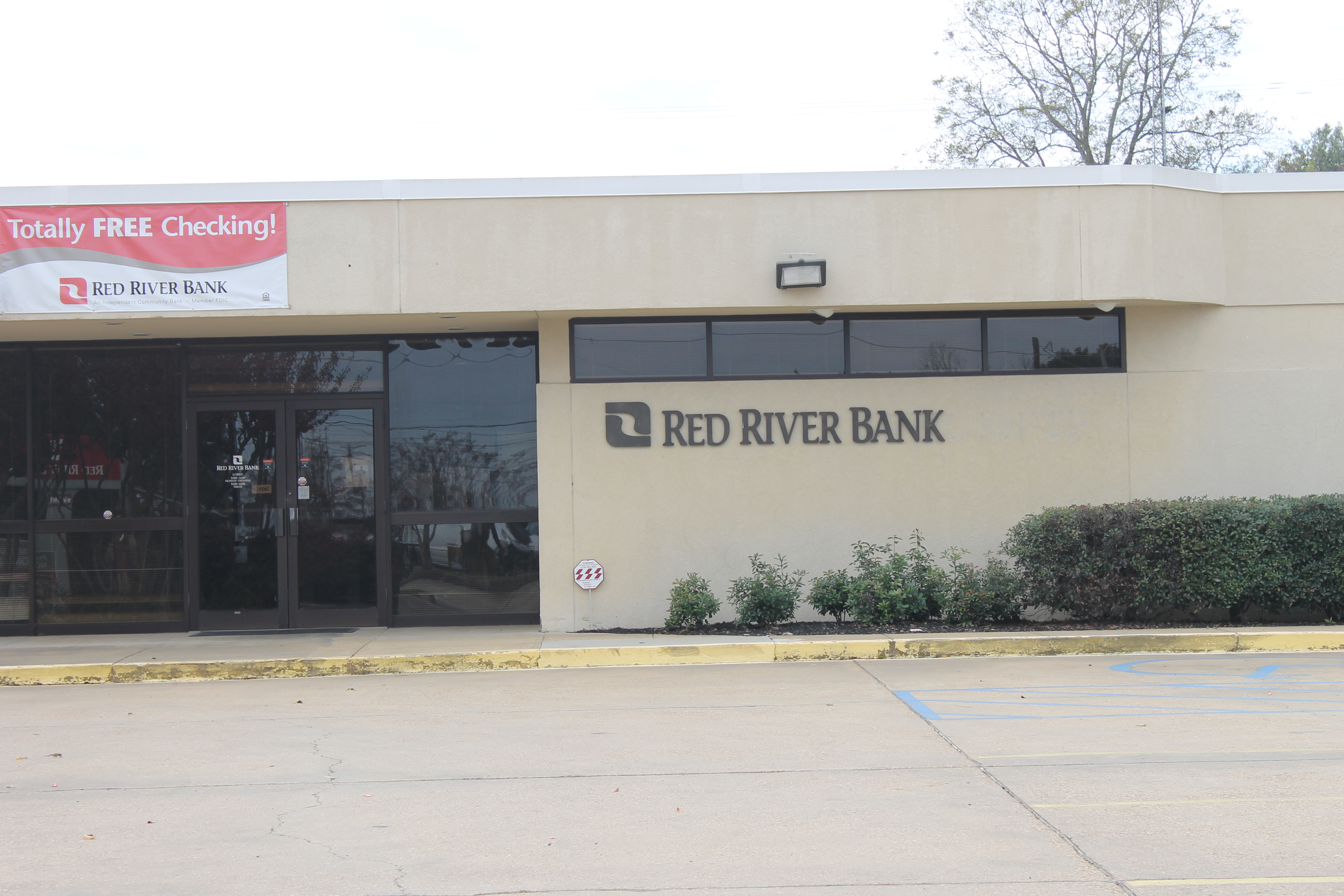
Red River Bank in Lecompte

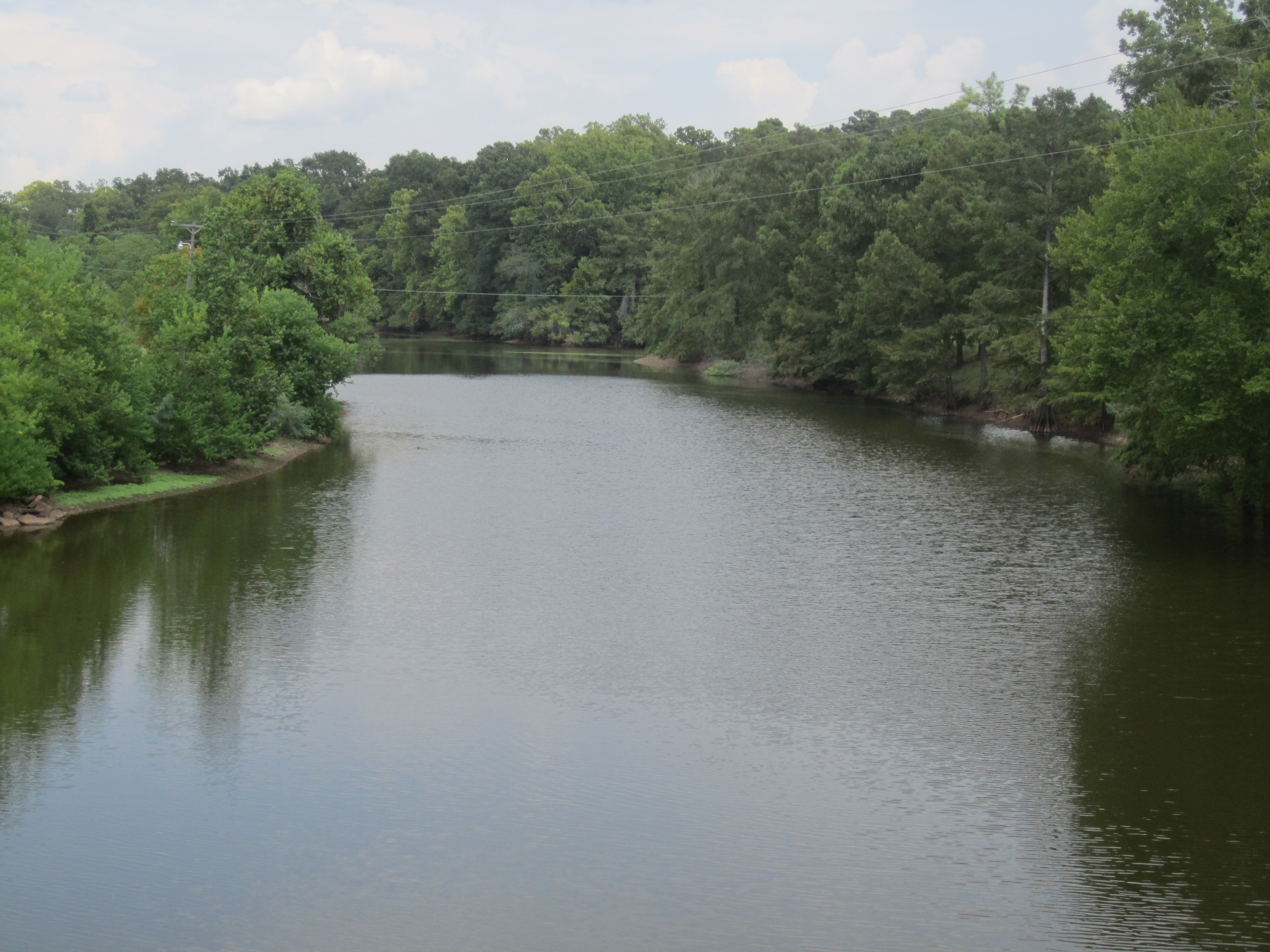
Bayou Boeuf in Lecompte

Lecompte (/ləˈkaʊnt/ lə-KOWNT) is a town in Rapides Parish, Louisiana, United States. Lecompte is situated along the banks of Bayou Boeuf in central Louisiana. US Highway 71, Louisiana’s major north-south route which connects Baton Rouge and Shreveport, runs through Lecompte. Lecompte is named after the famous race horse called LeComte, which was named after horse breeder Ambrose LeComte. It is part of the Alexandria, Louisiana metropolitan area. The population was 1,227 in the 2010 and had dropped to 845 in the 2020 Census.

== History ==
The town of Lecompte, Louisiana, was named after a famous race horse owned by the Wells family who lived on a plantation south of the town. The horse's name was LeComte. He won races at the Fair Grounds Race Course in New Orleans. During the days of the Lecompte High School, the yearbook was named The LeComte with a picture of the horse on the first page. When the railroad company painted a sign for the town on the side of the train depot, a "p" was accidentally added to the name and it has remained there ever since. The horse was named after horse breeder Ambrose LeComte who lived in the area and was a great lover of fine stock and owner of a fine string of race horses.

== Geography ==
According to the United States Census Bureau, the town has a total area of 1.0 square mile (2.6 km^{2}), all land.

=== Major highways ===
- U.S. Route 71
- U.S. Route 167
- Louisiana Highway 112
- Louisiana Highway 457

== Demographics ==
Historical population
Census	Pop.	Note	%±
1910	1,058		—
1920	1,034		−2.3%
1930	1,247		20.6%
1940	1,311		5.1%
1950	1,443		10.1%
1960	1,485		2.9%
1970	1,518		2.2%
1980	1,661		9.4%
1990	1,592		−4.2%
2000	1,366		−14.2%
2010	1,227		−10.2%
2020	845		−31.1%
2025 (est.)	822	▼	−2.7%
U.S. Decennial Census

=== 2020 census ===
Lecompte racial composition
Race	Number	Percentage
White (non-Hispanic)	232	27.46%
Black or African American (non-Hispanic)	552	65.33%
Native American	5	0.59%
Asian	2	0.24%
Other/Mixed	38	4.5%
Hispanic or Latino	16	1.89%

As of the 2020 United States census, there were 845 people, 416 households, and 236 families residing in the town.

=== 2000 census ===
As of the census of 2000, there were 1,366 people, 516 households, and 330 families residing in the town. The population density was 1,344.8 inhabitants per square mile (519.2/km^{2}). There were 586 housing units at an average density of 576.9 per square mile (222.7/km^{2}). The racial makeup of the town was 24.96% White, 74.30% African American, 0.15% Native American, 0.15% from other races, and 0.44% from two or more races. Hispanic or Latino of any race were 0.95% of the population.

There were 516 households, out of which 27.3% had children under the age of 18 living with them, 34.7% were married couples living together, 24.2% had a female householder with no husband present, and 35.9% were non-families. 32.2% of all households were made up of individuals, and 16.9% had someone living alone who was 65 years of age or older. The average household size was 2.65 and the average family size was 3.38.

In the town, the population was spread out, with 28.9% under the age of 18, 10.9% from 18 to 24, 24.2% from 25 to 44, 20.6% from 45 to 64, and 15.4% who were 65 years of age or older. The median age was 34 years. For every 100 females, there were 79.0 males. For every 100 females age 18 and over, there were 75.0 males.

The median income for a household in the town was $18,708, and the median income for a family was $23,897. Males had a median income of $22,361 versus $15,250 for females. The per capita income for the town was $10,210. About 32.9% of families and 35.4% of the population were below the poverty line, including 42.8% of those under age 18 and 32.6% of those age 65 or over.

== Notable people ==
- Jackson B. Davis, attorney who served in the Louisiana State Senate from 1956 to 1980
- Clyde C. Holloway, The late Louisiana Public Service Commissioner was born in Lecompte in 1943.

== See also ==
- James Madison Wells, 20th Governor of Louisiana
