= National Register of Historic Places listings in Catahoula Parish, Louisiana =

Location of Catahoula Parish in Louisiana

This is a list of the National Register of Historic Places listings in Catahoula Parish, Louisiana.

This is intended to be a complete list of the properties on the National Register of Historic Places in Catahoula Parish, Louisiana, United States. The locations of National Register properties for which the latitude and longitude coordinates are included below, may be seen in a map.

There are 14 properties listed on the National Register in the parish.

This National Park Service list is complete through NPS recent listings posted December 12, 2025.

== Current listings ==
	Name on the Register	Image	Date listed	Location	City or town	Description
1	Battleground Plantation	Battleground Plantation	May 14, 1979 (#79001056)	About 1 mile (1.6 km) southeast of LA 15 and about 3.2 miles (5.1 km) north of Sicily Island; 31°53′33″N 91°38′46″W	Sicily Island vicinity	
2	Caney Mounds		September 6, 2005 (#05000986)	Address restricted	Jonesville	
3	Catahoula Parish Courthouse	Catahoula Parish Courthouse	October 27, 1988 (#88002056)	301 Bushley Street (LA 124); 31°46′18″N 91°49′17″W	Harrisonburg	
4	Ferry Place	Ferry Place	August 29, 1980 (#80001711)	Address restricted	Sicily Island	
5	Green-Lovelace House	Green-Lovelace House	April 5, 1983 (#83000495)	About 300 yards (270 m) east of LA 15 and about 2 miles (3.2 km) north of Sicily Island; 31°52′30″N 91°39′35″W	Sicily Island vicinity	
6	Hardin House	Hardin House	November 8, 1990 (#90001740)	Along LA 913, about 900 yards (820 m) north of its junction with LA 8; 31°50′06″N 91°43′07″W	Sicily Island	Also known as Harts' Crossing.
7	Harrisonburg Methodist Church	Harrisonburg Methodist Church	June 15, 2015 (#15000345)	105 Pine Street; 31°46′15″N 91°49′16″W	Harrisonburg	
8	Kirby House	Kirby House	January 21, 1988 (#87002498)	Corner of Trinity Road and Trinity Road B 31°37′54″N 91°48′44″W	Trinity	
9	Marengo Plantation House	Marengo Plantation House	December 14, 1987 (#87002135)	North of US 84, about 6.5 miles (10.5 km) west of Jonesville; 31°35′30″N 91°55′21″W	Jonesville vicinity	
10	Moss Grove Plantation House	Moss Grove Plantation House	September 6, 2006 (#06000779)	509 Black River Road; 31°32′50″N 91°48′08″W	Jonesville	
11	Paul's Camp South		May 26, 2004 (#04000529)	Address restricted	Jonesville	
12	Sargent House	Sargent House	December 3, 1980 (#80001710)	103 Catahoula Street; 31°46′20″N 91°49′11″W	Harrisonburg	
13	Spring Ridge Baptist Church	Spring Ridge Baptist Church	October 7, 1993 (#93001037)	Along Springridge Road, about 6.5 miles (10.5 km) southwest of Enterprise and about 4 miles (6.4 km) north of Aimwell; 31°50′02″N 91°57′57″W	Aimwell	
14	Wildwood	Wildwood	October 30, 1989 (#89001874)	On the levee of Tensas River, about 0.75 miles (1.21 km) east of LA 15 and about 5.3 miles (8.5 km) southeast of Sicily Island; 31°48′43″N 91°34′34″W	Sicily Island	

== See also ==
- List of National Historic Landmarks in Louisiana
- National Register of Historic Places listings in Louisiana
