= Moss Grove Plantation House =

Historic plantation house in Louisiana

- U.S. National Register of Historic Places
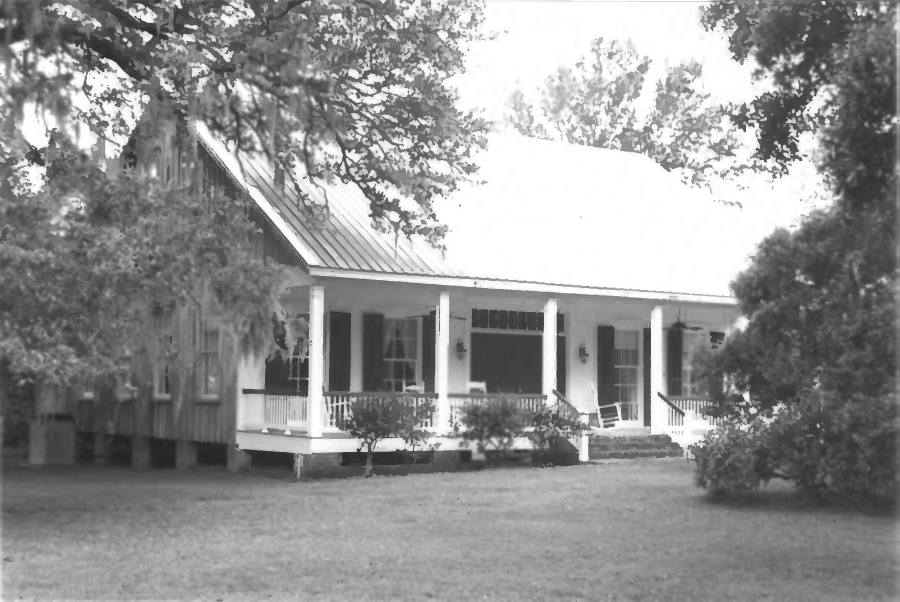

- Location within Louisiana Location within the United States
- Location: 509 Black River Road, Jonesville, Louisiana 71343
- Coordinates: 31°32′50″N 91°48′08″W
- Built: 1870
- Architectural style: Greek Revival, Central hall plan, Dogtrot house
- NRHP reference No.: 06000779
- Added to NRHP: September 6, 2006

The Moss Grove Plantation House is a historic plantation house on the west bank of the Black River in unincorporated Catahoula Parish, Louisiana near Jonesville, Louisiana. It was built around 1870 and added to the National Register of Historic Places in 2006.

== History ==
Samuel and Caroline Cotton Wilmoth established the cotton plantation in 1836. During the Civil War, the original house was attacked by American gunboats and the current house was built after the war. In the 1970s, a levee was built behind the house instead of in front at the owners' request to avoid needing to relocate the structure away from the river.

== Architecture ==
The house is designed with the Greek Revival architecture style more common with earlier Antebellum houses. The front has columns on the facade while the inside has a central hall plan. If both the paneled folding doors are opened, it has a dogtrot layout.

== See also ==
- List of plantations in Louisiana
- National Register of Historic Places listings in Catahoula Parish, Louisiana
