= Green-Lovelace House =

Historic house in Louisiana, United States

- U.S. National Register of Historic Places
- Location within Louisiana Location within the United States
- Location: About 300 yards (270 m) east of LA 15 and about 2 miles (3.2 km) north of Sicily Island
- Nearest city: Sicily Island, Louisiana
- Coordinates: 31°52′30″N 91°39′35″W
- Area: 0.2 acres (0.081 ha)
- Built: c.1830
- Architectural style: Greek Revival, Central hallway
- NRHP reference No.: 83000495
- Added to NRHP: April 5, 1983

The Green-Lovelace House, located about 2 miles (3.2 km) north of the town of Sicily Island in Catahoula Parish, Louisiana, is a historic house which was built in about 1830. It was listed on the National Register of Historic Places in 1983.

It has elements of Greek Revival style with a central hallway.

It was one of just three Greek Revival-styled plantation houses surviving in the parish in 1983, out of what was probably about 40 at the time of the American Civil War.

== See also ==
- National Register of Historic Places listings in Catahoula Parish, Louisiana
- Battleground Plantation, another Greek Revival plantation house in the parish, about two miles north
