= Peck Mounds =

Archaeological site

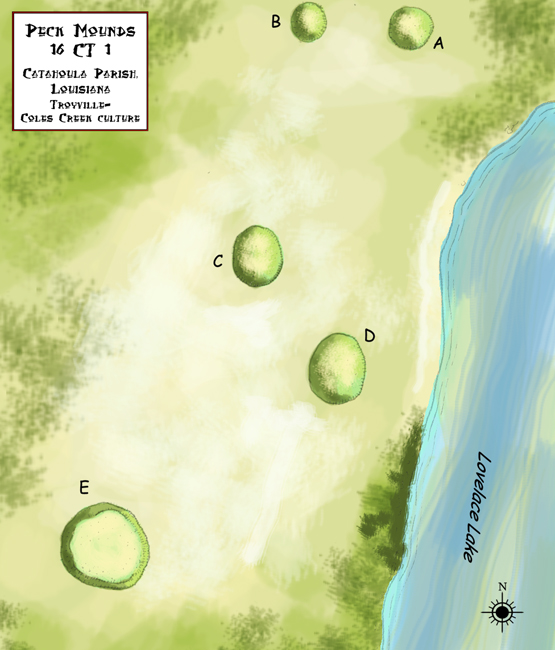
- Arrangement of the mounds at the Peck site

- Location within Louisiana today
- 31°49′30.98″N 91°39′4.05″W
- Cultures: Troyville culture, Coles Creek culture
- Location: Sicily Island, Louisiana, Catahoula Parish, Louisiana, USA
- Region: Catahoula Parish, Louisiana

History
- Built: 650 CE
- Abandoned: 860

Peck Mounds (16 CT 1) is an archaeological site of the Late Troyville-Early Coles Creek culture (650 to 860 CE) in Catahoula Parish, Louisiana.

== Description ==
The earthwork mounds are located in the vicinity of the Ferry Place Plantation house. The archeological site consists of five mounds, but one is no longer visible above ground. Three of the remaining mounds are low, dome-shaped bumps measuring roughly 4 feet (1.2 m) in height, with their bases being about 100 feet (30 m) by 130 feet (40 m). Mound E, the largest and most southernmost mound, is a platform mound, measuring 18 feet (5.5 m) in height, with the base being 165 feet (50 m) by 180 feet (55 m) and a summit area measuring 65 feet (20 m) by 55 feet (17 m). The site is situated on Maçon Ridge and overlooks Lake Lovelace.

It was added to the NRHP on August 29, 1980 as part of the Ferry Place National Register District, NRIS number 80001711. James A. Ford mentioned this site in 1933, when he conducted archeological investigations at the nearby Peck Village Site. It is also located next to the lake and .75 miles (1.21 km) south of the mound site.

== See also ==
- Culture, phase, and chronological table for the Mississippi Valley
