= Catahoula National Wildlife Refuge =

National wildlife refuge in east central Louisiana, United States

- IUCN category IV (habitat/species management area)
- Location within the United States
- Location: Catahoula Parish, LaSalle Parish, Louisiana, United States
- Nearest city: Jena, Louisiana
- Coordinates: 31°33′00″N 92°02′00″W
- Area: 25,162 acres (101.83 km^{2})
- Established: 1958
- Governing body: U.S. Fish and Wildlife Service
- Website: Catahoula National Wildlife Refuge

Catahoula National Wildlife Refuge

Catahoula National Wildlife Refuge, located in east central Louisiana, United States, 12 miles (19 km) east of Jena, was established in 1958 as a wintering area for migratory waterfowl. The refuge contains 25,162 acres (101.83 km^{2}) divided into two units. The 6,671-acre (27 km^{2}) Headquarters Unit borders nine miles (14 km) of the northeast shore of Catahoula Lake, a 26,000-acre (110 km^{2}) natural wetland renowned for its large concentrations of migratory waterfowl. The 18,491-acre (74.83 km^{2}) Bushley Bayou Unit, located 8 miles (13 km) west of Jonesville, was established May 16, 2001. This acquisition was made possible through a partnership agreement between The Conservation Fund, American Electric Power, and the Fish and Wildlife Service. The habitat found at the refuge is primarily lowland hardwood forest subject to seasonal backwater flooding from the Ouachita, and Red Rivers. The refuge is located in the Mississippi Alluvial Plain, Southern Backswamps ecoregion.

== Wildlife ==
White-tailed deer, small game mammals, songbirds, raptors, waterbirds, reptiles, and amphibians are commonly seen throughout the refuge. Waterfowl are abundant during the winter. Peak waterfowl populations of 75,000 ducks have been recorded. In 1979, the Duck Lake Impoundment was created to provide 1,200 acres (4.9 km^{2}) of waterfowl habitat. Management of the impoundment is to manipulate water levels to promote the growth of aquatic and moist soil vegetation. In 2001, Catahoula NWR was designated a Globally Important Bird Area. Catahoula Lake is recognized as a Wetlands of International Importance (Ramsar site): a historic concentration area for shorebirds, waterbirds, and migrating/wintering waterfowl. Catahoula NWR also borders a portion of the Dewey Wills Wildlife Management Area. Together, these areas provide a haven for wildlife and preserve representative samples of the unique habitats originally found in the Lower Mississippi River Ecosystem.

== See also ==
- List of National Wildlife Refuges: Louisiana
