= Sargent House (Harrisonburg, Louisiana) =

Historic house in Louisiana, United States

- U.S. National Register of Historic Places
- Location within Louisiana Location within the United States
- Location: 103 Catahoula Street, Harrisonburg, Louisiana
- Coordinates: 31°46′20″N 91°49′11″W
- Area: less than one acre
- Built: 1880
- Architectural style: Greek Revival
- NRHP reference No.: 80001710
- Added to NRHP: December 3, 1980

The Sargent House, at 103 Catahoula Street in Harrisonburg in Catahoula Parish, Louisiana, was built in about 1880 with some elements of Greek Revival style. It was listed on the National Register of Historic Places in 1980.

It is a one and a half story frame raised cottage which is nine bays wide and two rooms deep. The property backs onto the Ouachita River.

It was deemed "locally significant in the area of architecture as an unusually large example of a traditional raised cottage. According to the Louisiana state-wide survey it is Harrisonburg's only example as well as the town's oldest structure."

== See also ==
- National Register of Historic Places listings in Catahoula Parish, Louisiana
