= Harrisonburg Methodist Church =

- U.S. National Register of Historic Places
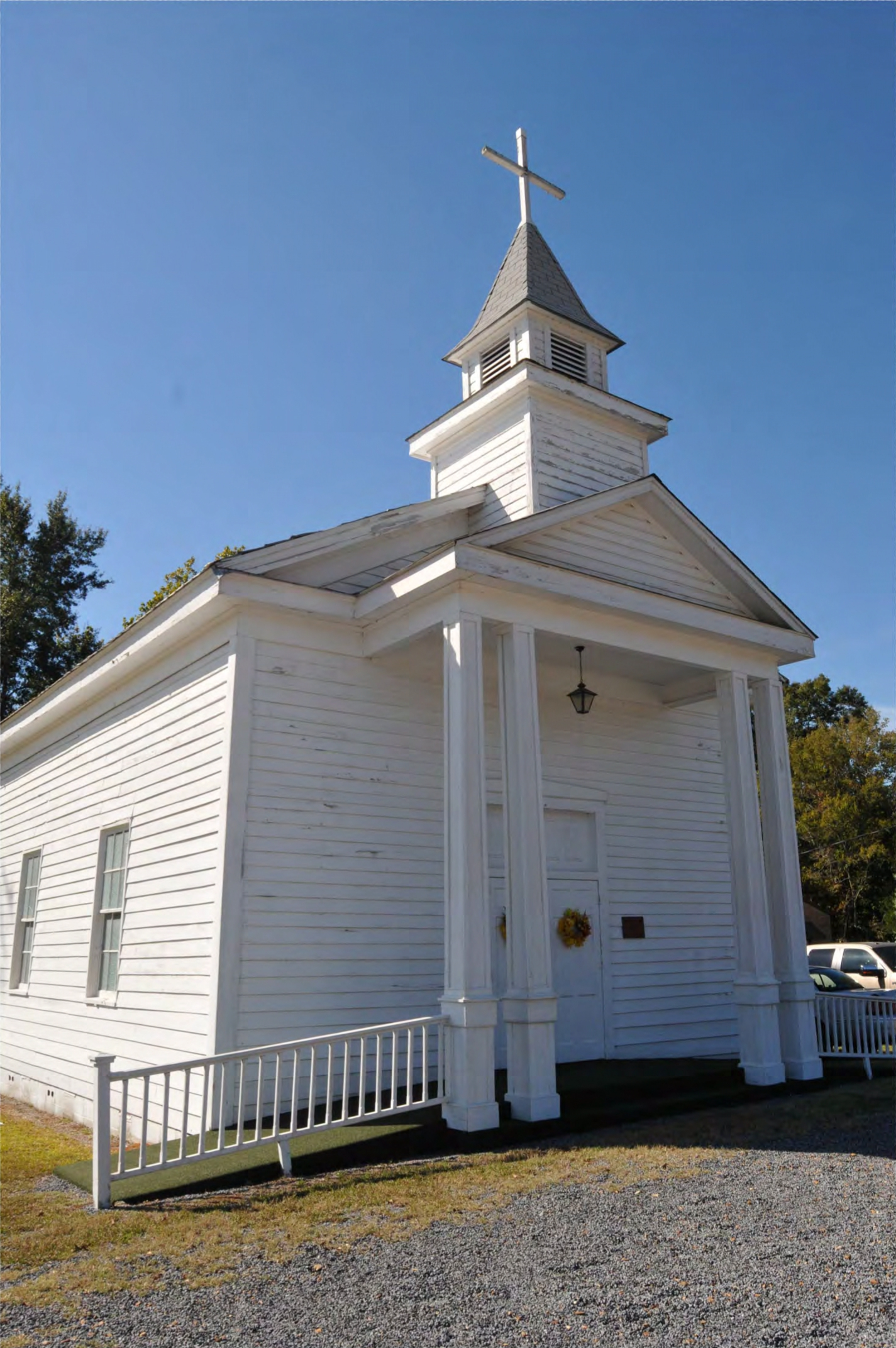

- Location within Louisiana Location within the United States
- Location: 105 Pine Street, Harrisonburg, Louisiana
- Coordinates: 31°46′15″N 91°49′16″W
- Area: Less than one acre
- Built: 1853-54
- NRHP reference No.: 15000345
- Added to NRHP: June 15, 2015

The Harrisonburg Methodist Church in Harrisonburg in Catahoula Parish, Louisiana was listed on the National Register of Historic Places in 2015.

Built in 1853–54, the church is located at 105 Pine Street, a major road through Harrisonburg, just off the east end of a bridge crossing the Ouachita River. After a flood in 1927, the church was modified in 1929 and further expanded in 1957.

It is a one-story Classical Revival-style church with a covered portico and a "witch's hat" cupola upon which a crucifix rises.

== See also ==
- Spring Ridge Baptist Church: also NRHP-listed in Catahoula Parish
- National Register of Historic Places listings in Catahoula Parish, Louisiana
