= Fort Beauregard =

- Location within Louisiana

General information
- Location: Harrisonburg, Louisiana, United States
- Coordinates: 31.77442°N 91.82074°W
- Construction started: 1862
- Completed: 1862

Technical details
- Structural system: Earthen

Fort Beauregard, located half a mile north of the village of Harrisonburg, Catahoula Parish, Louisiana, was one of four Confederate forts guarding the Ouachita River during the American Civil War. In 1863, four Union gunboats attacked it, unsuccessfully.

== Significance ==
Fort Beauregard is located on a hill overlooking the Ouachita River, several miles north of where it joins with the Tensas River and Little River to form the Black. The fort is situated on almost the only point where the upland hills of Louisiana come within artillery range of the Ouachita; thus the batteries of the fort controlled the water approach to Monroe, the only city of military importance in Northeast Louisiana. Because the Confederates concentrated here, the fort took on a greater significance: it was the key to the entire Ouachita River Valley.

== Naval attacks ==
Four Federal gunboats commanded by Commodore Selim E. Woodworth arrived on May 10, 1863. They anchored at the mouth of the Bushley, and immediately sent a flag of truce. Lieutenant William W. Fowler, representing the Federals, demanded the unconditional surrender of the fort and its surroundings. Confederate Lieut. Col. George W. Logan, commanding Fort Beauregard, reported later, "Just when we expected the boats to open fire, a yawl bearing a flag of truce was observed approaching the fort. Anticipating that its object was to demand the surrender of the fort, I deputized Captain Benton and my Adjutant, Lieutenant James G. Blanchard, to meet the yawl, with instructions, in case of such a demand, to respond that 'we would hold the fort forever.'" The flag of truce returned, and an hour afterward three of the gunboats began shelling. After firing 150 shots, the Federal shells left one Officer seriously wounded, damaged some of the parapet and destroyed one house in the town. The Confederates lost the use of important artillery pieces although two large 32 pound cannons were preserved.

Lt. Commander F. M. Ramsey's naval force of six vessels navigated passed the fort before being prevented from attacking Monroe by a falling river level. The large 32 pound cannons of the Confederates were not used due to the lack of the accompanying caissons.

== Evacuation ==
On September 4, 1863, the fort was evacuated and destroyed by fort commander Lieutenant Colonel George W. Logan in the face of a formidable expedition under the Federal generals, M.M. Crocker and Walter Q. Gresham, which marched up from opposite Natchez.

== Development ==
In recent years, the fort has been home to several re-enactments. It is also open to the public. At one time, there were plans to develop an amusement park on the site, but these plans did not develop to fruition. For a while it had several small shops that have now been bought out and moved to different locations. Plans for future re-enactments are being made.
