= Spring Ridge Baptist Church =

Historic church in Louisiana, United States

- U.S. National Register of Historic Places
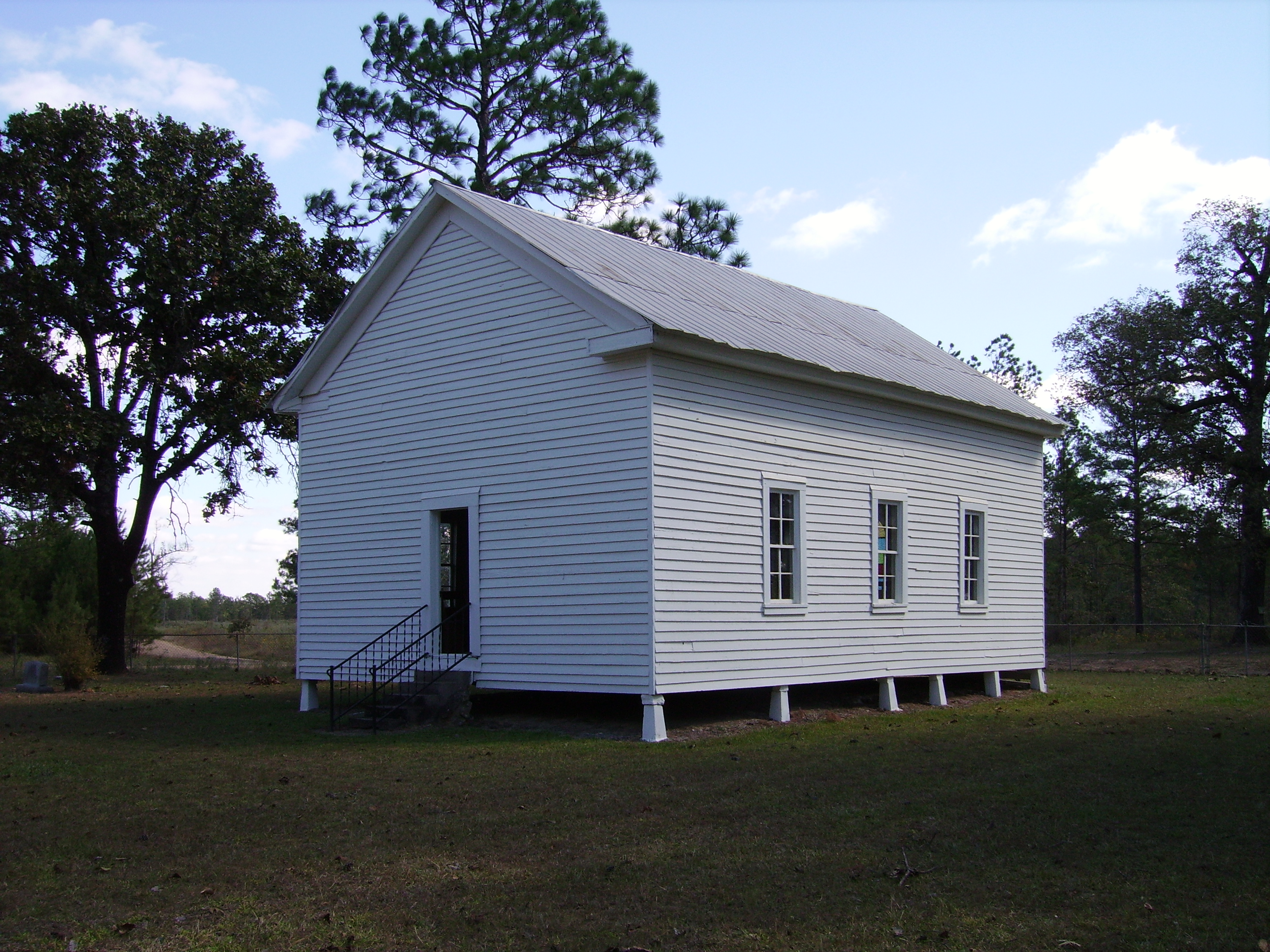

- Location within Louisiana Location within the United States
- Location: Along Springridge Road, about 6.5 miles (10.5 km) southwest of Enterprise and about 4 miles (6.4 km) north of Aimwell
- Nearest city: Aimwell, Louisiana
- Coordinates: 31°50′02″N 91°57′57″W
- Area: 2.3 acres (0.93 ha)
- Built: 1892
- NRHP reference No.: 93001037
- Added to NRHP: October 7, 1993

Spring Ridge Baptist Church is a historic Baptist church in rural Catahoula Parish, Louisiana, between the small hamlets of Enterprise and Aimwell. It is located Along Springridge Road, about 6.5 miles (10.5 km) southwest of Enterprise and about 4 miles (6.4 km) north of Aimwell. It was listed on the National Register of Historic Places in 1993.

The church was organized in 1873. The present church building is believed to have been built in 1892. It had not been used regularly as a church for about 40 years when it was added to the National Register, but it was used occasionally for homecoming services.

It was deemed significant as "a rare surviving example of an important North Louisiana building type....a well-preserved example of an austere country frame church. As such, it represents a local North Louisiana unpretentious building tradition associated with the Upland South settlement patterns of the region. From an architectural standpoint, churches of this type should be regarded as remote descendants of provincial Greek Revival temple form churches. Generally associated with the Methodist and Baptist sects, they represent an archetype which is a vital part of the Upland South building tradition."

== See also ==
- Harrisonburg Methodist Church: also NRHP-listed in Catahoula Parish
- National Register of Historic Places listings in Catahoula Parish, Louisiana
