= Battleground Plantation =

Historic house in Louisiana, United States

- U.S. National Register of Historic Places
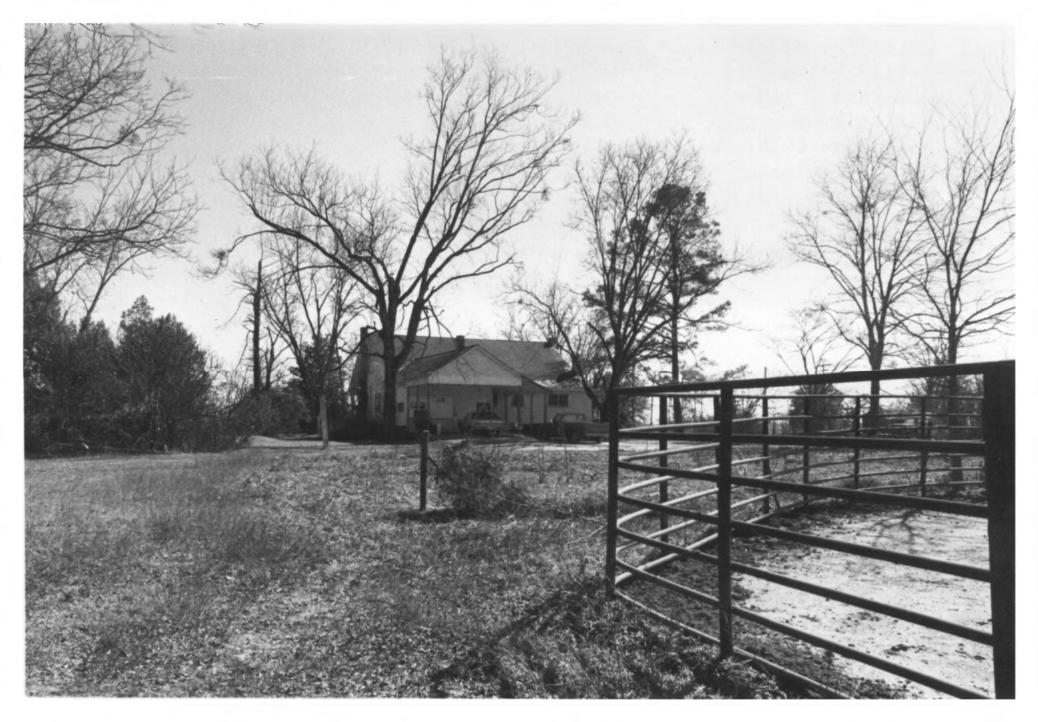

- Location within Louisiana Location within the United States
- Location: Along Ditto and Gamble Road, about 1 mile (1.6 km) southeast of LA 15 and about 3.2 miles (5.1 km) north of Sicily Island
- Nearest city: Sicily Island, Louisiana
- Coordinates: 31°53′33″N 91°38′46″W
- Built: 1829-1830, c.1850
- Built by: Dr. Henry J. Peck
- Architectural style: Greek Revival
- NRHP reference No.: 79001056
- Added to NRHP: May 14, 1979

The Battleground Plantation is a Southern cotton plantation with a historic mansion located about 3.2 miles (5.1 km) north of the town of Sicily Island in Catahoula Parish, Louisiana. It was listed on the National Register of Historic Places in 1979.

The plantation house was built in 1829-1830 and was substantially modified into Greek Revival style in about 1850. The house has a front gallery with six columns. Its interior has mantels of various styles including Renaissance Revival and Gothic Revival.

The property was deemed significant as the home of Dr. Henry J. Peck (1803-1881), as the site of the last major battle between the French and the Natchez Indians, and architecturally as "a fine example of a moderately-sized Greek Revival plantation house."

There is a related historic house, Lovelace-Peck House, on Lake Lovelace south of Sicily Island.

There was an archeological study of a Natchez Indian site at Battleground Plantation.

A 2002 guidebook mentioned that Battleground Plantation was open by appointment, and that the c.1830 house "retains much of its beautiful original woodwork".

== See also ==
- National Register of Historic Places listings in Catahoula Parish, Louisiana
- Green-Lovelace House, another Greek Revival plantation house, about two miles south
