= Marengo Plantation House (Catahoula Parish, Louisiana) =

Historic plantation house in Louisiana

- U.S. National Register of Historic Places
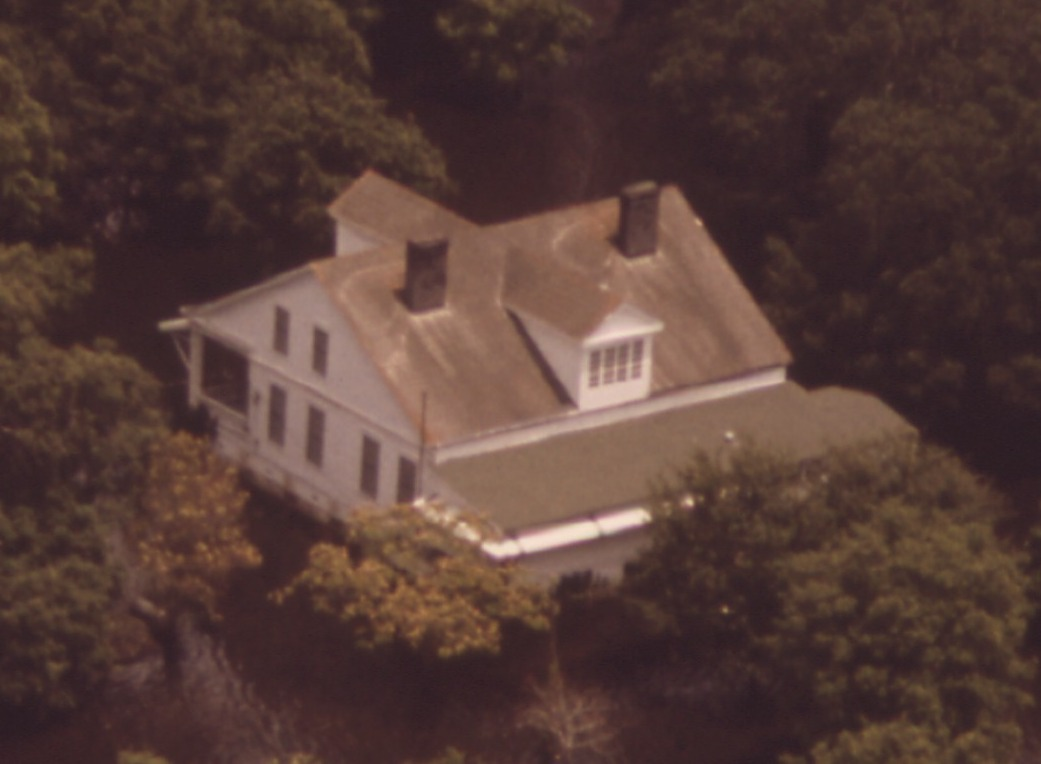
- The house in 1973

- Location within Louisiana Location within the United States
- Location: 4164 US Highway 84, Jonesville, Louisiana 71343
- Coordinates: 31°35′30″N 91°55′21″W
- Built: 1850s
- Built by: Isaac Hudson Boatner
- Architectural style: Greek Revival, Italianate
- NRHP reference No.: 87002135
- Added to NRHP: December 14, 1987

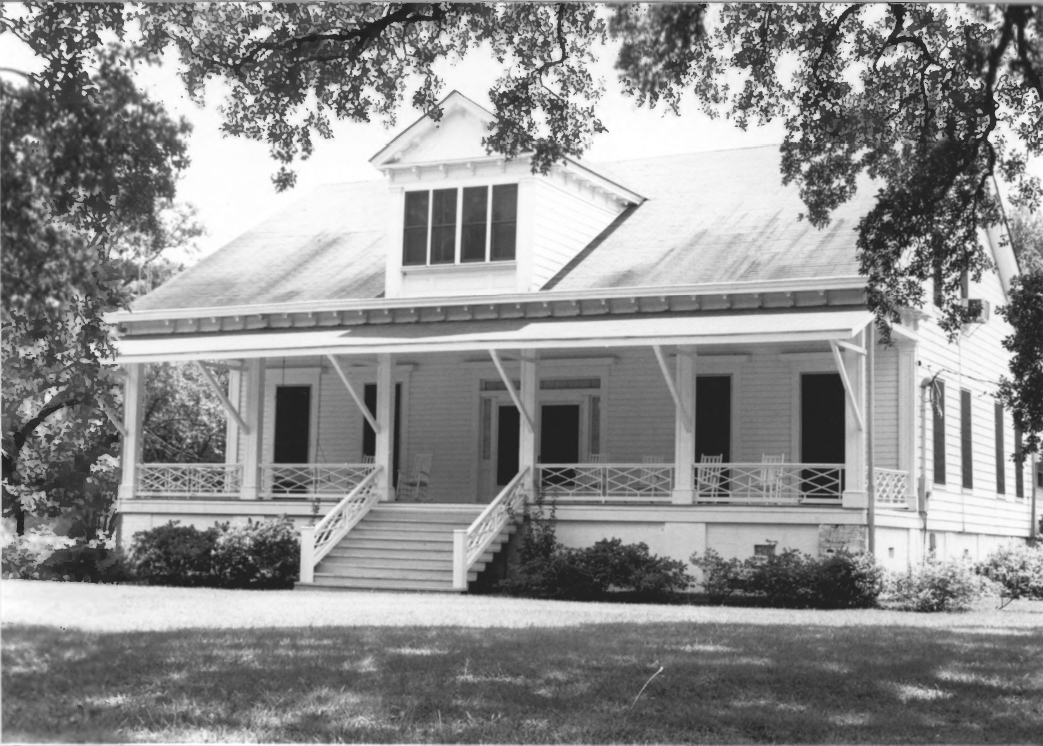
Marengo Plantation in Jonesville, Louisiana.

The Marengo Plantation House is a historic plantation house in unincorporated Catahoula Parish, Louisiana, west of Jonesville, Louisiana behind the Little River levee. The house was built in the 1850s and was listed on the National Register of Historic Places in 1987.

== History ==
In 1858, the surrounding plantation experienced a major flood.

== Architecture ==
The house is a large galleried cottage that is transitional between Greek Revival and Italianate architecture. It also blends traditional French and English floor plans.

The second story is a garret with an open room at the top of the stairs with four bedrooms. The front and back of the house both have large dormers.

== See also ==
- List of plantations in Louisiana
- National Register of Historic Places listings in Catahoula Parish, Louisiana
