= Ferry Place =

- U.S. National Register of Historic Places
- U.S. Historic district
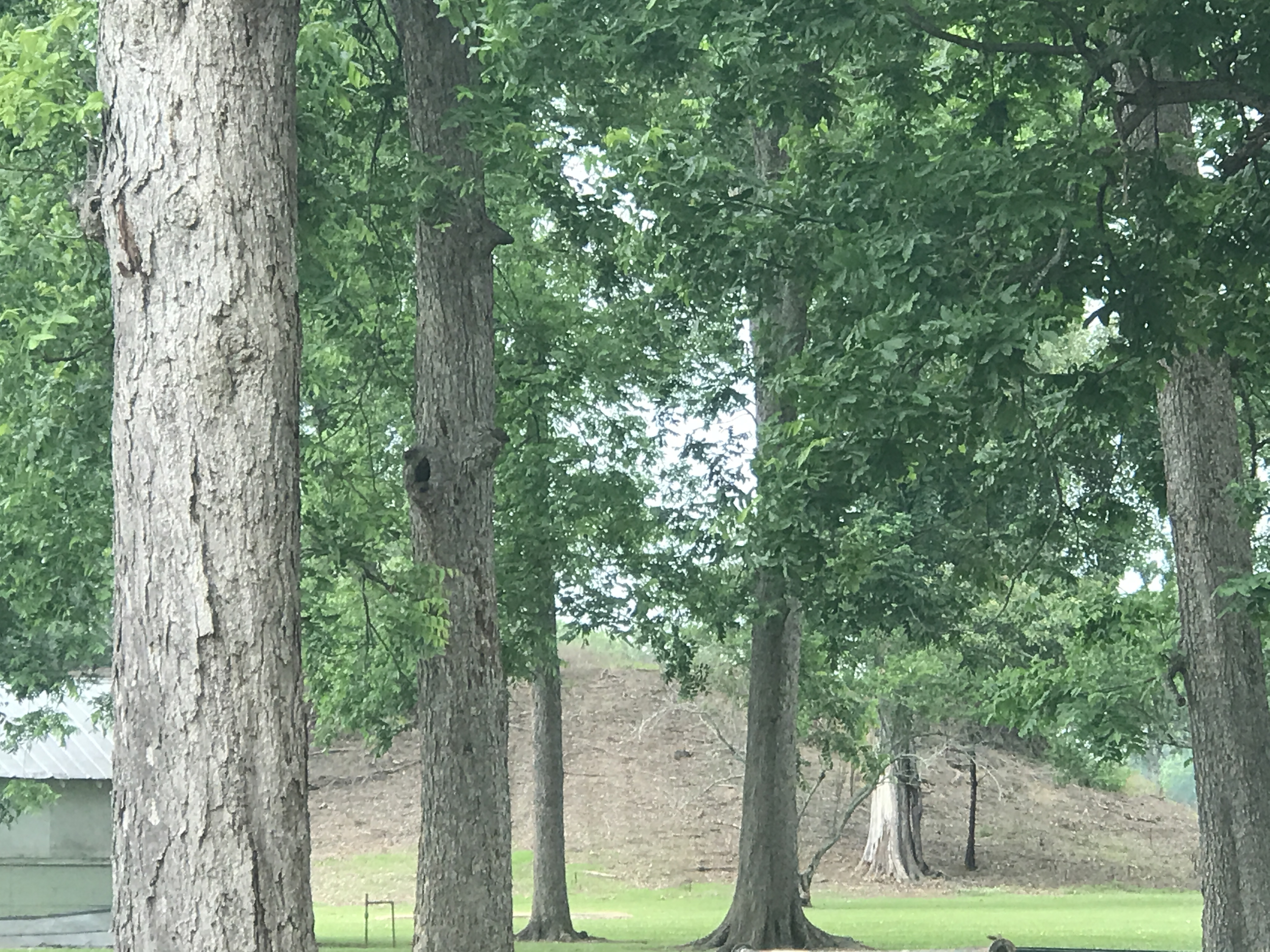
- Location: Address restricted
- Nearest city: Sicily Island, Louisiana
- Area: 220 acres (0.89 km^{2})
- Built by: John H. Lovelace, Sr.
- Architectural style: Rococo Revival
- NRHP reference No.: 80001711
- Added to NRHP: August 29, 1980

Ferry Place, or Ferry Place Plantation, located on Sicily Island in Catahoula Parish, Louisiana, was listed on the National Register of Historic Places in 1980.

The plantation house is located on some of the highest ground of Sicily Island, overlooking Lake Lovelace (Lake Louise) Architect: Lovelace, John H., Sr. Architecture: Rococo Revival

The property included a contributing building and two contributing sites. One of the sites is the Ferry Place Plantation Archaeological Site, which has evidence of pre-historic occupation. Specifically, the Peck Mound site, located in the vicinity of the Ferry Place Plantation house, is a set of five earthen mounds which were first published about by James Lord in 1933. Also the Peck Village Site exists.

John Lovelace (1740-1816) established the Lovelace family at the site. The present plantation house was built in the mid-1800s of heavy cypress timbers, upon brick piers. It is a central hall plan structure with a seven-bay front gallery. It has two front parlors each with doors onto the gallery, flanked by windows.

== See also ==
- List of plantations in Louisiana
- National Register of Historic Places listings in Catahoula Parish, Louisiana
