= Enterprise, Louisiana =

- Unincorporated community
- Location within Louisiana Location within the United States
- Coordinates: 31°54′12″N 91°52′59″W
- Country: United States
- State: Louisiana
- Parish: Catahoula
- Elevation: 59 ft (18 m)
- Time zone: UTC-6 (Central (CST))
  - Summer (DST): UTC-5 (CDT)
- ZIP code: 71425
- Area code: 318
- GNIS feature ID: 541090

Enterprise is an unincorporated community in Catahoula Parish, Louisiana, United States. The community is located along the south bank of the Ouachita River and Louisiana Highway 124, 9.7 miles (15.6 km) north-northwest of Harrisonburg. Enterprise had a post office until it closed on October 15, 2011. It still has its own ZIP code, 71425.
