= USS LST-528 =

1944 LST-491-class tank landing ship

- LST-528 Unloading at Thule, Greenland, 1952

History

United States
- Name: USS LST-528, later USS Catahoula Parish
- Namesake: Catahoula Parish, Louisiana
- Builder: Jeffersonville Boat & Machine Company, Jeffersonville, Indiana
- Laid down: 13 November 1943
- Launched: 11 January 1944
- Commissioned: 29 February 1944
- Decommissioned: 21 December 1956
- Renamed: USS Catahoula Parish (LST-528), 1 July 1955
- Stricken: 21 November 1960
- Identification: IMO number: 5254826
- Honours and awards: 1 battle star (World War II)
- Fate: Sold and converted to a bulk cement carrier, 1960

General characteristics
- Class & type: LST-491-class tank landing ship
- Displacement: 1,780 long tons (1,809 t) light; 3,640 long tons (3,698 t) full
- Length: 328 ft (100 m)
- Beam: 50 ft (15 m)
- Draft: Unloaded : 2 ft 4 in (0.71 m) forward; 7 ft 6 in (2.29 m) aft; Loaded : 8 ft 2 in (2.49 m) forward; 14 ft 1 in (4.29 m) aft
- Propulsion: 2 × General Motors 12-567 diesel engines, two shafts, twin rudders
- Speed: 12 knots (22 km/h; 14 mph)
- Boats & landing craft carried: 2 LCVPs
- Troops: Approximately 140 officers and enlisted men
- Complement: 8–10 officers, 100–115 enlisted men
- Armament: 1 × single 3-inch/50-caliber gun mount; 8 × 40 mm guns; 12 × 20 mm guns

USS Catahoula Parish (LST-528) was an LST-491-class tank landing ship built for the United States Navy during World War II. Named for Catahoula Parish, Louisiana, she was the only U.S. Naval vessel to bear the name.

LST-528 was laid down on 13 November 1943 at Jeffersonville, Indiana by the Jeffersonville Boat & Machine Company; launched on 11 January 1944; sponsored by Mrs. Madge Medlock Watt; and commissioned on 29 February 1944.

== Service history ==
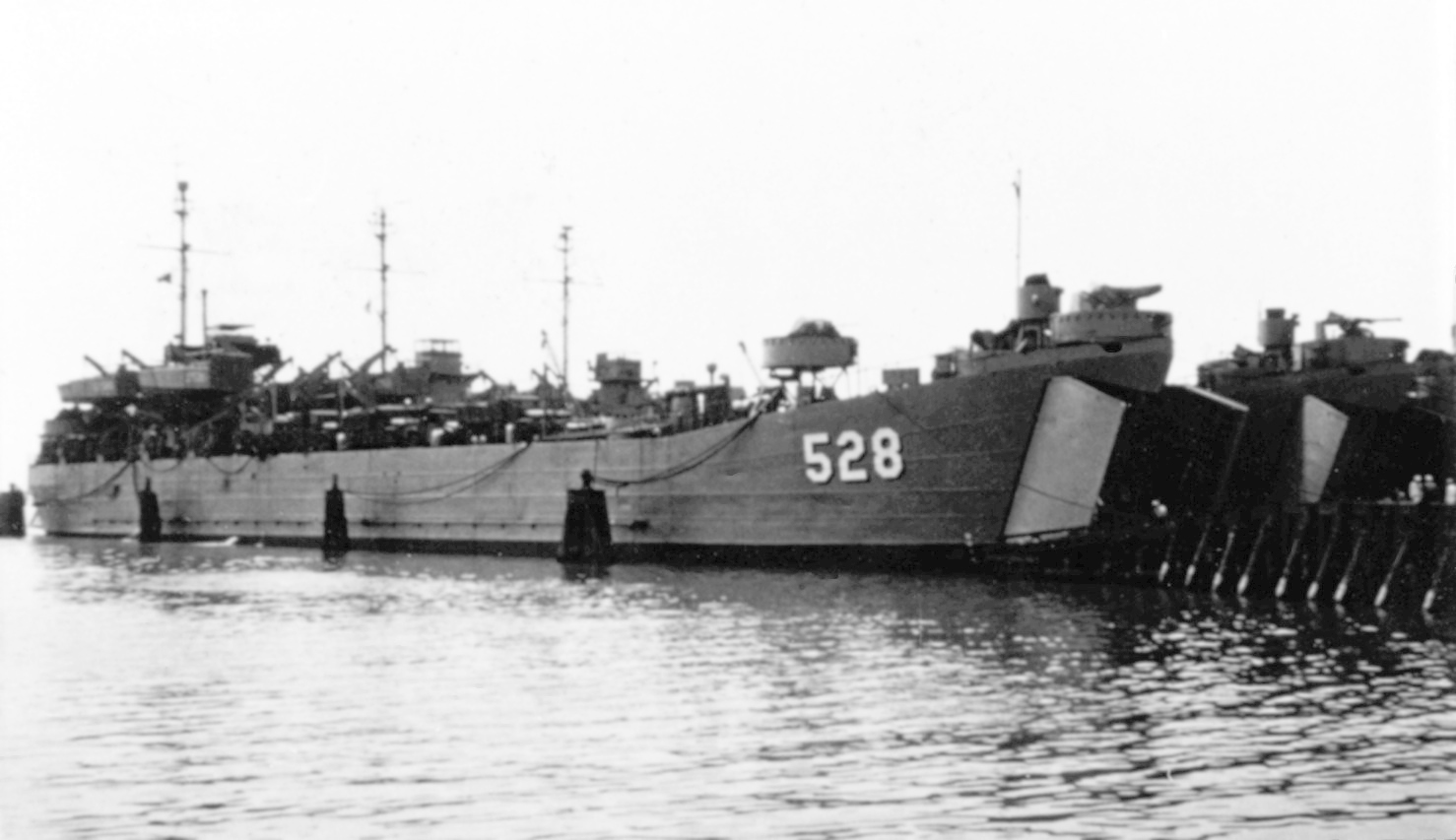
LST-528

During World War II, LST-528 was assigned to the European Theater and participated in the Invasion of Normandy in June 1944. She returned to the United States and was placed in reserve in Florida until the outbreak of the Korean War. During the war, she was part of a six-ship flotilla which took supplies to Thule, Greenland, where the US Air Force was building a base.

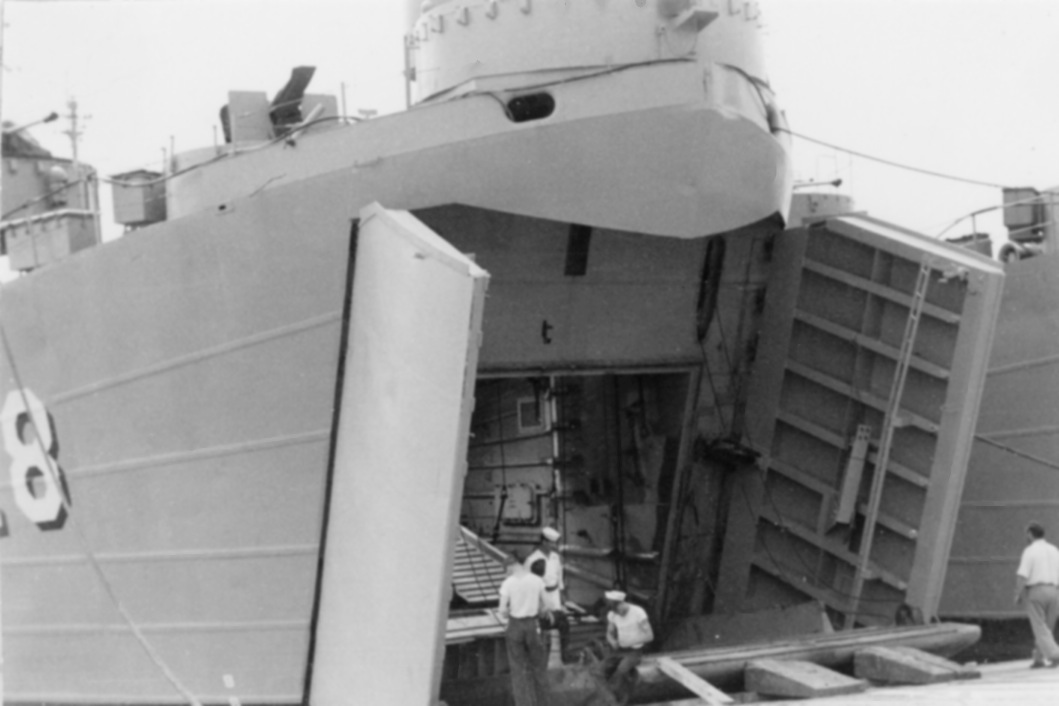
Bow doors open.

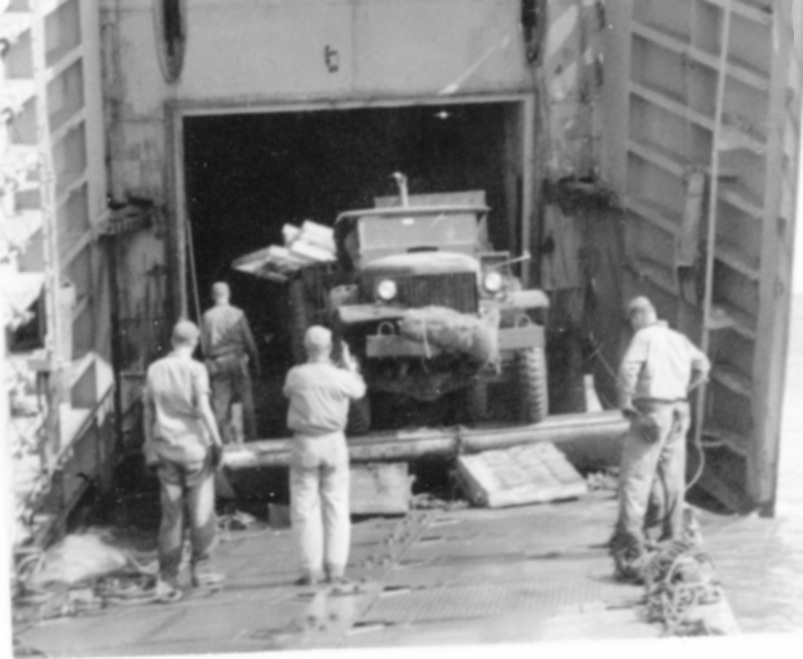
Unloading onto pontoon.

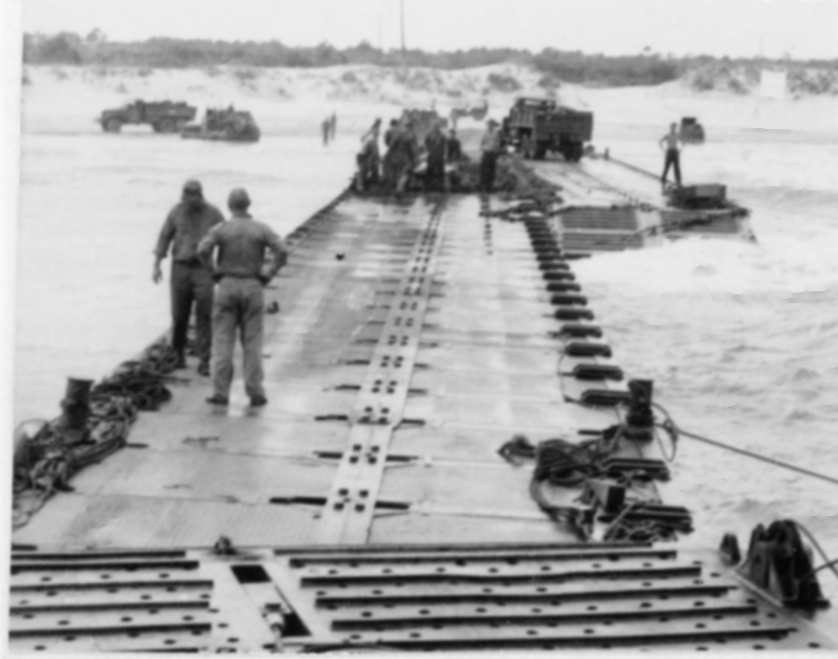
Unloading onto pontoons to cross a shallow beach.

LST-528 was decommissioned in March, 1954. The ship was named USS Catahoula Parish (LST-528) on 1 July 1955. She was struck from the Navy list on 21 November 1960, and sold to the Marquette Cement Manufacturing Company for conversion to a bulk cement carrier.

LST-528 earned one battle star for World War II service.
