= Catahoula Parish Courthouse =

- U.S. National Register of Historic Places
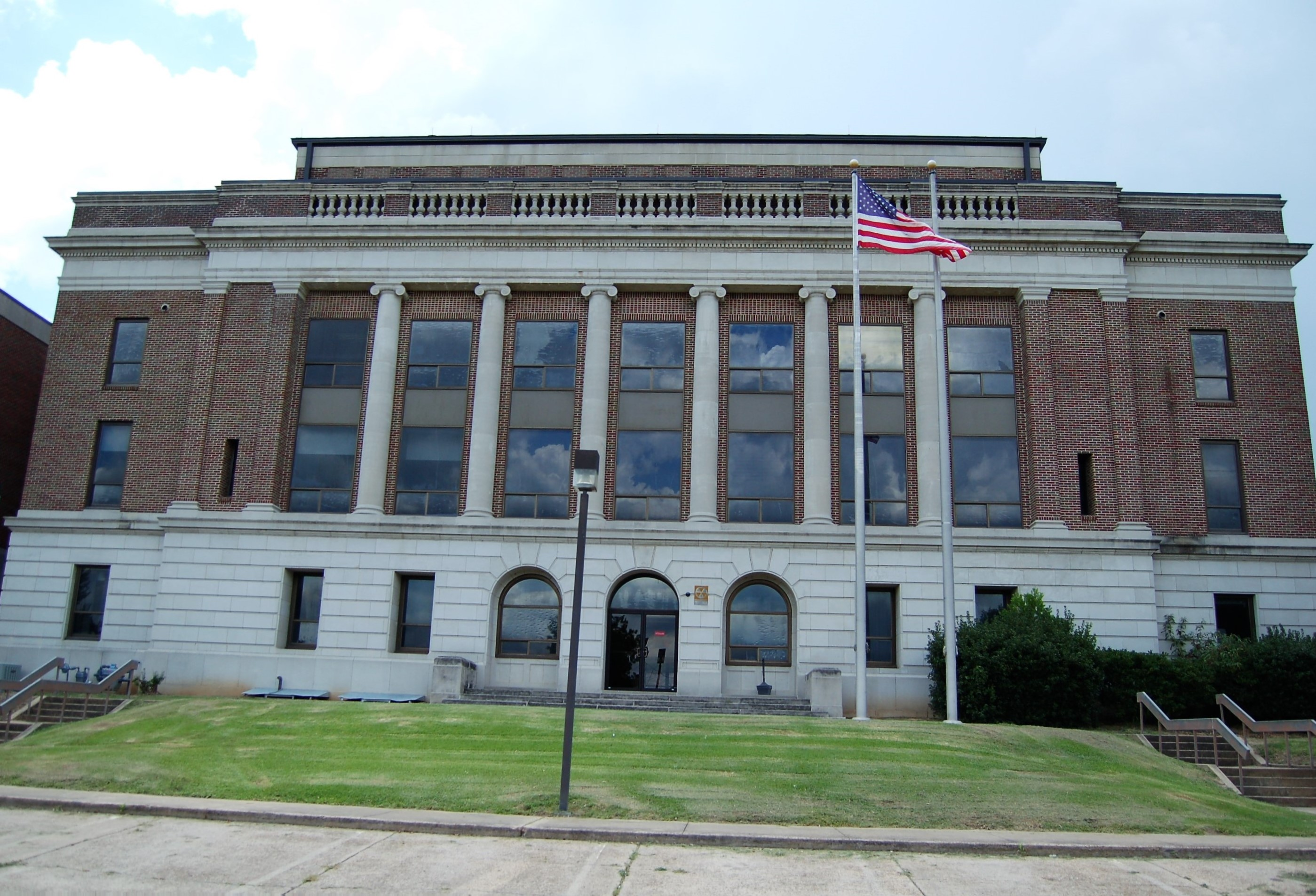

- Location within Louisiana Location within the United States
- Interactive map showing the location of Catahoula Parish Courthouse
- Location: 301 Bushley Street (LA 124), Harrisonburg, Louisiana
- Coordinates: 31°46′18″N 91°49′17″W
- Area: 2 acres (0.81 ha)
- Built: 1930
- Built by: Tudor & Ratcliffe Construction Co.
- Architect: J.W. Smith & Associates
- Architectural style: Classical Revival
- NRHP reference No.: 88002056
- Added to NRHP: October 27, 1988

The Catahoula Parish Courthouse, located at 301 Bushley Street (LA 124) in Harrisonburg, Louisiana, was built in 1930. It was listed on the National Register of Historic Places in 1988.

It is a four-story Classical Revival building "with a strong rusticated base and a colossal piano nobile composed of engaged Ionic columns." It is asserted in its 1988 NRHP nomination that "The Catahoula Parish Courthouse is architecturally significant on the local level as the grand landmark of the parish."

== See also ==
- National Register of Historic Places listings in Catahoula Parish, Louisiana
