= William S. Peck Sr. =

American politician (1873–1946)

William Smith Peck Sr.

Louisiana State Representative from Catahoula Parish
- In office 1920–1928
- Preceded by: L. Eugene Hooter
- Succeeded by: H.W. LeTissier

Personal details
- Born: 1873 Catahoula Parish; Louisiana, USA
- Died: 1946 (aged approximately 73)
- Party: Democratic
- Spouse: Estelle Woodard Smith
- Children: William S. Peck Jr. Barbara Jane Peck Gilbert Henry C. Peck Sr.
- Occupation: Businessman

William Smith Peck Sr. (1873–1946) was a Democratic member of the Louisiana House of Representatives from Sicily Island in Catahoula Parish, Louisiana, having served from 1920–1928.

Political offices
Preceded by L. Eugene Hooter	Louisiana State Representative from Cathoula Parish; 1920–1928	Succeeded by H.W. LeTissier
