= Aimwell, Louisiana =

Unincorporated community in Louisiana, U.S.

Coordinates: 31°47′01″N 91°59′36″W

Location of Aimwell within the state of Louisiana

Aimwell is an unincorporated community in Catahoula Parish, Louisiana, United States. It has also been known as Debourn and Hickory Flat in its history. The ZIP Code for Aimwell is 71401.

== History ==
Aimwell was named for the son of Joseph Willis, a pioneer minister.
