= Catahoula Parish, Louisiana =

Parish in Louisiana, United States

Catahoula Parish
- Parish
- Parish of Catahoula; Paroisse de Catahoula (French)
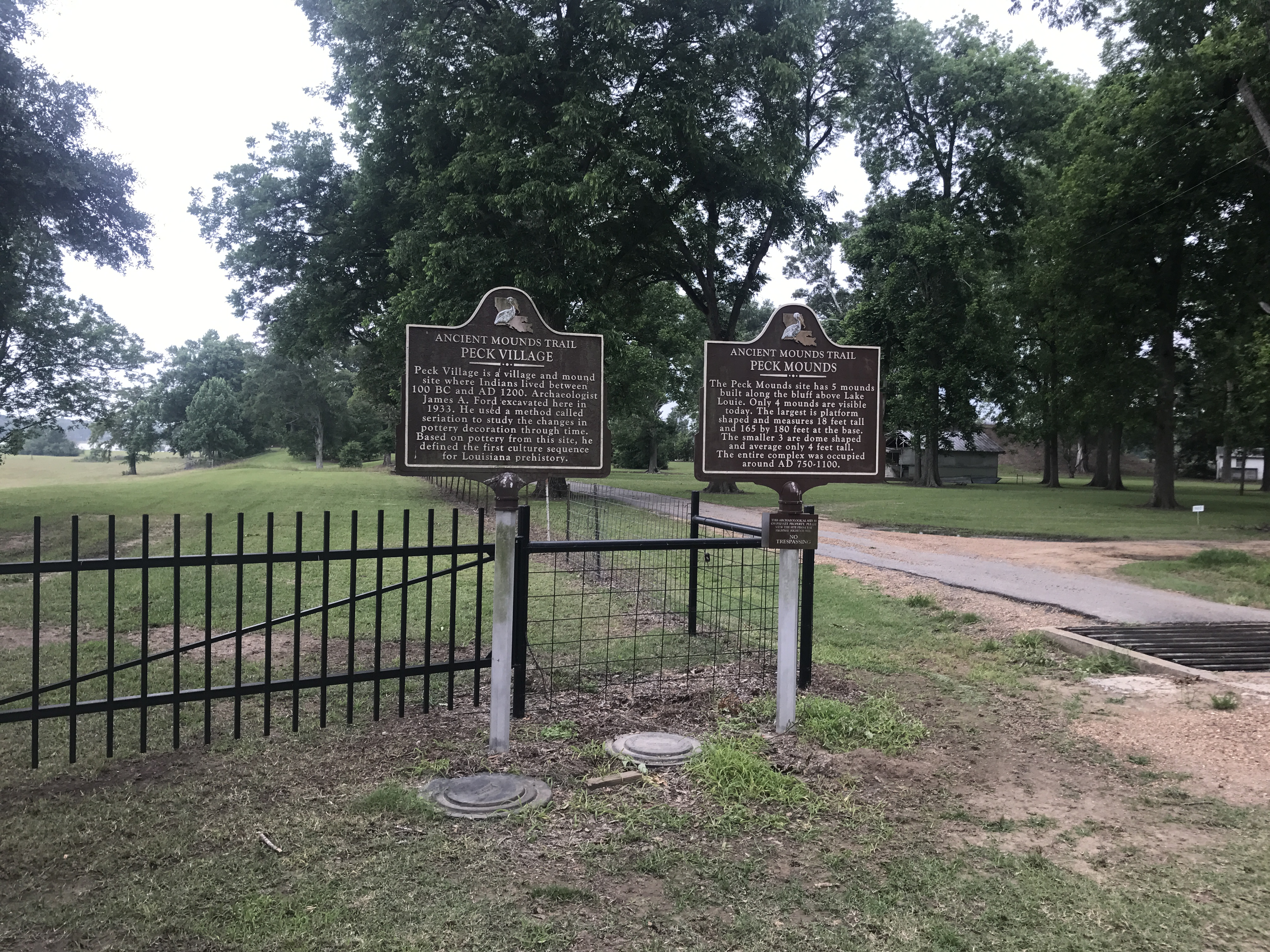
- Historic Marker Signs at Ferry Place and Peck Mounds.

- Location within the U.S. state of Louisiana
- Coordinates: 31°40′N 91°51′W
- Country: United States
- State: Louisiana
- Founded: March 23, 1808
- Named for: Tensas word for big, clear lake
- Seat: Harrisonburg
- Largest town: Jonesville

Area
  - Total: 739 sq mi (1,910 km^{2})
  - Land: 708 sq mi (1,830 km^{2})
  - Water: 31 sq mi (80 km^{2}) 4.2%

Population (2020)
  - Total: 8,906
  - Estimate (2025): 8,223 ▼
  - Density: 12.6/sq mi (4.86/km^{2})
- Time zone: UTC−6 (Central)
  - Summer (DST): UTC−5 (CDT)
- Congressional district: 5th
- Website: www.discovercatahoula.com

Catahoula Parish (French: Paroisse de Catahoula) is a parish in the U.S. state of Louisiana. As of the 2020 census, the population was 8,906. Its seat is Harrisonburg, on the Ouachita River. The parish was formed in 1808, shortly after the United States acquired this territory in the Louisiana Purchase of 1803.

== History ==
=== Prehistory ===
Catahoula Parish was the home to many succeeding Native American groups in the thousands of years before European settlements began. Peoples of the Marksville culture, Troyville culture, Coles Creek culture and Plaquemine culture built villages and mound sites throughout the area. Notable examples include Peck Mounds, and the Troyville Earthworks. The Troyville Earthworks have components dating from 100 BCE to 700 CE during the Baytown to the Troyville-Coles Creek periods.

It once had the tallest mound in Louisiana at 82 feet (25 m) in height; it was the second-tallest mound in North America (after Monk's Mound at Cahokia Mounds). This mound was destroyed to make way for the Jonesville bridge over the Black River.

=== Historic era ===
The parish was founded in 1808 and originally incorporated a very large area. As population increased in the region, new parishes were organized from the territory first included in Catahoula Parish. The parish was divided by the state in 1910, when La Salle Parish was formed from its old western section. As one of the new parishes organized during early United States settlement of this part of the state, it has had the third most boundary changes since that time. Only Natchitoches and Ouachita parishes have had more revisions of boundaries.

This area was settled primarily by migrants from the southern United States after the Louisiana Purchase, when the US acquired the vast, former French-claimed territory west of the Mississippi River. White migrants to north and central Louisiana were from the South, and were mainly of British descent and Protestant religions. They brought a new influence into Louisiana. Some also brought or purchased African-American slaves to work on larger plantations. Many of these were from the Upper South, which sold slaves through the domestic market. They brought their own cultural influences as well.

The plantations included the Battleground Plantation, Ferry Place Plantation, and Marengo Plantation, all of which are listed on the National Register of Historic Places. The other listed buildings include Catahoula Parish Courthouse, Harrisonburg Methodist Church, Sargent House, and Spring Ridge Baptist Church.

== Catahoula dog ==
Catahoula Parish lays claim to its namesake Catahoula Leopard dog breed. The Catahoula breed was owned by Colonel James "Jim" Bowie of the Alamo and his brother Rezin Bowie, both of Louisiana. During the early 1900s, Theodore Roosevelt used the Catahoula when hunting. Louisiana Governor Earl Kemp Long also collected these dogs.

== Geography ==
According to the U.S. Census Bureau, the parish has a total area of 739 square miles (1,910 km^{2}), of which 708 square miles (1,830 km^{2}) is land and 31 square miles (80 km^{2}) (4.2%) is water. It is home to Sandy Lake.

=== Major highways ===
- US 84
- US 425 / LA 15
- LA 8
- LA 28
- LA 124
- LA 126
- LA 459
- LA 559
- LA 564
- LA 567
- LA 600
- LA 913
- LA 914
- LA 915
- LA 916
- LA 921
- LA 922
- LA 923
- LA 1017
- LA 1018 (LA 1018-3)
- LA 3037
- LA 3101
- LA 3102
- LA 3148
- LA 3165
- LA 3203
- LA 3264
- LA 3270

=== Adjacent parishes ===
- Franklin Parish (north)
- Tensas Parish (northeast)
- Concordia Parish (east)
- Avoyelles Parish (south)
- La Salle Parish (west)
- Caldwell Parish (northwest)

=== National protected area ===
- Catahoula National Wildlife Refuge (part)

== Demographics ==
Historical population
Census	Pop.	Note	%±
1820	2,287		—
1830	2,581		12.9%
1840	4,955		92.0%
1850	7,132		43.9%
1860	11,651		63.4%
1870	8,475		−27.3%
1880	10,277		21.3%
1890	12,002		16.8%
1900	16,351		36.2%
1910	10,415		−36.3%
1920	11,074		6.3%
1930	12,451		12.4%
1940	14,618		17.4%
1950	11,834		−19.0%
1960	11,421		−3.5%
1970	11,769		3.0%
1980	12,287		4.4%
1990	11,065		−9.9%
2000	10,920		−1.3%
2010	10,407		−4.7%
2020	8,906		−14.4%
2025 (est.)	8,223	▼	−7.7%
U.S. Decennial Census; 1790-1960 1900-1990; 1990-2000 2010

=== 2020 census ===
As of the 2020 census, there were 8,906 people, 3,505 households, and 2,421 families residing in the parish. The median age was 41.3 years; 22.0% of residents were under the age of 18 and 20.2% were 65 years of age or older. For every 100 females there were 103.8 males, and for every 100 females age 18 and over there were 104.3 males age 18 and over.

The racial makeup of the parish was 64.9% White, 25.8% Black or African American, 0.5% American Indian and Alaska Native, 0.3% Asian, 0.1% Native Hawaiian and Pacific Islander, 5.7% from some other race, and 2.7% from two or more races. Hispanic or Latino residents of any race comprised 6.9% of the population.

There were 3,505 households in the parish, of which 28.4% had children under the age of 18 living in them, 44.0% were married-couple households, 19.3% were households with a male householder and no spouse or partner present, and 31.5% were households with a female householder and no spouse or partner present. About 30.5% of all households were made up of individuals and 15.5% had someone living alone who was 65 years of age or older.

There were 4,412 housing units, of which 20.6% were vacant. Among occupied housing units, 77.8% were owner-occupied and 22.2% were renter-occupied. The homeowner vacancy rate was 1.1% and the rental vacancy rate was 9.5%.

<0.1% of residents lived in urban areas, while 100.0% lived in rural areas.

=== Racial and ethnic composition ===
Catahoula Parish, Louisiana – Racial and ethnic composition Note: the US Census treats Hispanic/Latino as an ethnic category. This table excludes Latinos from the racial categories and assigns them to a separate category. Hispanics/Latinos may be of any race.
Race / Ethnicity (NH = Non-Hispanic)	Pop 1980	Pop 1990	Pop 2000	Pop 2010	Pop 2020	% 1980	% 1990	% 2000	% 2010	% 2020
White alone (NH)	9,052	8,103	7,785	6,946	5,738	73.67%	73.23%	71.29%	66.74%	64.43%
Black or African American alone (NH)	3,148	2,870	2,942	3,273	2,275	25.62%	25.94%	26.94%	31.45%	25.54%
Native American or Alaska Native alone (NH)	17	16	21	33	34	0.14%	0.14%	0.19%	0.32%	0.38%
Asian alone (NH)	1	5	14	3	26	0.01%	0.05%	0.13%	0.03%	0.29%
Native Hawaiian or Pacific Islander alone (NH)	x	x	0	0	6	x	x	0.00%	0.00%	0.07%
Other race alone (NH)	0	0	0	0	10	0.00%	0.00%	0.00%	0.00%	0.11%
Mixed race or Multiracial (NH)	x	x	57	62	203	x	x	0.52%	0.60%	2.28%
Hispanic or Latino (any race)	69	71	101	90	614	0.56%	0.64%	0.92%	0.86%	6.89%
Total	12,287	11,065	10,920	10,407	8,906	100.00%	100.00%	100.00%	100.00%	100.00%

=== 2000 census ===
As of the census of 2000, there were 10,920 people, 4,082 households, and 2,992 families residing in the parish. The population density was 16 people per square mile (6.2 people/km^{2}). There were 5,351 housing units at an average density of 8 per square mile (3.1/km^{2}). The racial makeup of the parish was 71.78% White, 27.12% Black or African American, 0.19% Native American, 0.13% Asian, 0.19% from other races, and 0.59% from two or more races. 0.92% of the population were Hispanic or Latino of any race.

There were 4,082 households, out of which 32.70% had children under the age of 18 living with them, 54.70% were married couples living together, 14.50% had a female householder with no husband present, and 26.70% were non-families. 24.30% of all households were made up of individuals, and 11.30% had someone living alone who was 65 years of age or older. The average household size was 2.55 and the average family size was 3.02.

In the parish the population was spread out, with 25.80% under the age of 18, 10.00% from 18 to 24, 26.80% from 25 to 44, 23.00% from 45 to 64, and 14.40% who were 65 years of age or older. The median age was 37 years. For every 100 females there were 100.60 males. For every 100 females age 18 and over, there were 98.00 males.

The median income for a household in the parish was $22,528, and the median income for a family was $27,206. Males had a median income of $26,181 versus $18,427 for females. The per capita income for the parish was $12,608. About 22.60% of families and 28.10% of the population were below the poverty line, including 41.80% of those under age 18 and 20.10% of those age 65 or over.

== Education ==
Catahoula Parish School Board operates local public schools.

== National Guard ==
The 1087TH Transportation Company of the 165TH CSS (combat service support) Battalion of the 139TH RSG (regional support group) resides in Jonesville, Louisiana.

== Communities ==
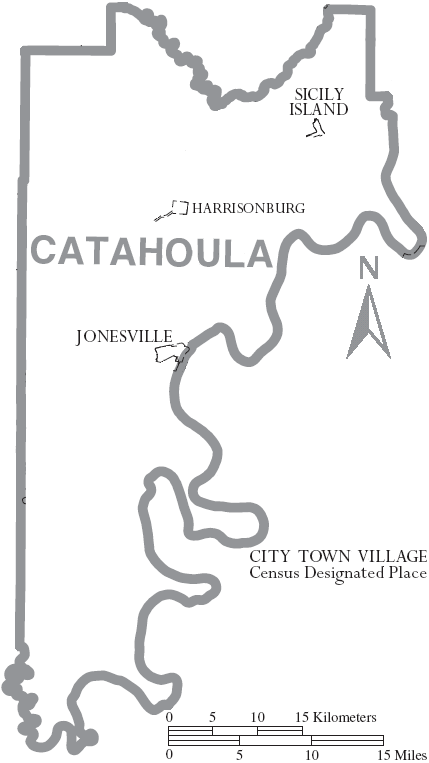
Map of Catahoula Parish, Louisiana With Municipal Labels

=== Town ===
- Jonesville

=== Villages ===
- Harrisonburg
- Sicily Island

=== Unincorporated areas ===
==== Census-designated place ====
- Wallace Ridge

==== Unincorporated communities ====
- Aimwell
- Enterprise
- Foules
- Larto
- Leland
- Manifest
- Sandy Lake

== Notable people ==
- Ralph E. King, Winnsboro physician who represented Catahoula Parish in the Louisiana State Senate from 1944 to 1952 and again from 1956 to 1960
- Moses J. Liddell was appointed by President Grover Cleveland as a judge for the Supreme Court of the Montana Territory
- St. John Richardson Liddell, Confederate general in the American Civil War, owned large plantation in Catahoula Parish
- Sara T. Mayo, physician and humanitarian reformer
- Joe Raymond Peace, football coach
- William S. Peck, Sr., politician
- Chris Shivers, two-time (2000, 2003) PBR World Champion bull rider

== Politics ==
United States presidential election results for Catahoula Parish, Louisiana
Year	Republican		Democratic		Third party(ies)	
Year	No.	%	No.	%	No.	%
1912	11	2.96%	275	73.92%	86	23.12%
1916	20	4.17%	459	95.63%	1	0.21%
1920	176	25.40%	517	74.60%	0	0.00%
1924	78	26.35%	218	73.65%	0	0.00%
1928	341	32.45%	710	67.55%	0	0.00%
1932	29	2.12%	1,340	97.88%	0	0.00%
1936	98	6.71%	1,363	93.29%	0	0.00%
1940	134	8.14%	1,512	91.86%	0	0.00%
1944	291	19.41%	1,208	80.59%	0	0.00%
1948	86	5.16%	515	30.91%	1,065	63.93%
1952	884	39.82%	1,336	60.18%	0	0.00%
1956	845	46.89%	707	39.23%	250	13.87%
1960	971	45.54%	558	26.17%	603	28.28%
1964	2,387	81.00%	560	19.00%	0	0.00%
1968	755	17.97%	769	18.31%	2,677	63.72%
1972	2,683	73.15%	823	22.44%	162	4.42%
1976	2,086	43.76%	2,547	53.43%	134	2.81%
1980	2,942	53.19%	2,414	43.64%	175	3.16%
1984	3,640	67.52%	1,649	30.59%	102	1.89%
1988	2,862	57.82%	1,916	38.71%	172	3.47%
1992	1,976	36.12%	2,570	46.97%	925	16.91%
1996	1,770	34.26%	2,692	52.11%	704	13.63%
2000	2,912	61.11%	1,718	36.05%	135	2.83%
2004	3,219	64.98%	1,673	33.77%	62	1.25%
2008	3,486	66.72%	1,659	31.75%	80	1.53%
2012	2,744	65.44%	1,408	33.58%	41	0.98%
2016	3,479	71.64%	1,322	27.22%	55	1.13%
2020	3,541	72.89%	1,269	26.12%	48	0.99%
2024	3,258	74.93%	1,060	24.38%	30	0.69%

Catahoula Parish has proven to be an accurate bellwether for the state, consistently reflecting the statewide presidential election outcomes in every election since 1964. Although the parish trends Democratic in local elections, in the 2008 presidential election, Barack Obama of Illinois received only 1,659 votes (31.8 percent) compared to 3,486 (66.7 percent) for the Republican nominee, John S. McCain of Arizona. The 2008 totals mirrored those of 2004, when Catahoula Parish cast 3,219 (65.0 percent) for President George W. Bush and 1,673 ballots (34.8 percent) for his Democratic rival, Senator John F. Kerry of Massachusetts. Local officials are almost entirely Democratic in affiliation. Republicans rarely contest such elections.

== See also ==
- Jones-Liddell feud
- National Register of Historic Places listings in Catahoula Parish, Louisiana
- USS Catahoula Parish (LST-528)
