= Jonesville, Louisiana =

Jonesville, Louisiana Troyville
- Town
- Nickname: Bucktown
- Location of Jonesville in Catahoula Parish, Louisiana.

- Location of Louisiana in the United States
- Coordinates: 31°37′32″N 91°49′44″W
- Country: United States
- State: Louisiana
- Parish: Catahoula

Area
  - Total: 1.92 sq mi (4.97 km^{2})
  - Land: 1.92 sq mi (4.97 km^{2})
  - Water: 0 sq mi (0.00 km^{2})
- Elevation: 59 ft (18 m)

Population (2020)
  - Total: 1,728
  - Density: 900.2/sq mi (347.55/km^{2})
- Time zone: UTC-6 (CST)
  - Summer (DST): UTC-5 (CDT)
- ZIP code: 71343
- Area code: 318
- FIPS code: 22-38775
- GNIS feature ID: 2405922

Jonesville is the largest town in Catahoula Parish, Louisiana, United States, at the confluence of the Ouachita, Tensas, and Little rivers. The three rivers become the Black River at Jonesville.

As of the 2020 census, Jonesville had a population of 1,728.

The four rivers which intersect near Jonesville are all subject to flooding. There are surrounding soybean and cotton fields; a few plantation houses still stand, built during the former slavery-based, planter-dominated economy; the population fell significantly when a textile mill shut down in the late 1980s.

== History ==
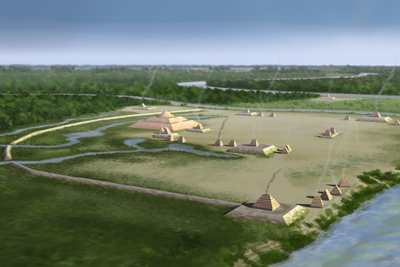
Troyville Earthworks

Jonesville was once the site of the Troyville Earthworks, built by Native Americans who occupied the site from 100 BCE to 700 CE. Once home to between 9-11 mounds, most have been leveled to make way for the construction of the modern town, including the Great Mound which was once 82 feet (25 m) in height. It was the tallest mound in Louisiana and the second tallest in the United States, after Monks Mound at Cahokia in Illinois. It was destroyed for bridge approach fill in 1931. The site is the type site for the Troyville culture of the lower Ouachita and Tensas River valleys.

== Geography ==
Jonesville's northern border is formed by the Little River, while its eastern border is formed by the Black River. The confluence of the Ouachita and Tensas rivers to form the Black River is 0.4 miles (0.64 km) north of the town limits. Concordia Parish is to the east across the Black River.

U.S. Route 84 passes through the town as 4th Street and leads east 16 miles (26 km) to Ferriday and west 23 miles (37 km) to Jena. Louisiana State Highway 124 leads north 10 miles (16 km) to Harrisonburg, the Catahoula Parish seat, and south 24 miles (39 km) to its end in Argo.

According to the United States Census Bureau, Jonesville has a total area of 1.9 square miles (5.0 km^{2}), all land.

=== Climate ===
The climate in the area is characterized by hot, humid summers and generally mild-to-cool winters. According to the Köppen Climate Classification system, Jonesville has a humid subtropical climate, abbreviated "Cfa" on climate maps.

== Demographics ==
Historical population
Census	Pop.	Note	%±
1880	90		—
1890	172		91.1%
1910	287		—
1920	1,029		258.5%
1930	1,123		9.1%
1940	2,080		85.2%
1950	1,954		−6.1%
1960	2,347		20.1%
1970	2,761		17.6%
1980	2,828		2.4%
1990	2,720		−3.8%
2000	2,469		−9.2%
2010	2,265		−8.3%
2020	1,728		−23.7%
2025 (est.)	1,531	▼	−11.4%
U.S. Decennial Census

=== 2020 census ===
Jonesville racial composition
Race	Number	Percentage
White (non-Hispanic)	357	20.66%
Black or African American (non-Hispanic)	1,303	75.41%
Native American	4	0.23%
Asian	2	0.12%
Pacific Islander	1	0.06%
Other/Mixed	35	2.03%
Hispanic or Latino	26	1.5%

As of the 2020 census, there were 1,728 people, 719 households, and 386 families residing in the town.

The median age was 38.2 years. 25.6% of residents were under the age of 18 and 17.0% were 65 years of age or older. For every 100 females, there were 88.4 males, and for every 100 females age 18 and over there were 83.6 males.

0.0% of residents lived in urban areas, while 100.0% lived in rural areas.

Of the 719 households, 32.4% had children under the age of 18 living in them. 24.8% were married-couple households, 22.9% were households with a male householder and no spouse or partner present, and 45.6% were households with a female householder and no spouse or partner present. About 35.9% of all households were made up of individuals, and 17.4% had someone living alone who was 65 years of age or older.

There were 876 housing units, of which 17.9% were vacant. The homeowner vacancy rate was 1.6% and the rental vacancy rate was 12.5%.

=== 2000 census ===
As of the census of 2000, there were 2,469 people, 916 households, and 620 families residing in the town. The population density was 1,291.4 inhabitants per square mile (498.6/km^{2}). There were 1,032 housing units at an average density of 539.8 per square mile (208.4/km^{2}). The racial makeup of the town was 39.77% White, 59.17% African American, 0.28% Native American, 0.12% Asian, and 0.65% from two or more races. Hispanic or Latino of any race were 0.97% of the population.

There were 916 households, out of which 36.0% had children under the age of 18 living with them, 34.7% were married couples living together, 28.2% had a female householder with no husband present, and 32.3% were non-families. 28.7% of all households were made up of individuals, and 11.6% had someone living alone who was 65 years of age or older. The average household size was 2.57 and the average family size was 3.15.

In the town, the population was spread out, with 29.5% under the age of 18, 9.3% from 18 to 24, 26.2% from 25 to 44, 18.7% from 45 to 64, and 16.3% who were 65 years of age or older. The median age was 35 years. For every 100 females, there were 84.7 males. For every 100 females age 18 and over, there were 74.5 males.

The median income for a household in the town was $18,622, and the median income for a family was $23,462. Males had a median income of $21,139 versus $18,482 for females. The per capita income for the town was $10,173. About 31.1% of families and 36.8% of the population were below the poverty line, including 49.7% of those under age 18 and 25.5% of those age 65 or over.

== Notable people ==
- Tommy McLain, singer-songwriter, musician, born in Jonesville, March 15, 1940
- Chris Shivers, former champion bull rider
- Jack C. Watson, lawyer and judge, born in Jonesville

== See also ==
- KZKR
- Long–Allen Bridge (Jonesville)
