= Harrisonburg, Louisiana =

- Village
- Location of Harrisonburg in Catahoula Parish, Louisiana.

- Location of Louisiana in the United States
- Coordinates: 31°46′05″N 91°49′30″W
- Country: United States
- State: Louisiana
- Parish: Catahoula

Area
  - Total: 1.05 sq mi (2.73 km^{2})
  - Land: 0.97 sq mi (2.51 km^{2})
  - Water: 0.085 sq mi (0.22 km^{2})
- Elevation: 79 ft (24 m)

Population (2020)
  - Total: 277
  - Density: 286.0/sq mi (110.44/km^{2})
- Time zone: UTC-6 (CST)
  - Summer (DST): UTC-5 (CDT)
- ZIP Code: 71340
- Area code: 318
- FIPS code: 22-33210
- GNIS feature ID: 2407473
- Website: villageofharrisonburg.com

Harrisonburg is a village in and the parish seat of Catahoula Parish, Louisiana, United States. As of the 2020 census, Harrisonburg had a population of 277.

Riley J. Wilson, who held Louisiana's 5th congressional district seat from 1915 to 1937, resided in Harrisonburg, where he was principal of Harrisonburg High School and state district court judge prior to his election to Congress.

== History ==
Harrisonburg was named for the Harrison family of Virginia.

Fort Beauregard, located on a bluff in the northern corner of the village, was a Confederate stronghold during the American Civil War. In 1863, the fort successfully defended Harrisonburg from the attack of four Union gunboats coming from the Black River to the Ouachita River. After four days of bombardment, little damage was done, and the gunboats retired down river. Harrisonburg and fort were evacuated before Brig. General Crocker's considerable naval and army forces arrived on September 4, 1863. The Confederates lost eight significant artillery pieces although two large 32 pound cannons were preserved. On March 1 through the 4, 1864 the town was again attacked by Union gunboats, but the falling river level prevented the advance on Monroe.

The village of Harrisonburg formerly staged reenactments at Fort Beauregard, also known as Fort Hill, but those ceremonies ended in the late 20th century. These reenactments were brought back to life for 2015, but halted in 2016, still planned for future years to come.

Harrisonburg was once a trade capital because of its location on the Ouachita River, with easy access to the Mississippi River and New Orleans. The Harrisonburg Road ran through the area as it crossed Louisiana between Mississippi's Natchez Trace and Texas' El Camino Real.

== Geography ==
Harrisonburg is located on the west bank of the Ouachita River. Louisiana State Highway 8 passes through the village, leading northeast across the Ouachita to Sicily Island, and southwest 18 miles (29 km) to U.S. Route 84 near Catahoula Lake. Jonesville, the largest town in Catahoula Parish, is 10 miles (16 km) south of Harrisonburg via Highway 124.

According to the United States Census Bureau, Harrisonburg has a total area of 1.0 square mile (2.7 km^{2}), of which 0.97 square miles (2.5 km^{2}) is land and 0.077 square miles (0.2 km^{2}), or 8.07%, is water.

=== Climate ===
The climate consists of hot, humid summers and generally mild to cool winters. According to the Köppen Climate Classification system, Harrisonburg has a humid subtropical climate, abbreviated "Cfa" on climate maps.

== Demographics ==
Historical population
| Census | Pop. | Note | %± |
|---|---|---|---|
| 1850 | 326 | | — |
| 1870 | 217 | | — |
| 1880 | 243 | | 12.0% |
| 1890 | 359 | | 47.7% |
| 1900 | 303 | | −15.6% |
| 1910 | 361 | | 19.1% |
| 1920 | 399 | | 10.5% |
| 1930 | 437 | | 9.5% |
| 1940 | 422 | | −3.4% |
| 1950 | 544 | | 28.9% |
| 1960 | 594 | | 9.2% |
| 1970 | 626 | | 5.4% |
| 1980 | 610 | | −2.6% |
| 1990 | 453 | | −25.7% |
| 2000 | 746 | | 64.7% |
| 2010 | 348 | | −53.4% |
| 2020 | 277 | | −20.4% |
| 2025 (est.) | 261 | ▼ | −5.8% |
U.S. Decennial Census

=== 2020 census ===
Harrisonburg village, Louisiana – Racial and ethnic composition Note: the US Census treats Hispanic/Latino as an ethnic category. This table excludes Latinos from the racial categories and assigns them to a separate category. Hispanics/Latinos may be of any race.
| Race / Ethnicity (NH = Non-Hispanic) | Pop 2000 | Pop 2010 | Pop 2020 | % 2000 | % 2010 | % 2020 |
|---|---|---|---|---|---|---|
| White alone (NH) | 324 | 242 | 198 | 43.43% | 69.54% | 71.48% |
| Black or African American alone (NH) | 409 | 87 | 57 | 54.83% | 25.00% | 20.58% |
| Native American or Alaska Native alone (NH) | 0 | 2 | 0 | 0.00% | 0.57% | 0.00% |
| Asian alone (NH) | 11 | 0 | 1 | 1.47% | 0.00% | 0.36% |
| Pacific Islander alone (NH) | 0 | 0 | 0 | 0.00% | 0.00% | 0.00% |
| Other Race alone (NH) | 0 | 0 | 0 | 0.00% | 0.00% | 0.00% |
| Mixed race or Multiracial (NH) | 2 | 8 | 3 | 0.27% | 2.30% | 1.08% |
| Hispanic or Latino (any race) | 0 | 9 | 18 | 0.00% | 2.59% | 6.50% |
| Total | 746 | 348 | 277 | 100.00% | 100.00% | 100.00% |

As of the census of 2000, there were 746 people, 142 households, and 91 families residing in the village. The population density was 792.5 inhabitants per square mile (306.0/km^{2}). There were 157 housing units at an average density of 166.8 per square mile (64.4/km^{2}). The racial makeup of the village was 43.43% White, 54.83% African American, 1.47% Asian, and 0.27% from two or more races.

There were 142 households, out of which 25.4% had children under the age of 18 living with them, 42.3% were married couples living together, 14.8% had a female householder with no husband present, and 35.9% were non-families. 34.5% of all households were made up of individuals, and 22.5% had someone living alone who was 65 years of age or older. The average household size was 2.50 and the average family size was 3.24.

In the village, the population was spread out, with 13.4% under the age of 18, 22.4% from 18 to 24, 42.5% from 25 to 44, 12.2% from 45 to 64, and 9.5% who were 65 years of age or older. The median age was 30 years. For every 100 females, there were 273.0 males. For every 100 females age 18 and over, there were 316.8 males.

The median income for a household in the village was $21,786, and the median income for a family was $31,250. Males had a median income of $15,000 versus $14,167 for females. The per capita income for the village was $6,242, making it the poorest census-designated place in the state. About 17.1% of families and 27.6% of the population were below the poverty line, including 26.2% of those under age 18 and 25.7% of those age 65 or over.

The village is currently undergoing a dramatic demographic decline. It runs the risk of becoming a ghost town.

== Education ==
- Harrisonburg High School
