= Sicily Island, Louisiana =

- Village
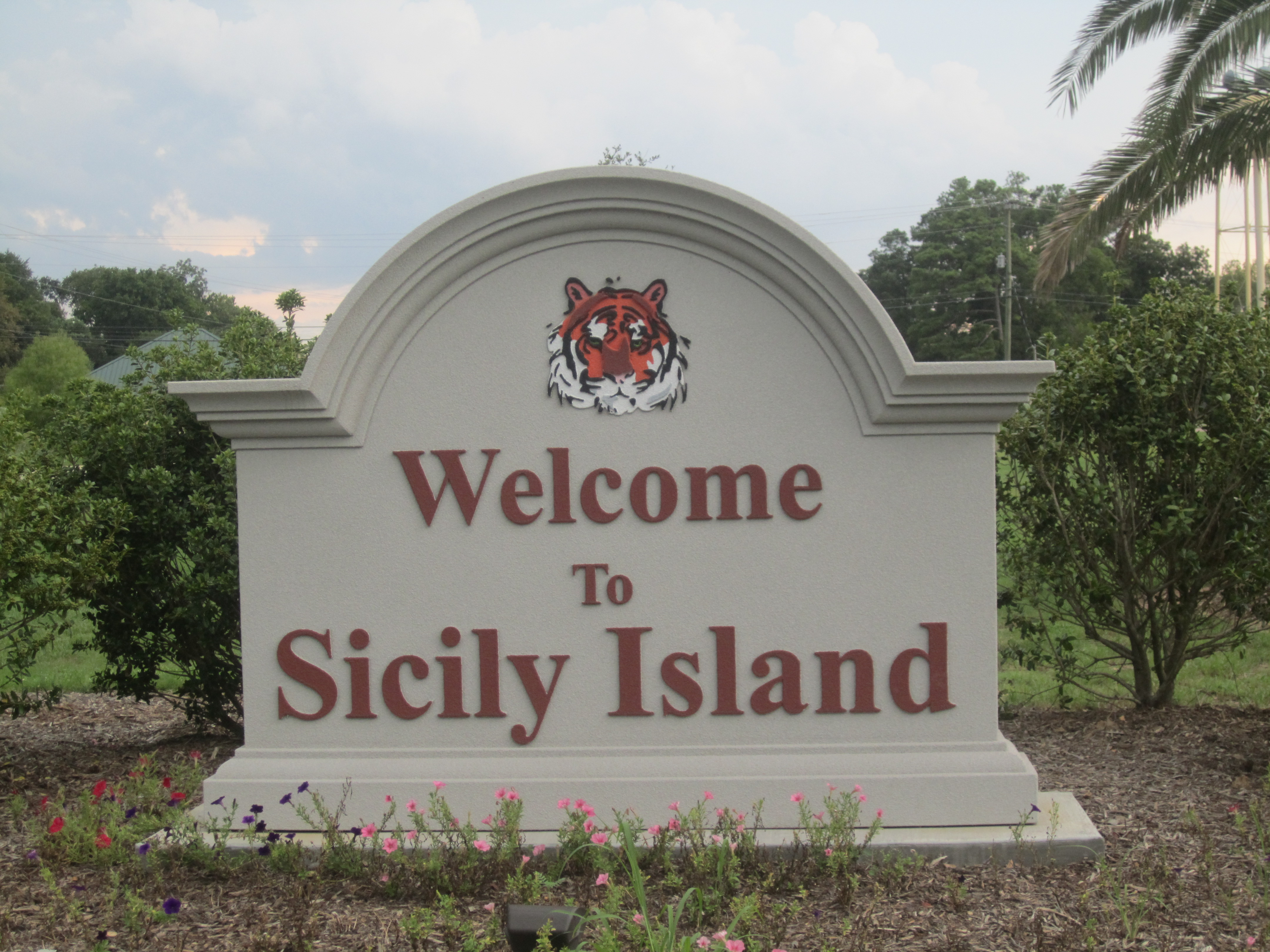

- Location of Sicily Island in Catahoula Parish, Louisiana.

- Location of Louisiana in the United States
- Coordinates: 31°50′58″N 91°39′35″W
- Country: United States
- State: Louisiana
- Parish: Catahoula

Area
  - Total: 0.58 sq mi (1.49 km^{2})
  - Land: 0.58 sq mi (1.49 km^{2})
  - Water: 0 sq mi (0.00 km^{2})
- Elevation: 72 ft (22 m)

Population (2020)
  - Total: 366
  - Density: 637.3/sq mi (246.05/km^{2})
- Time zone: UTC-6 (CST)
  - Summer (DST): UTC-5 (CDT)
- Area code: 318
- FIPS code: 22-70245
- GNIS feature ID: 2407545

Sicily Island is a village in Catahoula Parish, Louisiana, United States. The population was 336 at the 2020 census.

== Geography ==
Sicily Island is located in northeastern Catahoula Parish. U.S. Route 425 passes through the village, leading north 23 miles (37 km) to Winnsboro and southeast 30 miles (48 km) to Natchez, Mississippi. Louisiana State Highway 8 leads southwest 11 miles (18 km) to Harrisonburg, the Catahoula Parish seat.

According to the United States Census Bureau, Sicily Island has a total area of 0.58 square miles (1.49 km^{2}), all land. Despite its name, Sicily Island is not an island; instead, nearby lakes and rivers gave the area a shape early settlers considered reminiscent of the island of Sicily.

== History ==
In the early 1700s, the area that would become Sicily Island was the site of a Natchez settlement. In January 1731, towards the end of the Natchez Revolt, French forces besieged the Natchez fort, compelling the surrender of 45 men and 450 women and children. Although the bulk of the Natchez leaders and warriors escaped, the siege marked the last major engagement of the war.

In 1881, a Jewish agricultural colony was created in Sicily Island with the support of the Am Olam organization and the Hebrew Emigrant Aid Society. The colony was mostly made up of immigrants from Yelisavetgrad who were fleeing the pogroms that began that same year. By 1882, the colony was completely disbanded as the Mississippi River flooded, destroying most farms.

== Demographics ==
Historical population
Census	Pop.	Note	%±
1960	761		—
1970	630		−17.2%
1980	691		9.7%
1990	421		−39.1%
2000	453		7.6%
2010	526		16.1%
2020	366		−30.4%
2025 (est.)	330	▼	−9.8%
U.S. Decennial Census

=== 2020 census ===
Sicily Island, Louisiana – Racial and ethnic composition Note: the US Census treats Hispanic/Latino as an ethnic category. This table excludes Latinos from the racial categories and assigns them to a separate category. Hispanics/Latinos may be of any race.
Race / Ethnicity (NH = Non-Hispanic)	Pop 2000	Pop 2010	Pop 2020	% 2000	% 2010	% 2020
White alone (NH)	203	180	96	44.81%	34.22%	26.23%
Black or African American alone (NH)	245	336	251	54.08%	63.88%	68.58%
Native American or Alaska Native alone (NH)	0	0	2	0.00%	0.00%	0.55%
Asian alone (NH)	0	1	0	0.00%	0.19%	0.00%
Pacific Islander alone (NH)	0	0	0	0.00%	0.00%	0.00%
Other Race alone (NH)	0	0	4	0.00%	0.00%	1.09%
Mixed race or Multiracial (NH)	1	7	10	0.22%	1.33%	2.73%
Hispanic or Latino (any race)	4	2	3	0.88%	0.38%	0.82%
Total	453	526	366	100.00%	100.00%	100.00%

=== 2000 census ===
As of the census of 2000, there were 453 people, 197 households, and 110 families residing in the village. The population density was 790.4 inhabitants per square mile (305.2/km^{2}). There were 245 housing units at an average density of 427.5 per square mile (165.1/km^{2}). The racial makeup of the village was 44.81% White, 54.53% African American, 0.22% from other races, and 0.44% from two or more races. Hispanic or Latino of any race were 0.88% of the population.

There were 197 households, out of which 27.4% had children under the age of 18 living with them, 34.0% were married couples living together, 19.8% had a female householder with no husband present, and 43.7% were non-families. 41.1% of all households were made up of individuals, and 21.3% had someone living alone who was 65 years of age or older. The average household size was 2.30 and the average family size was 3.23.

In the village, the population was spread out, with 30.0% under the age of 18, 7.1% from 18 to 24, 26.5% from 25 to 44, 20.3% from 45 to 64, and 16.1% who were 65 years of age or older. The median age was 36 years. For every 100 females, there were 81.9 males. For every 100 females age 18 and over, there were 82.2 males.

The median income for a household in the village was $14,783, and the median income for a family was $23,036. Males had a median income of $25,750 versus $14,821 for females. The per capita income for the village was $11,972. About 45.5% of families and 47.1% of the population were below the poverty line, including 61.6% of those under age 18 and 12.1% of those age 65 or over.

== Notable people ==
- Joe Raymond Peace, football coach
- William S. Peck, Sr., member of the Louisiana House from 1920 to 1928
- Sonny Simmons, jazz musician, born in Sicily Island in 1933

== Photo gallery ==
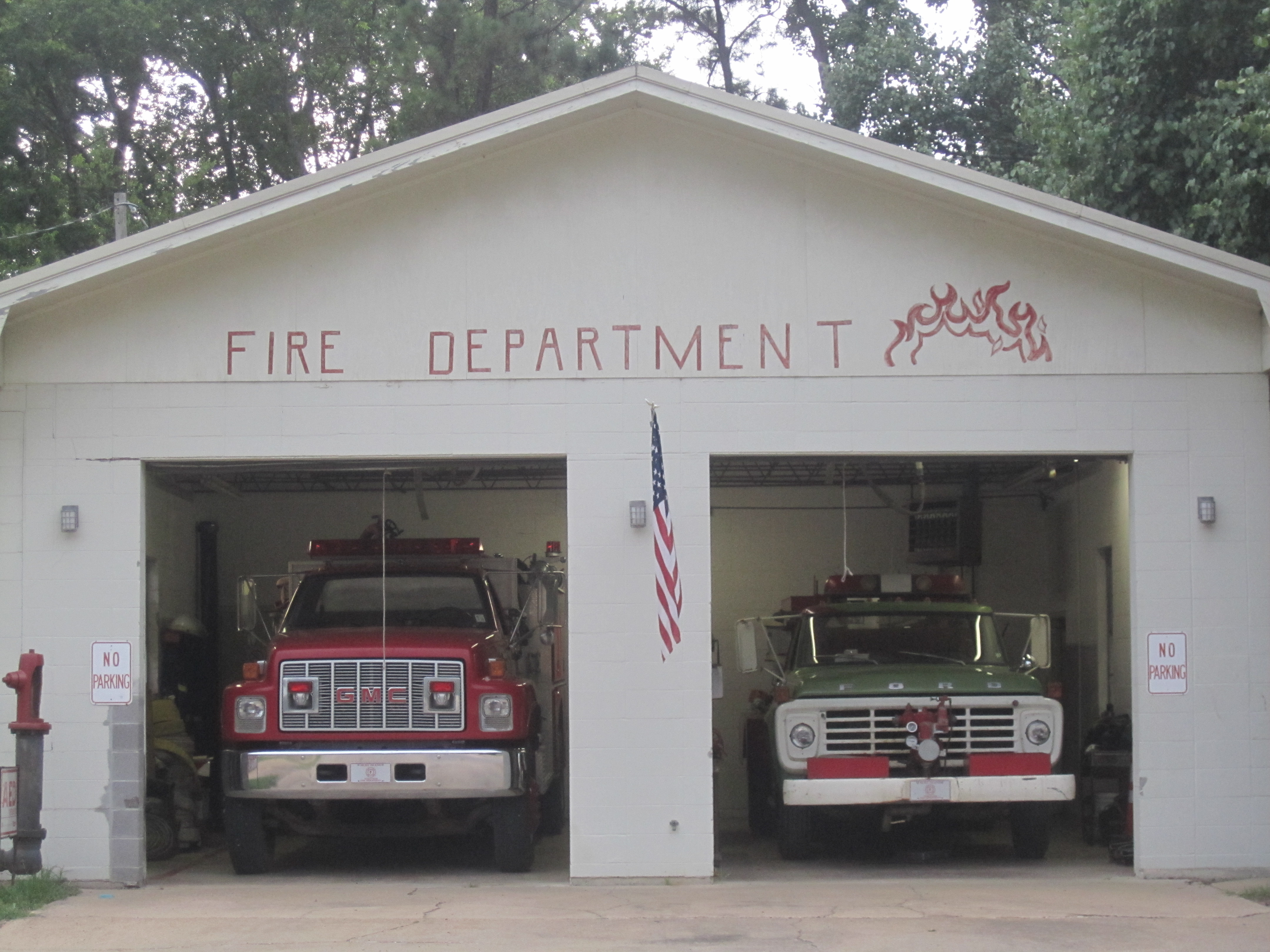
Sicily Island Fire Department

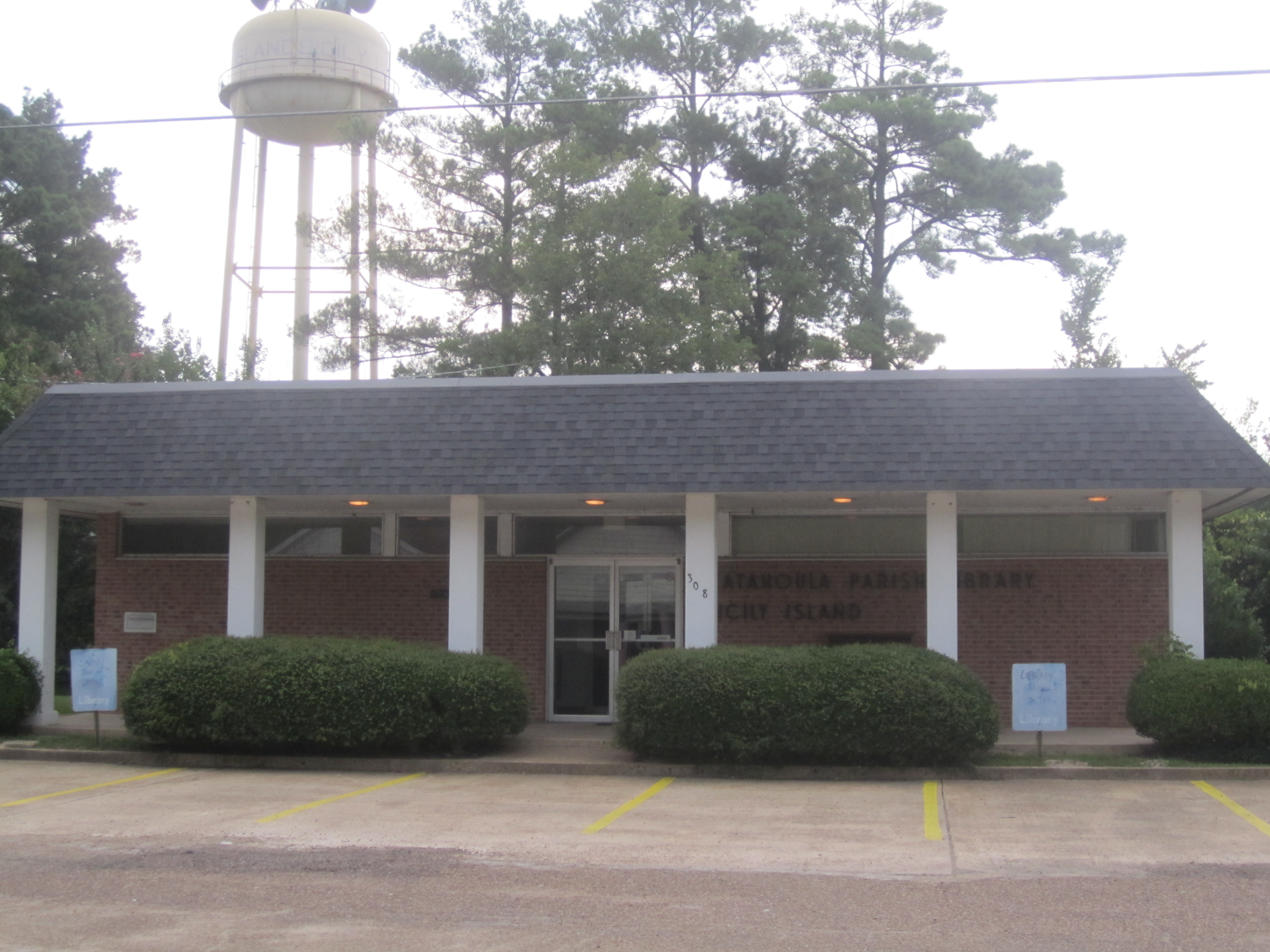
Catahoula Parish branch library in Sicily Island

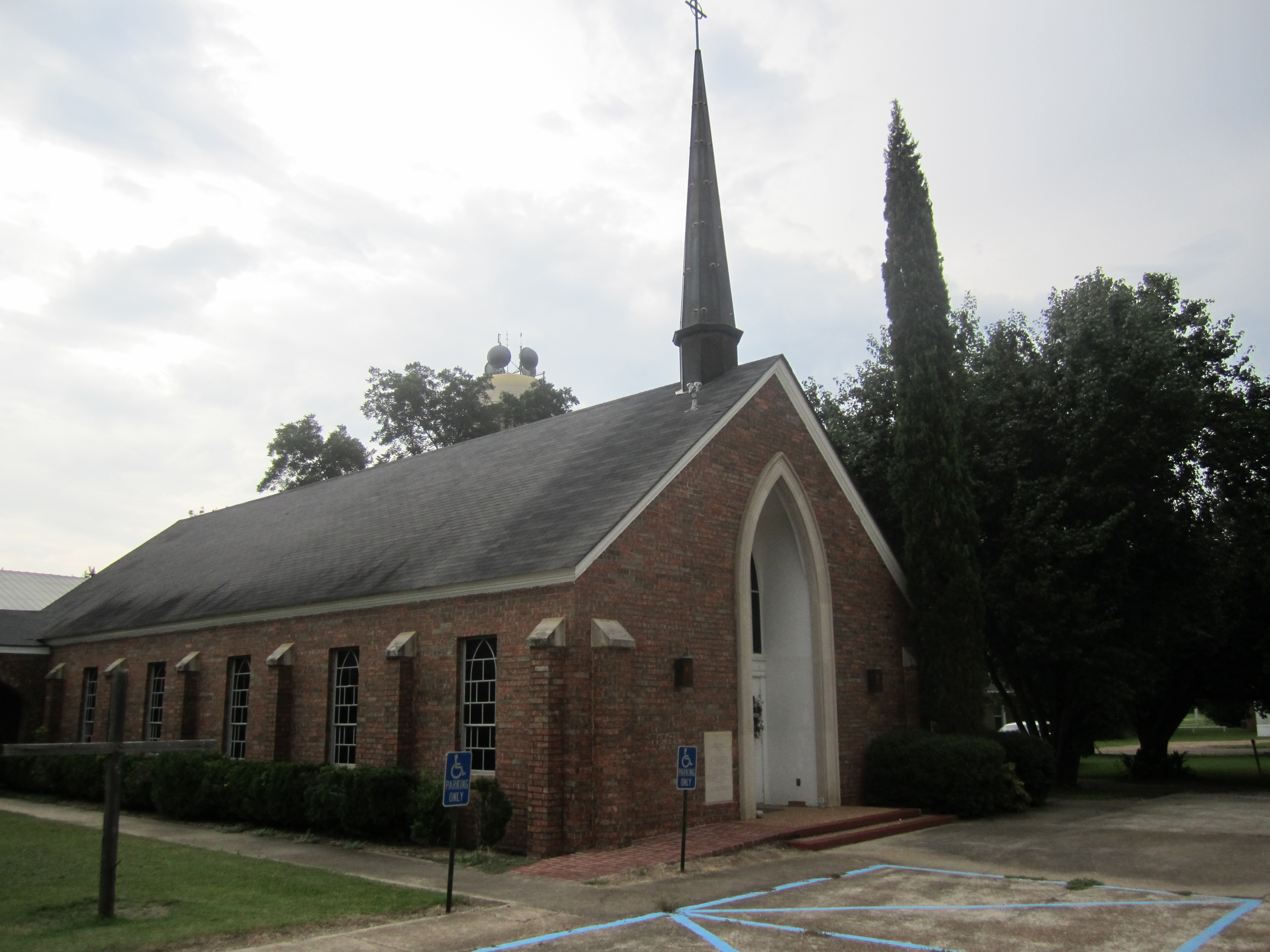
Sicily Island United Methodist Church

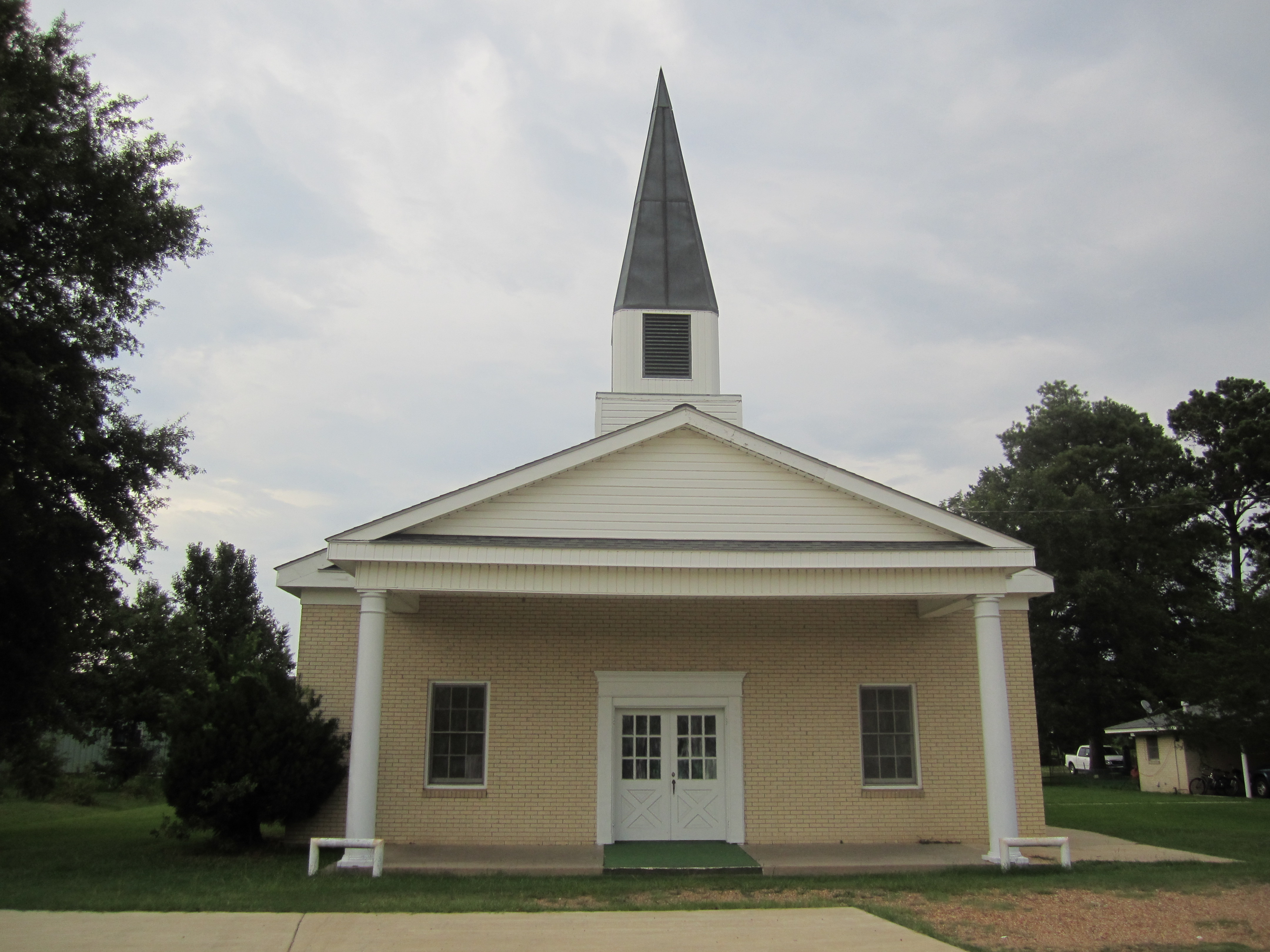
First Baptist Church in Sicily Island

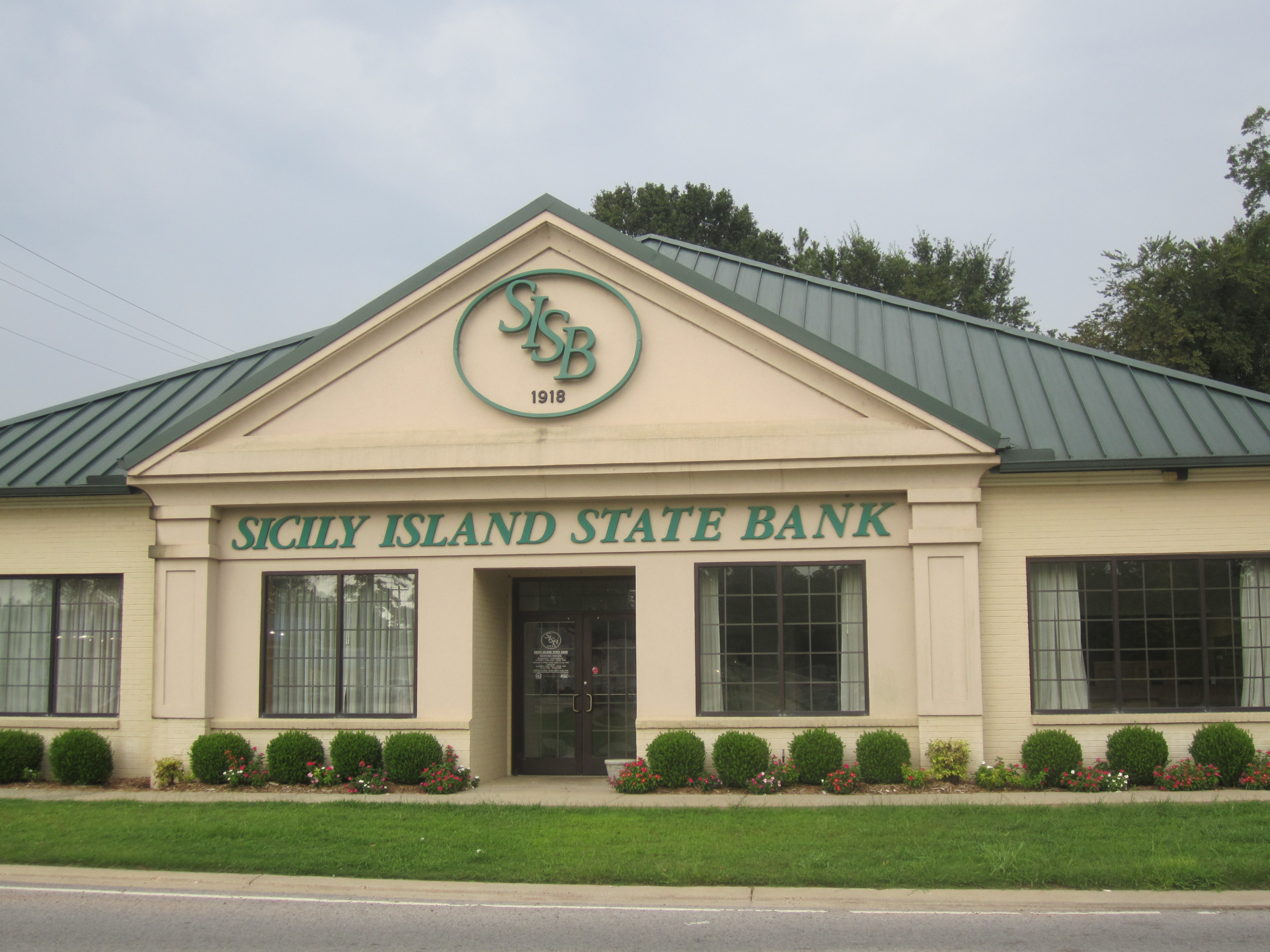
Sicily Island State Bank
