= Ouachita River =

River in Arkansas and Louisiana, United States

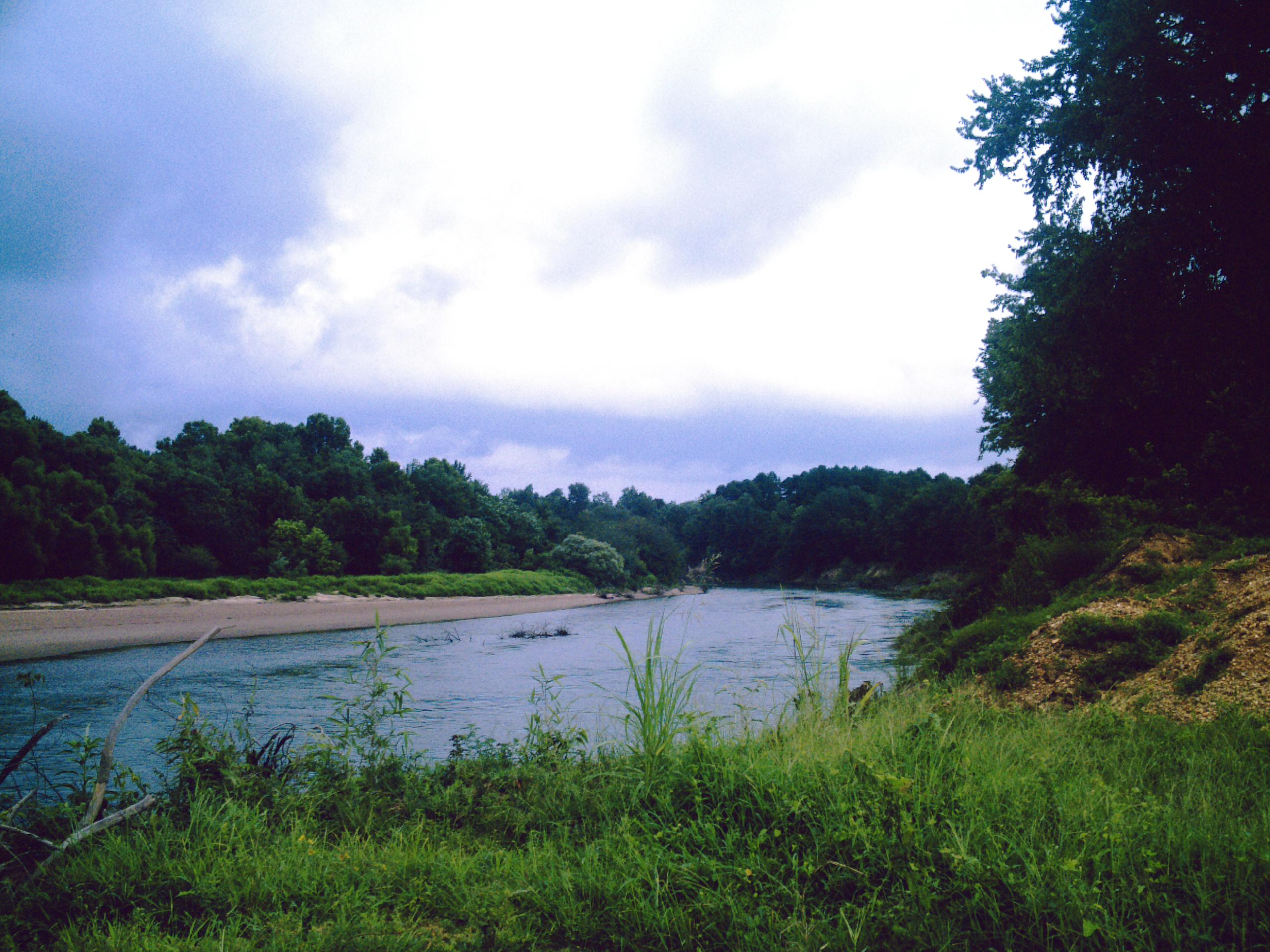
- Ouachita River in Ouachita County, Arkansas
- The Ouachita River. Its southern terminus is the confluence with the Tensas River near Jonesville, Louisiana to form the Black River (Louisiana).

Location
- Country: United States
- States: Arkansas; Louisiana
- Counties: Polk; Montgomery; Garland; Hot Spring; Clark; Dallas; Ouachita; Calhoun; Union; Bradley; Ashley
- Parishes: Union; Morehouse; Ouachita; Caldwell; Catahoula

Physical characteristics
- Source
  - location: Ouachita Mountains, Polk County, Arkansas
  - coordinates: 34°41′56″N 94°19′57″W
- Mouth: Black River
  - location: Catahoula Parish, near Jonesville, Louisiana
  - coordinates: 31°37′53″N 91°48′25″W
- Length: 605 mi (974 km)
- Discharge
  - location: West Monroe, Louisiana (includes Boeuf River)
  - average: 24,262 cu/ft. per sec.

Basin features
- Cities: Hot Springs, Arkansas; Camden, Arkansas; Monroe, Louisiana; West Monroe, Louisiana
- Tributaries
  - left: Little Missouri; Saline; Tensas
  - right: Caddo; Little

The Ouachita River (/ˈwɑːʃɪtɑː/ WAH-shi-tah) is a 605-mile-long (974 km) river that runs south and east through the U.S. states of Arkansas and Louisiana, joining the Tensas River to form the Black River near Jonesville, Louisiana. It is the 25th-longest river in the United States (by main stem).

== Course ==
The Ouachita River begins in the Ouachita Mountains near Mena, Arkansas. It flows east into Lake Ouachita, a reservoir created by Blakely Mountain Dam. The North Fork and South Fork of the Ouachita flow into Lake Ouachita to join the main stream. Portions of the river in this region flow through the Ouachita National Forest. From the lake, the Ouachita flows south into Lake Hamilton, a reservoir created by Carpenter Dam, named after Flavius Josephus Carpenter. The city of Hot Springs lies on the north side of Lake Hamilton. Another reservoir, Lake Catherine, impounds the Ouachita just below Lake Hamilton. Below Lake Catherine, the river flows free through most of the rest of Arkansas.

Just below Lake Catherine, the river bends south near Malvern, and collects the Caddo River near Arkadelphia. Downstream, the Little Missouri River joins the Ouachita. After passing the city of Camden, shortly downstream from where dredging for navigational purposes begins, the river collects the waters of Smackover Creek and later the Ouachita's main tributary, the Saline River. South of the Saline, the Ouachita flows into Lake Jack Lee, a reservoir created by the Ouachita and Black River Project, just north of the Louisiana state line. The Felsenthal National Wildlife Refuge encompasses the Ouachita from the Saline River to Lake Jack Lee's mouth.

Below Lake Jack Lee, the Ouachita continues south into Louisiana. The river flows generally south through the state, collecting the tributary waters of Bayou Bartholomew, Bayou de Loutre, Bayou d'Arbonne, the Boeuf River, and the Tensas River.

The Ouachita has five locks and dams along its length, located at Camden, Calion, and Felsenthal, Arkansas, and in Columbia and Jonesville, Louisiana.

=== Black River ===
Black River

After the Ouachita River’s junction with the Tensas at 31°16′22″N 91°50′01″W, the resulting joined river is called the Black River and flows for 41.6 miles (66.9 km) in Catahoula and Concordia parishes until it joins the Red River, which flows into the Atchafalaya River.

== History ==
The river is named for the Native American Ouachita tribe, one of several historic tribes who lived along it. Others included the Caddo, Osage Nation, Taensa, Chickasaw, and Choctaw. The historian Muriel Hazel Wright suggested that word Ouachita owa chito is a Choctaw phrase meaning "hunt big" or "good hunting grounds".

Before the rise of the historic tribes, their indigenous ancestors had lived along the river for thousands of years. In the Lower Mississippi Valley, they began building monumental earthwork mounds in the Middle Archaic period (6000–2000 BC in Louisiana). The earliest construction was Watson Brake, an 11-mound complex built about 3500 BC by hunter gatherers in present-day Louisiana. The discovery and dating of several such early sites in northern Louisiana has changed the traditional model, which associated mound building with sedentary, agricultural societies, but these cultures did not develop for thousands of years.

The largest such prehistoric mound was destroyed in the 20th century during construction of a bridge at Jonesville, Louisiana. Likely built by the Mississippian culture, which rose about 1000 AD on the Mississippi and its tributaries, this mound was reported in use as late as 1540 by the Spanish explorer Hernando de Soto. On his expedition through this area, he encountered Indians occupying the site. A lightning strike destroyed the temple on the mound that year, which was seen as a bad omen by the tribe. They never rebuilt the temple, and were recorded as abandoning the site in 1736.

After the Louisiana purchase, Arkansas became a part of the U.S. and the Dunbar and Hunter Expedition was commissioned to explore Arkansas which included the length of the Ouachita River from the mouth to Hot Springs.

The Ouachita River was a route used in the Trail of Tears. Native Americans were transported along the river to Camden, Arkansas and from there they walked the rest of the way to Oklahoma.

The river was an important factor in settling the region because it provided access to larger markets for cotton and other goods. Nowadays the river still transports goods however to a lesser extent than before and many of its natural areas are preserved.

=== Land speculators ===
During the late 1700s, when the area was controlled by the Spanish and French, the river served as a route for early colonists, and for land speculators such as the self-styled Baron de Bastrop. The "Bastrop lands" later passed into the hands of another speculator, former Vice President Aaron Burr. He saw potential for big profits in the event of a war with Spain following the Louisiana Purchase. Burr and many of his associates were arrested for treason, before their band of armed settlers reached the Ouachita.

During the 1830s, the Ouachita River Valley attracted land speculators from New York and southeastern cities. Its rich soil and accessibility due to the country's elaborate river steamboat network made it desirable.

One of the investors from the east was Meriwether Lewis Randolph, the youngest grandson of Thomas Jefferson. He was building a home on the Ouachita River in what is now Clark County, Arkansas, when he died of malaria in 1837. He had been appointed Secretary of the Arkansas Territory by President Andrew Jackson in 1835, and had relinquished his commission when Arkansas became a state in 1836.

=== Steamboats, 1819 to 1890 ===
Steamboats operated on the Red River to Shreveport, Louisiana.

In April 1815, Captain Henry Miller Shreve was the first person to bring a steamboat, the Enterprise, up the Red River.

During the 1830s, farmers cultivated land for large cotton plantations; dependent on slave labor, cotton production supported new planter wealth in the ante-bellum years. Steamboats ran scheduled trips between Camden, Arkansas and New Orleans. A person could travel from any eastern city to the Ouachita River without touching land, except to transfer from one steamboat to another.

Trade using steamboats on the Ouachita River became an important part of the local economy and supported many of the communities along the river.

In the late 1830s, the steamboats in rivers on the west side of the Mississippi River were a long, wide, shallow draft vessel, lightly built with an engine on the deck. These newer steamboats could sail in just 20 inches of water. Contemporaries claimed that they could "run with a lot of heavy dew".

In 1881 a snagboat was employed on the river and a boat for dredging in the shoals to the amount of $141,879.24. Earlier plans had called for the construction of locks and dams.

=== Navigation ===
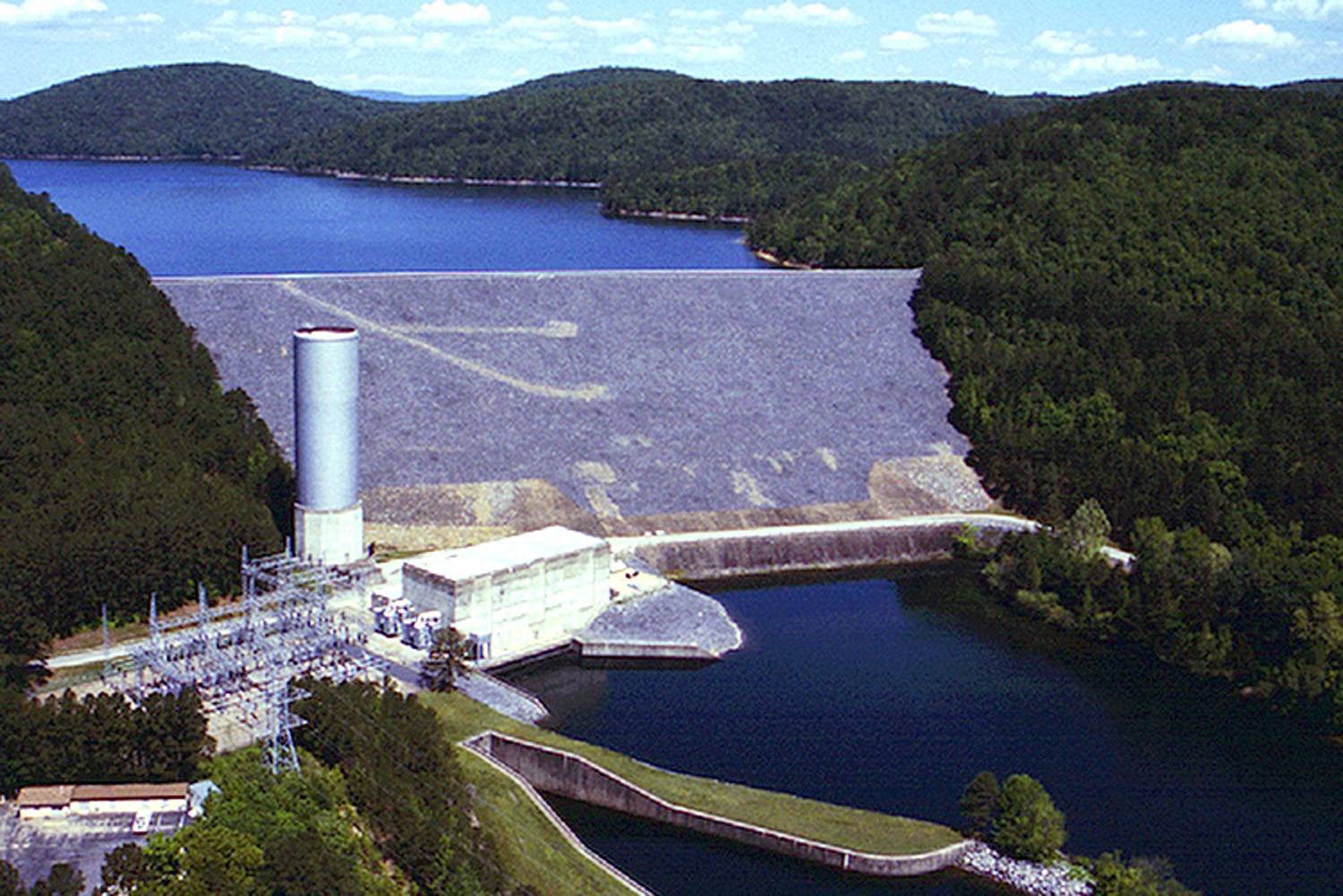
Blakely Mountain Dam on the Ouachita River in Garland County, Arkansas. The dam impounds Lake Ouachita.

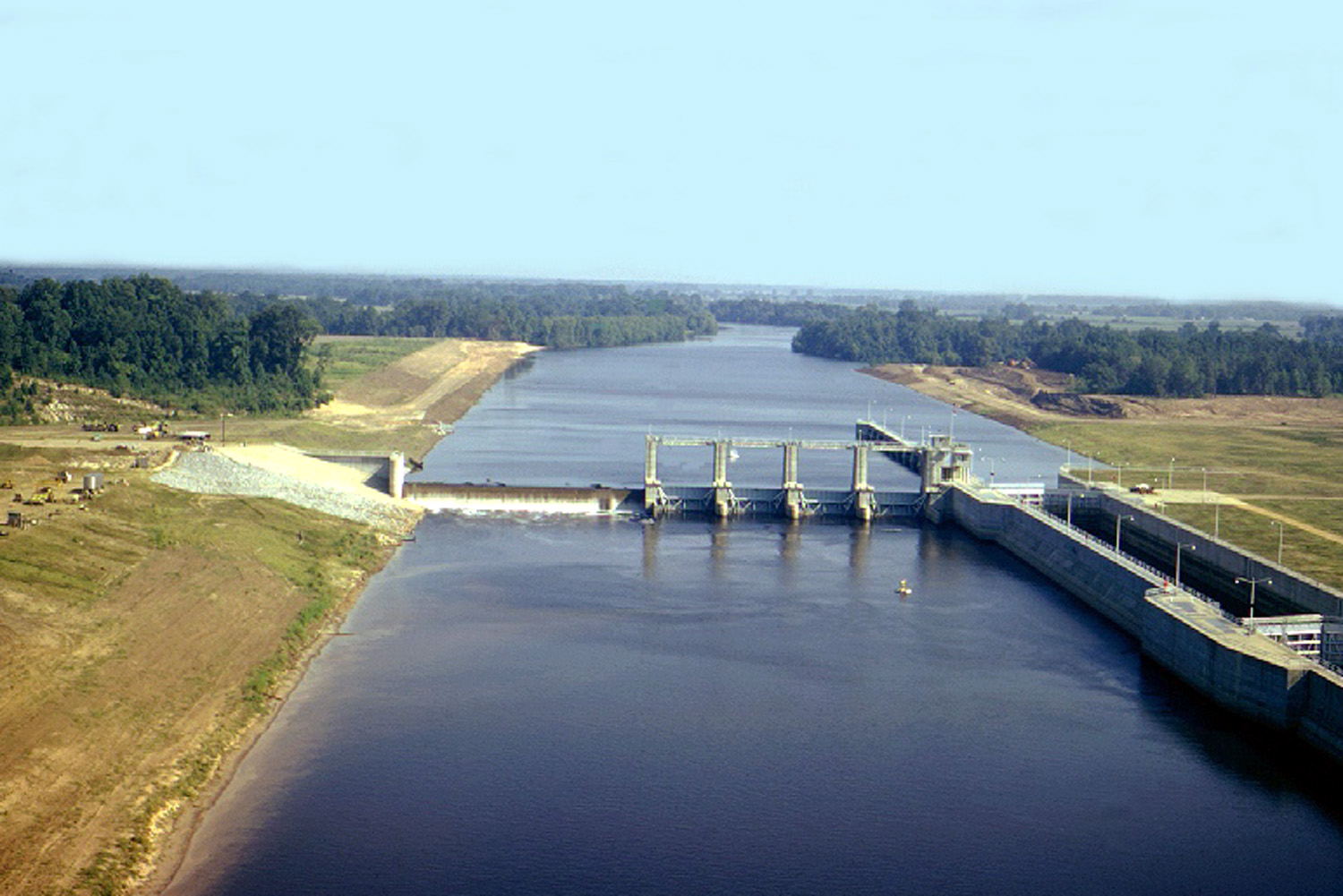
Columbia Lock and Dam on the Ouachita River

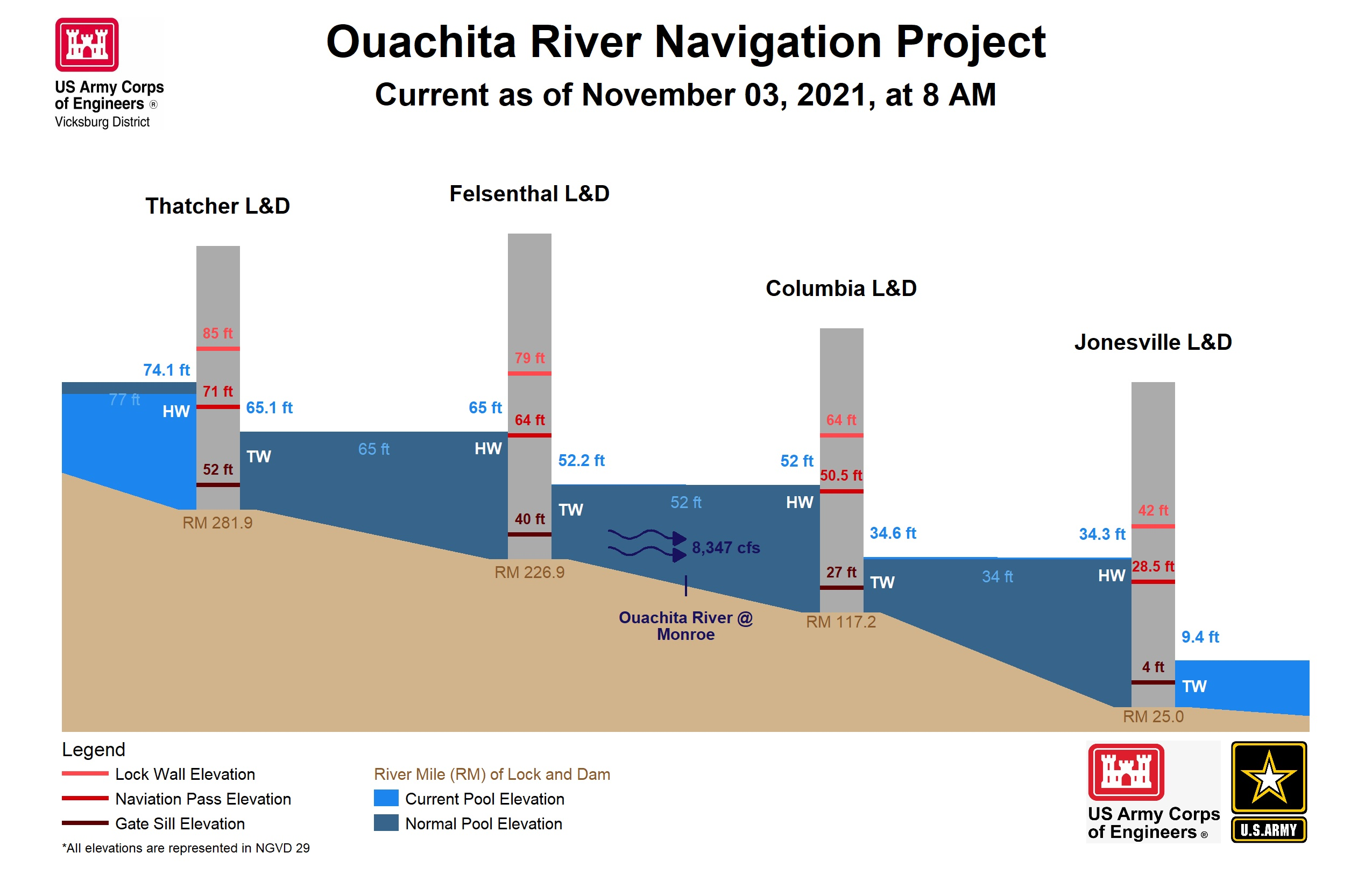
Ouachita River Navigation Project by the U.S. Army Corps of Engineers

A 337-mile-long "Ouachita–Black Rivers Navigation Project" began in 1902, to create a navigable waterway from Camden, Arkansas to Jonesville, Louisiana, and when completed in 1924 included six locks and dams that were 84 feet wide and 600 feet in length, having from 3 to 5 tainter gates. Including the Black River the total navigable length is 351 miles. The Ouachita-Black Rivers Navigation Project has less than a million tons of shipping annually which has the likely prospect of the future withdrawal of federal support. The project's system of dams and locks enhances the river's recreational use and regional water supply.

==== Floods ====
===== Flood of 1882 =====
The Ouachita River reached a historic flood stage crest with a river gauge reading at Camden, Arkansas of 46 feet on May 12, 1882.

===== Flood of 1927 =====
In Monroe, Louisiana during a flood on May 4, 1927 the high water mark on river gage reading was 48.6 feet.

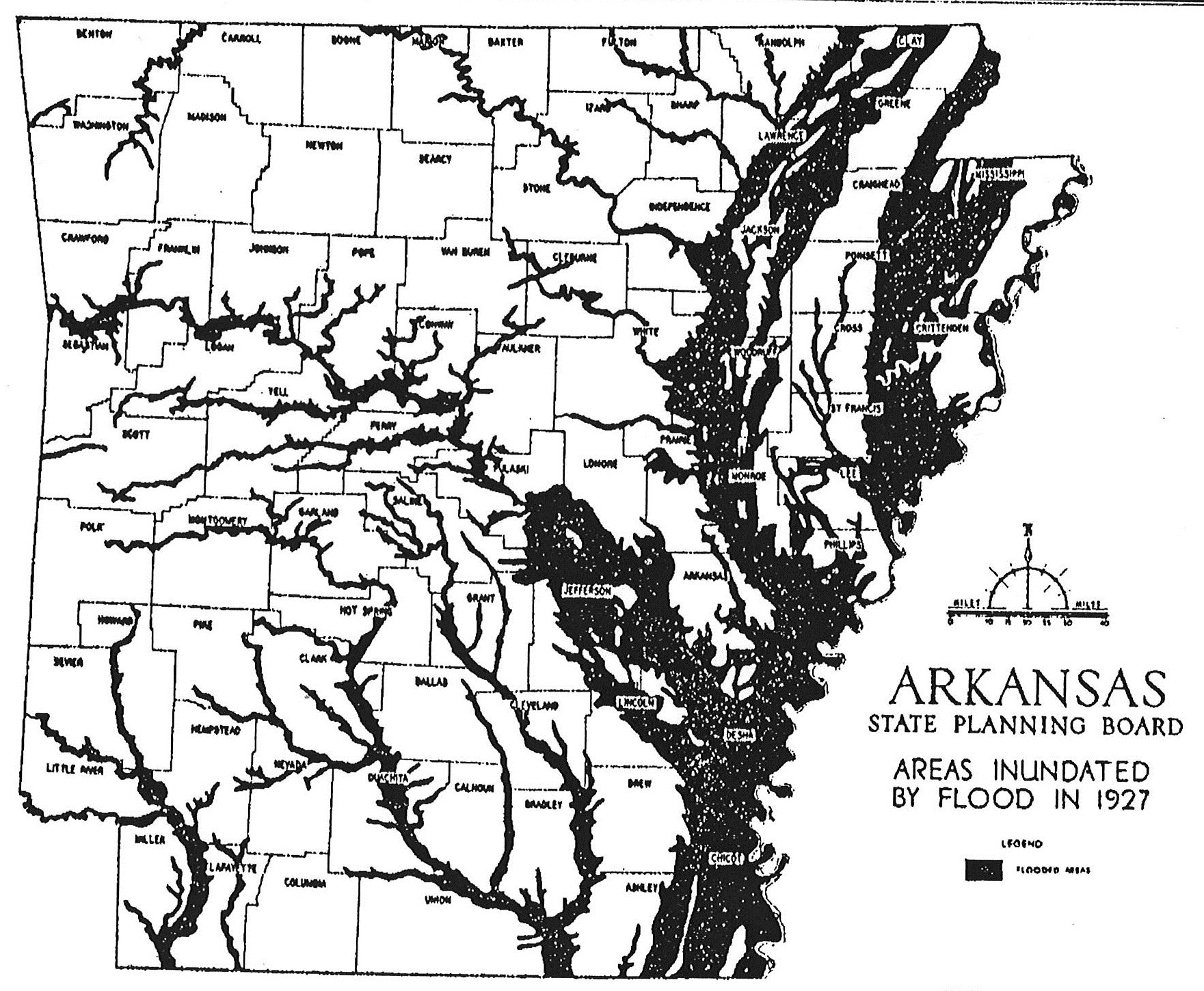
Flood of 1927 in Arkansas.

Great Mississippi Flood of 1927 flooded the areas along the Ouachita Rivers along with many other rivers.

===== Flood of 1932 =====
In February 1932, the Ouachita River rose 1.5 feet higher than the May 4, 1927 flood. The annual high water mark on river gage readings were 48.6 in 1927 and 49.7 in 1932.

===== Flood of 1968 =====
The Ouachita River reached flood stage crest with a river gauge reading at Camden, Arkansas of 43.08 feet on May 17, 1968.

===== Flood of 2018 =====
The Ouachita River reached flood stage crest at 85.43 feet above sea level, about 20 feet above the normal water level of 65 feet at the Felsenthal lock and dam on March 11, 2018. The highest water level ever recorded at Felsenthal was 88.3 feet in 1945.

== Natural history ==
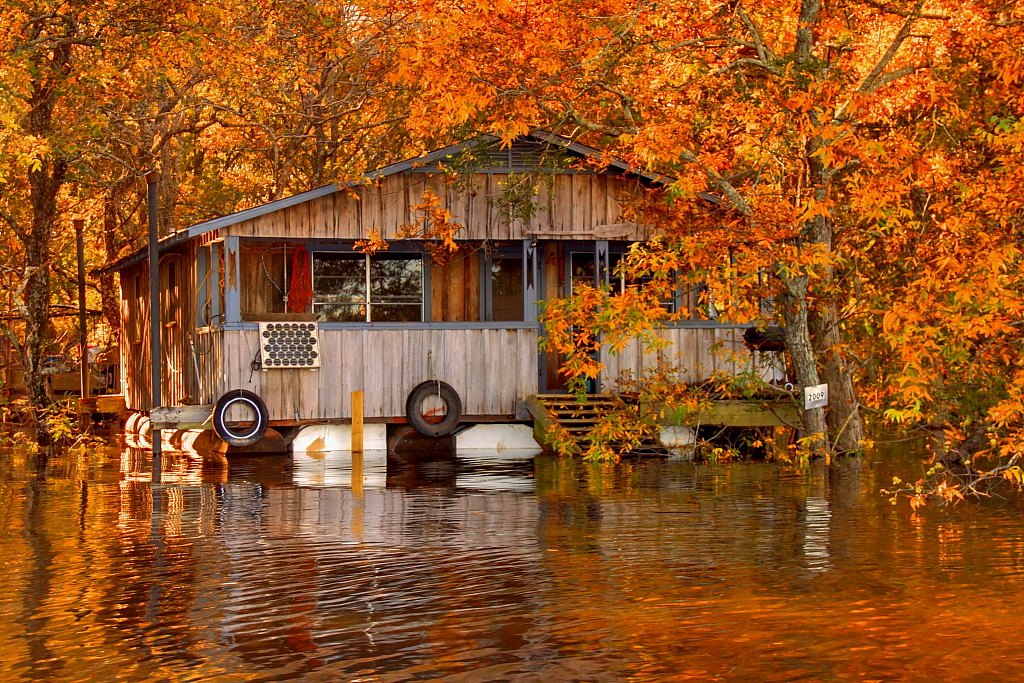
A floating camp on the Ouachita River in Louisiana

The river continues to be utilized for commercial navigation on a smaller scale than during its "steamboat" days. It is fed by numerous small creeks containing endemic native fish such as killifish. Fishing remains popular in the river for black bass, white bass, bream, freshwater drum, and gar. Concerns about airborne mercury contamination in some areas discourage consumption of the fish for food. Fishing for rainbow trout is popular in the tailwaters of Lakes Ouachita, Hamilton and Catherine in and around Hot Springs, Arkansas.

The river is commercially navigable from Camden, Arkansas, to its terminal point in Jonesville in Catahoula Parish in eastern Louisiana. Upstream of Camden, the river receives substantial recreational use.

The Ouachita is lined for most of its length with deep woods, including substantial wetlands. It has a scenic quality representative of the southwestern Arkansas and northern Louisiana region.

== Lists ==
Major towns along the river are:

- Hot Springs, Arkansas
- Malvern, Arkansas
- Arkadelphia, Arkansas
- Camden, Arkansas
- Sterlington, Louisiana
- Monroe, Louisiana
- West Monroe, Louisiana
- Columbia, Louisiana
- Harrisonburg, Louisiana
- Jonesville, Louisiana

== See also ==
- List of Arkansas rivers
- List of Louisiana rivers
- List of longest rivers of the United States (by main stem)
