= List of highways numbered 116 =

Route 116 or Highway 116 can refer to multiple roads:

== Brazil ==
- BR-116

== Canada ==
- New Brunswick Route 116
- Prince Edward Island Route 116
- Quebec Route 116

== Costa Rica ==
- National Route 116

== Cuba ==
- Jaguey Grande–Playa Giron Road (3–116)

== India ==
- National Highway 116 (India)

== Japan ==
- Route 116 (Japan)

== United Kingdom ==
- A116 road

== United States ==
- U.S. Route 116 (former)
  - U.S. Route 116 (Wisconsin) (former proposal)
- Alabama State Route 116
- Arkansas Highway 116
  - Arkansas Highway 116 (1927) (former)
- California State Route 116
- Colorado State Highway 116
- Connecticut Route 116
- Florida State Road 116
  - County Road 116 (Duval County, Florida)
- Georgia State Route 116
- Illinois Route 116
- Indiana State Road 116
- Iowa Highway 116
- K-116 (Kansas highway)
- Louisiana Highway 116
- Maine State Route 116
- Maryland Route 116 (former)
- Massachusetts Route 116
- M-116 (Michigan highway)
- Minnesota State Highway 116 (1934–1955) (former)
  - Minnesota State Highway 116 (1965–1976) (former)
- Missouri Route 116
- Nebraska Highway 116
- Nevada State Route 116
- New Hampshire Route 116
- County Route 116 (Bergen County, New Jersey)
- New Mexico State Road 116
- New York State Route 116
  - County Route 116 (Fulton County, New York)
    - County Route 116A (Fulton County, New York)
  - County Route 116 (Niagara County, New York)
  - County Route 116 (Rensselaer County, New York)
  - County Route 116 (Suffolk County, New York)
  - County Route 116 (Sullivan County, New York)
- North Carolina Highway 116
- Ohio State Route 116
- Oklahoma State Highway 116
- Pennsylvania Route 116
- Rhode Island Route 116
- South Carolina Highway 116
- South Dakota Highway 116 (former)
- Tennessee State Route 116
- Texas State Highway 116 (former)
  - Texas State Highway Loop 116
  - Texas State Highway Spur 116 (former)
  - Farm to Market Road 116
- Utah State Route 116
- Vermont Route 116
- Virginia State Route 116
  - Virginia State Route 116 (1923-1928) (former)
  - Virginia State Route 116 (1928-1930) (former)
  - Virginia State Route 116 (1930-1932) (former)
- Washington State Route 116
- Wisconsin Highway 116
- Wyoming Highway 116

Territories

- Puerto Rico Highway 116
  - Puerto Rico Highway 116R (former)

== See also ==
- A116
- D116 road
- List of national roads in Latvia § P116
- R116 road (Ireland)
- S116 (Amsterdam)

Preceded by 115	Lists of highways 116	Succeeded by 117
