= Louisiana Highway 28 =

State highway in Louisiana, United States

Louisiana Highway 28
- LA 28 in red, LA 28 Bus. in blue

Route information
- Maintained by Louisiana DOTD
- Length: 86.968 mi (139.961 km)
- Existed: 1955 renumbering–present
- Tourist routes: Louisiana Scenic Byways: Colonial Trails Scenic Byway

Major junctions
- West end: US 171 / LA 8 in Leesville
- US 71 / US 165 in Alexandria; I-49 / US 71 / US 165 in Alexandria; I-49 / US 167 in Alexandria; US 167 in Pineville
- East end: US 84 west of Jonesville

Location
- Country: United States
- State: Louisiana
- Parishes: Vernon, Rapides, La Salle, Catahoula

Highway system
- Louisiana State Highway System; Interstate; US; State; Scenic
← LA 27	→ LA 29

Louisiana Highway 28 (LA 28) is a state highway located in central Louisiana. It runs 86.97 miles (139.96 km) in an east–west direction from the junction of U.S. Highway 171 (US 171) and LA 8 in Leesville to US 84 west of Jonesville.

== Route description ==
From the west, LA 28 begins at a roundabout intersection with US 171, at the north city limits of Leesville in Vernon Parish, running concurrent with LA 8. LA 8 turns northeast about five miles (8.0 km) east of Leesville and is called the Slagle Road. The highway intersects with LA 121 then LA 465 and a few miles after this enters Rapides Parish then Gardner before entering Alexandria. Between Leesville and Alexandria LA 28 is known as the Alexandria Highway. In Alexandria LA 28 is called Coliseum Boulevard. LA 28 intersects with MacArthur Drive where signs direct traffic to merge with north MacArthur Drive and intersect and runs concurrent with Interstate 49. After merging onto MacArthur Drive BR LA 28 exits and follows through downtown Alexandria city streets. This was the original route until December 2007. LA 28 exits and merges with US 167 east at the Casson Street exit in Pineville and becomes a part of the Pineville Expressway, which proceeds west along the Fulton Street Bridge, named for Alexander Fulton, the founder of Alexandria. This bridge links LA 28 over the Red River between Pineville and Alexandria. LA 28 exits at Holloway Prairie Road and continues east. Shortly after intersecting with LA 115, LA 28 enters La Salle Parish. East of Walters, LA 28 enters Catahoula Parish. LA 28 terminates at US 84 between Jena and Jonesville.

Much of LA 28 is a four-lane divided highway with a 65 miles per hour (105 km/h) speed limit. East of Pineville, it is a two-lane undivided road to the eastern end at US 84.

== Future ==
The entire route of LA 28 is part of the High Priority Corridor 99 (Central Louisiana Corridor). Along this corridor, LA 28 will be upgraded to interstate standards and signed as I-14. A timeline for this has not been determined.

== Major intersections ==
Parish	Location	mi	km	Exit	Destinations	Notes
Vernon	Leesville	0.000– 0.090	0.000– 0.145		US 171 south / LA 8 west (North 5th Street, North 6th Street) – Leesville US 171 north (Shreveport Highway) – Shreveport	Western terminus; west end of LA 8 concurrency; roundabout
Vernon	Leesville	0.401	0.645		LA 117 north / LA 1213 south (Kurthwood Road) – Kurthwood, Hagewood	Southern terminus of LA 117; northern terminus of LA 1213
Vernon		4.280	6.888		LA 184 west (Chaffee Road) – Fort Johnson	Eastern terminus of LA 184
Vernon		5.285	8.505		LA 468 west (Slagle Road)	Eastern terminus of LA 468
Vernon		5.600	9.012		LA 8 east (Slagle Road) – Slagle	East end of LA 8 concurrency
Vernon		6.489	10.443		LA 469 (North Fort Road) – Fort Johnson	
Vernon		12.888	20.741		LA 121 north – Slagle	West end of LA 121 concurrency
Vernon		12.982	20.893		LA 121 south – Hineston	East end of LA 121 concurrency
Vernon		22.757	36.624		LA 465 – Simpson, Sieper, Hineston	
Rapides	Gardner	35.590	57.277		LA 121 – Hot Wells, Boyce, Hineston	
Rapides	Alexandria	45.255	72.831		LA 1243 (McKeithen Drive)	Northern terminus of LA 1243
Rapides	Alexandria	45.427	73.108		LA 3054 (Vandenburg Drive) – England Airpark, Alexandria International Airport	Southern terminus of LA 3054
Rapides	Alexandria	48.352– 48.675	77.815– 78.335		US 71 south / US 165 south (MacArthur Drive) LA 28 Bus. east (Monroe Street)	West end of US 71/US 165 concurrency; western terminus of LA 28 Bus.
Rapides	Alexandria	48.883	78.670		LA 496 west (Bayou Rapides Road)	Eastern terminus of LA 496
Rapides	Alexandria	49.265	79.284		LA 498 west (England Drive)	Eastern terminus of LA 498; access via frontage road
Rapides	Alexandria	49.410– 50.079	79.518– 80.594	70	US 165 Bus. north / LA 1 (North Bolton Avenue) – Boyce, Marksville	West end of freeway; southern terminus of US 165 Bus.
Rapides	Alexandria	50.163– 51.047	80.730– 82.152	71; 86	US 71 north / US 165 north I-49 north – Shreveport	East end of US 71/US 165 concurrency; west end of I-49 concurrency
Rapides	Alexandria	51.073– 52.408	82.194– 84.343	85A	To LA 1 / Elliott Street – Downtown Alexandria (eastbound); M.L. King Drive – Downtown Alexandria (westbound)	
Rapides	Alexandria	51.727– 51.805	83.247– 83.372	85B	Monroe Street / Medical Center Drive	Eastbound entrance and westbound exit
Rapides	Alexandria	51.825– 52.500	83.404– 84.491	84	I-49 south / US 167 south – Opelousas, Lafayette	East end of I-49 concurrency; west end of US 167 concurrency
Rapides	Alexandria	52.700– 52.780	84.812– 84.941		LA 1 / LA 28 Bus. west – Downtown Alexandria To US 167 Bus. south (not signed)	Northern terminus of US 167 Bus.; eastern terminus of LA 28 Bus.; eastbound entrance and westbound exit
Rapides	Alexandria–Pineville line	52.811– 53.019	84.991– 85.326	Purple Heart Memorial Bridge over Red River		
Rapides	Pineville	53.069– 53.596	85.406– 86.254		LA 1250 (Shamrock Street) – Downtown Pineville	Via LA 1250 Spur; southern terminus of LA 1250 Spur
Rapides	Pineville	54.008– 54.204	86.917– 87.233		LA 107 – Marksville; LA 1250 (Shamrock Street)	Northern terminus of LA 107; eastern terminus of LA 1250
Rapides	Pineville	54.741– 55.041	88.097– 88.580		US 167 north (Pineville Expressway) – Winnfield LA 3100 west (Griffith Street) – Pineville	East end of freeway and US 167 concurrency; eastern terminus of LA 3100
Rapides	Pineville	55.945	90.035		LA 3144 west (Edgewood Drive)	Eastern terminus of LA 3144
Rapides	Libuse	59.921	96.434		LA 3128	Northern terminus of LA 3128
Rapides	Libuse	60.208	96.895		LA 1205 (Philadelphia Road)	Western terminus of LA 1205
Rapides		62.558	100.677		LA 116 west (Esler Field Road) – Esler Air Field, Louisiana National Guard Training Center Pineville	Eastern terminus of LA 116
Rapides	Holloway	66.827	107.548		LA 1207	Western terminus of LA 1207
Rapides		71.614– 71.711	115.252– 115.408		LA 115 south – Marksville	Northern terminus of LA 115
La Salle		76.504– 76.591	123.121– 123.261	Bridge over Catahoula Lake Diversion Canal		
Catahoula	Archie	86.923– 86.968	139.889– 139.961		US 84 – Jonesville, Jena	Eastern terminus; to Catahoula National Wildlife Refuge
1.000 mi = 1.609 km; 1.000 km = 0.621 mi: Concurrency terminus; Incomplete access

== Business route ==
Louisiana Highway 28 Business
- Location: Alexandria
- Length: 2.941 mi (4.733 km)
- Existed: 2002–present

Louisiana Highway 28 Business (LA 28 Bus.) runs 2.94 miles (4.73 km) in a general east–west direction in the city of Alexandria. It travels along the former alignment of mainline LA 28, which has been moved onto I-49 through the downtown area.

LA 28 Bus. travels along a series of undivided two-lane city streets. From the west, the route begins on Monroe Street from its intersection with MacArthur Drive. At Bolton Avenue (US 165 Bus./LA 1), LA 28 Bus. turns southeast and proceeds to an intersection with US 167 Bus. (Mason/Overton Streets). LA 28 Bus. turns northeast with US 167 Bus. and LA 1 and travels under I-49. It then transitions onto the frontage roads alongside the elevated mainline route of US 167/LA 28 (Pineville Expressway). Both business routes take the entrance ramps to rejoin the mainline routes, which proceed ahead across the Red River bridge.

Major intersections
The entire highway is in Alexandria, Rapides Parish.

mi	km	Destinations	Notes
0.000	0.000	US 71 / US 165 / LA 28 east (MacArthur Drive) LA 28 west (Coliseum Boulevard) – Fort Johnson, Leesville	Western terminus
1.361	2.190	US 165 Bus. south / LA 1 north (Bolton Avenue) – Shreveport	West end of US 165 Bus. and LA 1 concurrencies
1.732	2.787	US 165 Bus. north / LA 1208-3 (Jackson Street) to I-49	Northern terminus of LA 1208-3; east end of US 165 Bus. concurrency
2.099– 2.134	3.378– 3.434	US 167 Bus. south (Mason Street, Overton Street)	West end of US 167 Bus. concurrency; one-way pair
2.509– 2.523	4.038– 4.060	I-49 south / US 167 south – Opelousas, Lafayette	Exit 84 on I-49; eastbound entrance and westbound exit
2.632– 2.941	4.236– 4.733	US 167 north / LA 28 east (Pineville Expressway) LA 1 south (Casson Street, Foisy Street) – Marksville US 167 Bus. (not signed)	Eastern terminus of LA 28 Bus.; northern terminus of US 167 Bus.; east end of US 167 Bus. and LA 1 concurrencies
1.000 mi = 1.609 km; 1.000 km = 0.621 mi
