= List of highways numbered 115 =

The following highways are numbered 115:

== Canada ==
- New Brunswick Route 115
- Ontario Highway 115
- Prince Edward Island Route 115
- Winnipeg Route 115

== Costa Rica ==
- National Route 115

== Germany ==
- Bundesautobahn 115

== India ==
- National Highway 115 (India)

== Italy ==
- State road 115

== Japan ==
- Route 115 (Japan)

== Philippines ==
- N115 highway (Philippines)

== United States ==
- Interstate 115
- Alabama State Route 115
  - County Route 115 (Lee County, Alabama)
- Arkansas Highway 115
- Arkansas Highway 115 (former)
- California State Route 115
- Colorado State Highway 115
- Connecticut Route 115
- Florida State Road 115
  - County Road 115A (Duval County, Florida)
  - County Road 115C (Duval County, Florida)
- Georgia State Route 115
- Illinois Route 115
- Indiana State Road 115
- Iowa Highway 115 (former)
- K-115 (Kansas highway)
- Kentucky Route 115
- Louisiana Highway 115
- Maine State Route 115
- Maryland Route 115
- Massachusetts Route 115
- M-115 (Michigan highway)
- Minnesota State Highway 115
- Missouri Route 115
- Nevada State Route 115
- New Hampshire Route 115
  - New Hampshire Route 115A
- County Route 115 (Bergen County, New Jersey)
- New Mexico State Road 115
- New York State Route 115
  - County Route 115 (Cortland County, New York)
  - County Route 115 (Erie County, New York)
  - County Route 115 (Onondaga County, New York)
  - County Route 115 (Steuben County, New York)
  - County Route 115 (Suffolk County, New York)
  - County Route 115 (Sullivan County, New York)
  - County Route 115 (Tompkins County, New York)
    - County Route 115M (Tompkins County, New York)
- North Carolina Highway 115
- Ohio State Route 115
- Oklahoma State Highway 115
- Pennsylvania Route 115
- Rhode Island Route 115
- South Dakota Highway 115
- Tennessee State Route 115
- Texas State Highway 115
  - Texas State Highway Spur 115
    - Texas State Highway Spur 115 (1940–1942) (former)
  - Farm to Market Road 115
- Utah State Route 115
- Vermont Route 115 (former)
- Virginia State Route 115
  - Virginia State Route 115 (1923-1928) (former)
  - Virginia State Route 115 (1928-1933) (former)
- Washington State Route 115
- West Virginia Route 115
- Wisconsin Highway 115

Territories

- Puerto Rico Highway 115
  - Puerto Rico Highway 115R (former)

== See also ==
- A115
- D115 road
- P115
- R115 road (Ireland)
- S115 (Amsterdam)

Preceded by 114	Lists of highways 115	Succeeded by 116
