= Bolpur =

Municipality in West Bengal, India

- City and Municipality
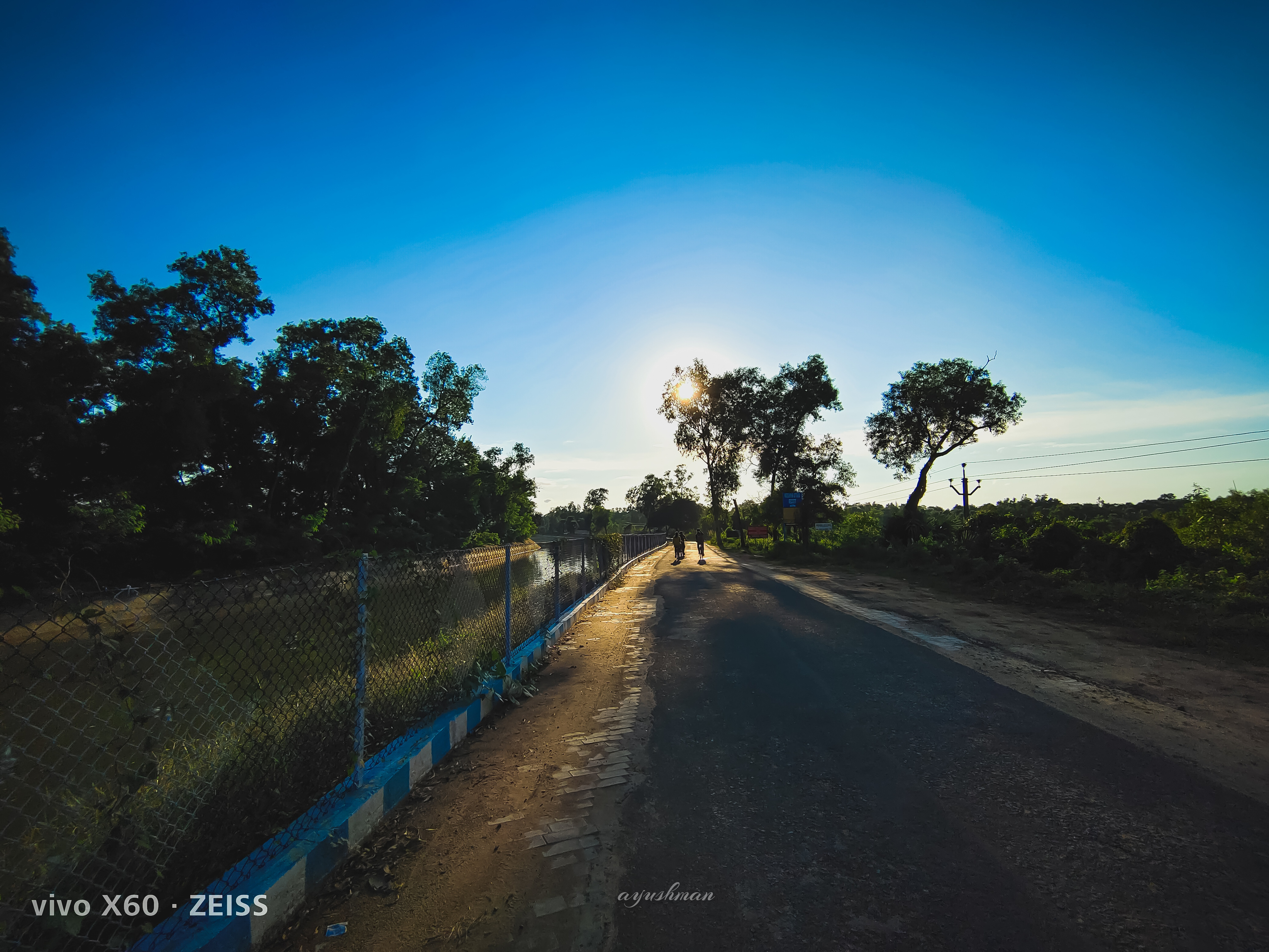
- Khoai Road

- Location in West Bengal, India Bolpur (India)
- Coordinates: 23.67°N 87.72°E
- Country: India
- State: West Bengal
- District: Birbhum
- Subdivision: Bolpur subdivision

Government
  - Type: Municipality
  - Body: Bolpur Municipality; Sriniketan Santiniketan Development Authority (SSDA)
  - Chairperson: Parna Ghosh

Area
  - City and Municipality: 33.45 km^{2} (12.92 sq mi)
  - Metro: 106.28 km^{2} (41.03 sq mi)
- Elevation: 58 m (190 ft)

Population (2011)
  - City and Municipality: 112,591
  - Density: 3,366/km^{2} (8,718/sq mi)
- Demonym: Bolpurbashi or Santiniketanbashi

Languages
  - Official: Bengali
  - Additional official: English
- Time zone: UTC+5:30 (IST)
- PIN: 731204 (Bolpur); 731235 (Santiniketan); 731236 (Sriniketan)
- Telephone/STD code: 03463 (Bolpur Telephone Exchange)
- ISO 3166 code: IN-WB
- Vehicle registration: Bolpur RTO: WB-47 (commercial vehicles); WB-48 (private vehicles)
- Railway Station(s): Bolpur Shantiniketan railway station (BHP); Prantik railway station (PNE)
- Lok Sabha constituency: Bolpur
  - MP: Asit Kumar Mal
- Vidhan Sabha constituency: Bolpur, Nanoor
  - MLA: Chandranath Singha
- Website: bolpur-santiniketan.com bolpurmunicipality.org santiniketan.com

Bolpur is a city and a municipality in Birbhum district in the state of West Bengal, India. It is the headquarters of the Bolpur subdivision. Bolpur municipal area includes Santiniketan. The city is known as a cultural and educational hub of West Bengal. The city is under the jurisdiction of Bolpur and Santiniketan Police station. Bolpur is the largest and most populous city in Birbhum district and 28th most populous city in West Bengal. Located on the banks of Ajay River and Kopai River, Bolpur has been one of the major human settlements. It is 150 km north of Kolkata and is famous for Visva Bharati, the University set up by the Nobel laureate poet Rabindranath Tagore.

== Etymology ==
There is a mythical story that says that Supur was the capital of Raja Surath. He lost his kingdom when he had gone out for conquests, but regained the same with the blessings of goddess Bhavani. In his worship of gratitude, Raja Surath organised the sacrificial slaughtering of one lakh goats. As a result, the name of place where the sacrificial offerings were made became ‘Bolipur’ – with time it became Bolpur.

== History ==
About 150 years ago, Bolpur was a small village under Supur Porgana. Kalikapur a known place of Bolpur was the origin of the typical village in past. There were no rail lines, no developed roads. Paddy land were seen around the village. "Lalmati" (red soil) was found everywhere. Many villages named Sian, Dihipara, Khoskadampur, Paruldanga, Goalpara, Ballavpur, Bandhgara, Surul, Supur, and Raipur were the boundary line around Bolpur.

East India company established the first railway line in 1859, when the Sahebganj loopline was extended beyond the river Ajay. Bolpur railway station was established in 1860. Along with this, there is a court, a police station, sub registry office, etc., were established in old Bolpur. Then people started residing here. Christian missionaries came; they founded a church that was known as Mission compound. Paddy storage house, stationary shops, grocery shops, garment shops etc. were on the east side near Bolpur railway station. About 19 husking machines were here at that time.

Maharshi Debendranath Tagore established a centre of religious mediation in Bolpur. Rabindranath Tagore established Visva Bharati Viswavidyalaya in 1921. These were the main reasons for the huge extension, development and popularity of Bolpur.

Provincial names proved the upcoming gradual development of Bolpur. Kachharipatti is just beside court house, Trishulapatti is the commercial paddy trading centre. Kalibaroarytala was the service place for Bolpur set up by some initiative people. Netaji made a conference. Here Harisava stood against "Bramhopasana". Every week these two conferences were held in Bolpur. Bijaykrishna Ghoswami, Shivnath Shastri, Shasibhusan Basu and others gave religious advice. Beside this, prayer committee was set up.

== Geography ==
Bolpur Santiniketan
M: municipal city/ town, CT: census town, R: rural/ urban centre, U: University.
Owing to space constraints in the small map, the actual locations in a larger map may vary slightly

=== Location ===
Bolpur is located at 23.67°N 87.72°E.

Bolpur covered an area of 35.94 km^{2} (13.88 sq mi).

Note: The map alongside presents some of the notable locations in the area. All places marked in the map are linked in the larger full screen map.

In the map of Bolpur-Sriniketan CD block on page 718 of District Census Handbook Birbhum (Part A), while the area covered by Shantiniketan is shown as a part of Bolpur, Sriniketan is shown as a part of Surul, a census town.

=== Police station ===
Bolpur police station has jurisdiction over Bolpur Sriniketan community development block.

== Climate ==
The climate of Shantiniketan is moderately warm, with summer temperatures at around 35-42 °C (maximum) and winter at 7-15 °C (minimum). Summer is felt for three months, March, April and May. December, January and February are the winter months. June, July, August and September see heavy rainfall, these four months are known as monsoon (rainy season) with dry humid. Shantiniketan saw its highest temperature rising 47.0 °C, on 10 June 1966. The lowest temperature ever recorded is 4.9 °C, on 9 January 2013 (see the weather box below). The annual average temperature is 26.2 °C. About 1480mm of rain falls per year, with 76 days seeing the rain. The area is classified as an "Aw" (tropical savanna climate) under the Köppen Climate Classification.

Climate data for Santiniketan (Sriniketan) (1991–2020 normals, extremes 1961–2020)
Month	Jan	Feb	Mar	Apr	May	Jun	Jul	Aug	Sep	Oct	Nov	Dec	Year
Record high °C (°F)	33.0 (91.4)	37.0 (98.6)	42.0 (107.6)	45.9 (114.6)	46.6 (115.9)	47.0 (116.6)	41.6 (106.9)	36.8 (98.2)	39.1 (102.4)	37.1 (98.8)	34.2 (93.6)	31.8 (89.2)	47.0 (116.6)
Mean daily maximum °C (°F)	24.7 (76.5)	28.5 (83.3)	33.6 (92.5)	36.5 (97.7)	36.7 (98.1)	35.4 (95.7)	33.1 (91.6)	32.8 (91.0)	32.8 (91.0)	31.9 (89.4)	29.7 (85.5)	26.1 (79.0)	31.8 (89.2)
Mean daily minimum °C (°F)	11.1 (52.0)	14.6 (58.3)	19.4 (66.9)	23.5 (74.3)	25.1 (77.2)	26.1 (79.0)	26.1 (79.0)	26.1 (79.0)	25.5 (77.9)	22.5 (72.5)	17.3 (63.1)	12.7 (54.9)	20.8 (69.4)
Record low °C (°F)	4.9 (40.8)	6.0 (42.8)	11.2 (52.2)	14.6 (58.3)	18.1 (64.6)	18.7 (65.7)	20.0 (68.0)	22.4 (72.3)	17.7 (63.9)	15.6 (60.1)	9.7 (49.5)	6.1 (43.0)	4.9 (40.8)
Average rainfall mm (inches)	12.6 (0.50)	20.2 (0.80)	28.4 (1.12)	53.9 (2.12)	113.1 (4.45)	216.2 (8.51)	341.9 (13.46)	290.7 (11.44)	258.4 (10.17)	102.9 (4.05)	5.9 (0.23)	8.6 (0.34)	1,452.7 (57.19)
Average rainy days	1.2	1.7	1.9	3.6	6.3	11.2	15.6	14.5	11.3	4.8	0.7	0.4	73.3
Average relative humidity (%) (at 17:30 IST)	60	52	45	50	59	73	82	82	83	80	70	65	67
Source: India Meteorological Department

== Demography ==
Historical population
Year	Pop.	±%
1941	13,856	—
1951	14,802	+6.8%
1961	23,355	+57.8%
1971	29,696	+27.2%
1981	38,436	+29.4%
1991	52,760	+37.3%
2001	65,693	+24.5%
2011	80,210	+22.1%
Source: District Census Handbook Birbhum, Census of India 2011, Series 20, Part XII A

As per the 2011 Census of India, Bolpur had a total population of 80,210, of which 40,468 (50%) were males and 39,742 (50%) were females. Population in the age range of 0–6 years was 6,852. The total number of literates in Bolpur was 63,656 (86.77% of the population 7 years and over).

=== Religion ===
According to Census of India 2011, Hinduism is the predominant religion in Bolpur, followed by 89.77% of the population. It is followed by Islam with 9.68% adherents. Other religions like Christianity, Jainism, Sikhism and Buddhism are followed by less than 1% of the population.

Religions in Bolpur
Religion	Percent
Hindu	89.77%
Muslim	9.68%
Others	0.55%

== Civic administration ==
Bolpur municipality is divided into 22 wards. Until 2010, the Indian National Congress was in power in it. In the 2010 municipal elections, the municipality faced a hung verdict. Later, the Trinamool Congress with nine councillors, formed the board by taking the support of eight Congress councillors. This board officially ended its term on 2020, but due to COVID-19 pandemic, municipal election is on hold for this municipality. An Interim Administrative board is on charge of Bolpur municipality, Parna Ghosh is the current Chairperson of the municipal board. Former Loksabha Speaker Late Somnath Chatterjee had been an elected parliamentarian from 1985 till 2009 from Bolpur constituency. He was preceded by Late Saradish Roy another veteran parliamentarian from Communist Party of India (Marxist).

== Transport ==
=== Railways ===
Bolpur Shantiniketan railway station (BHP) is the major railway station under Howrah Division of Eastern Railway (ER). The station is well connected to the major cities, specially state capital Kolkata. Apart from West Bengal, the station connected to cities of other states like Guwahati, Dibrugarh, Agartala, Bhubaneswar, Visakhapatnam, Bangalore, Hyderabad and Mumbai.

Another railway station in the city is Prantik railway station (PNE) which is the next station of Bolpur Shantiniketan. Some local passenger and express trains give a stop in this station.

=== Roadways ===
Bolpur is connected to all important cities by roadways. National Highway 114 (old numbering NH 2B) pass through Bolpur. The highway runs from NH 14 (old numbering NH 60) at Mallarpur to NH 19 (old numbering NH 2) at Burdwan. This highway connects Bolpur with Burdwan (60 km) and Kolkata (160 km). SH 14 or Morgram - Panagarh highway passes through 15 km away from Bolpur at Illambazar, and junction with NH 19 at Panagarh (40 km). This route connects Bolpur with Durgapur (54 km), Asansol (97 km), Maithon (120 km) and Dhanbad (160 km). Bolpur-Suri road connects Bolpur with district headquarter Suri (35 km) and the road cross NH 14 at Suri. After crossing, the road goes towards Massanjore (70 km), Dumka (98 km), Deoghar (165 km). Distance from Bolpur to Berhampore via Nanoor is 100 km, and Katwa via Nutanhat is 54 km.

Bolpur is connected through WBTC, SBSTC and private bus services. Private cab services are also available.

=== Airways ===
Bolpur has no airport of its own. The nearest airport from Bolpur is Kazi Nazrul Islam Airport located 70 km away in Andal, Durgapur. The nearest international airport is Netaji Subhash Chandra Bose International Airport (CCU) located 160 km away in Dum Dum (Kolkata).

== Education ==
=== Universities and Colleges ===
==== Universities ====
- Visva-Bharati University
- Seacom Skills University
- Biswa Bangla Biswabidyalay (Bolpur University)

==== General Colleges ====
- Bolpur College
- Purni Devi Chaudhuri Girls' College (PDCGC)

==== Medical Colleges ====
- Santiniketan Medical College

==== Engineering / Management / Polytechnic ====
- Bengal Institute of Technology & Management (B.I.T.M Santiniketan)
- Santiniketan Institute of Polytechnic (S.I.P Bolpur)

==== Law Colleges ====
- Bengal Law College

==== Nursing Colleges ====
- Santiniketan Sebaniketan Nursing Institute

=== Schools ===
==== Visva Bharati affiliated Schools ====
- Patha Bhavana
- Siksha Satra

==== Residential Schools ====
- Ekalavya Model Residential School (EMRS)

==== Private Schools ====
- Techno India Group Public School (TIGPS)
- Ryan International School
- Nava Nalanda High School
- St.Teresa's School, ICSE ISC Board
- North Point Senior Secondary Boarding School

==== Central Government Schools ====
- Kendriya Vidyalaya

==== State Government High Schools ====
- Bolpur High School
- Bolpur Girls' High School
- Bandhgora Kalikrishna Vidyapith
- Srinanda High School
- Bolpur NNB High School
- Bolpur Vivekananda Vidyapith
- Shailabala Girls' High School

== Healthcare ==
Bolpur Subdivisional Hospital has 520 beds. Bolpur Block Primary Health Centre at Bolpur, serving Bolpur Sriniketan community development block, has 60 beds.

Pathyasathi Ayurveda Sonajhuri, Santiniketan has 30 beds, an ayurvedic hospital in collaboration with Dhanwanthari Vaidyasala. The later is recognized as one of the oldest houses of Ayurveda in Kerala.

== Wildlife sanctuary ==
• Ballabhpur Wildlife Sanctuary & Deer Park (Santiniketan)

== See also ==
- Rampurhat
- Malda, West Bengal
- Basirhat
- Barrackpore
- Durgapur
