= Supur, Birbhum =

Supur
- Village
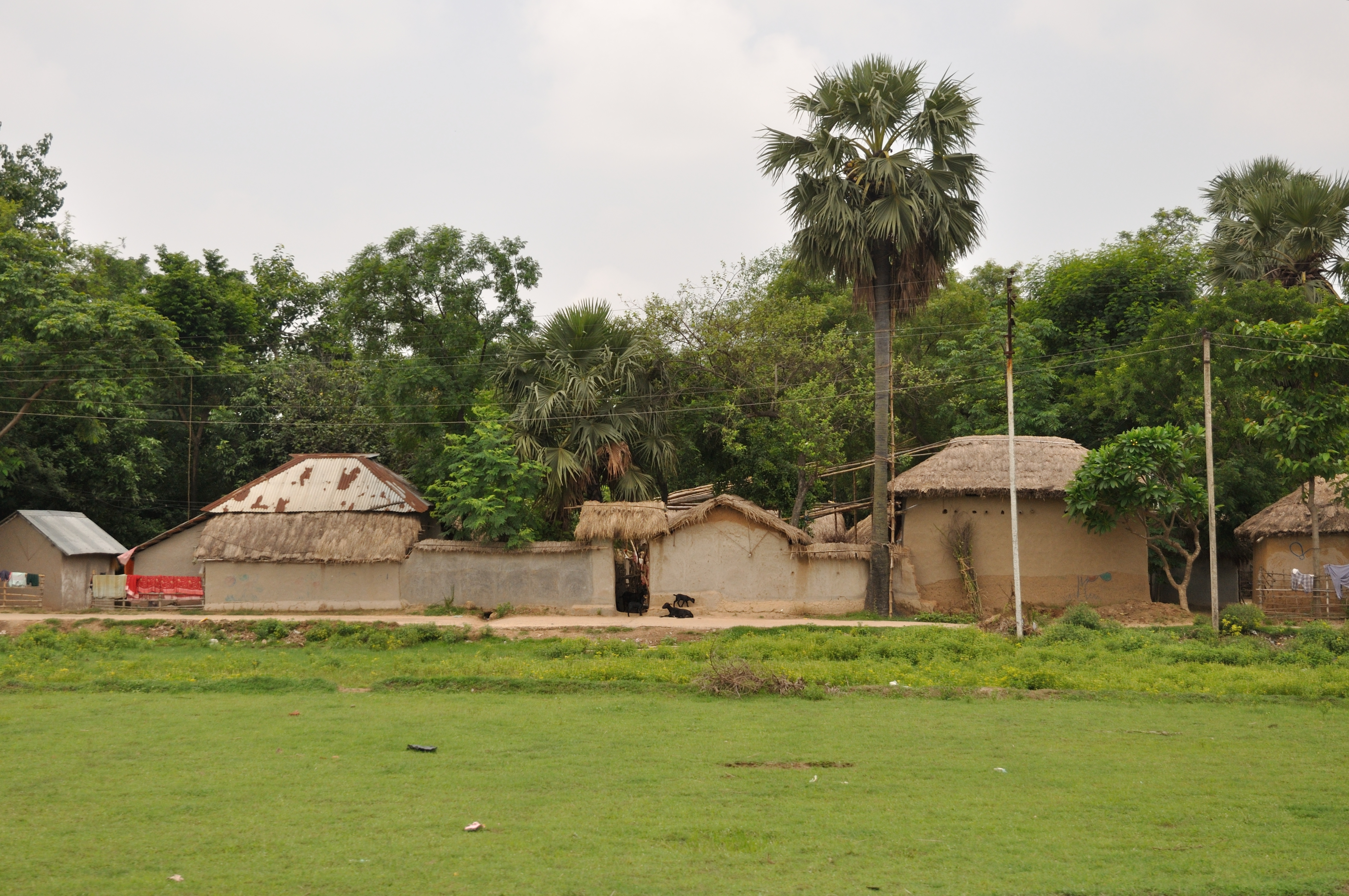
- Supur village

- Location in West Bengal Supur (India)
- Coordinates: 23.627022°N 87.681472°E
- Country: India
- State: West Bengal
- District: Birbhum

Population (2011)
  - Total: 1,803

Languages
  - Official: Bengali, English
- Time zone: IST
- PIN: 731204
- Telephone/ STD code: 03463
- Lok Sabha constituency: Bolpur
- Vidhan Sabha constituency: Bolpur
- Website: birbhum.nic.in

Supur is a village under Raipur-Supur gram panchayat in Bolpur Sriniketan CD block in Bolpur subdivision of Birbhum district, West Bengal, India.

== History ==
As per mythology, in ancient times, Supur was the capital of Raja Surath. Some 150 years ago or a little earlier, Supur and Surul were better known places than Bolpur, then a small village, and Shantiniketan did not exist.

== Geography ==
=== Location ===
Supur is located at 23.627022°N 87.681472°E.

== Demographics ==
As per the 2011 Census of India, Supur had a total population of 1,803 of which 910 (50%) were males and 893 (50%) were females. Population below 6 years was 220. The total number of literates in Supur was 1,096 (69.24% of the population over 6 years).

== Transport ==
Supur is on National Highway 114.

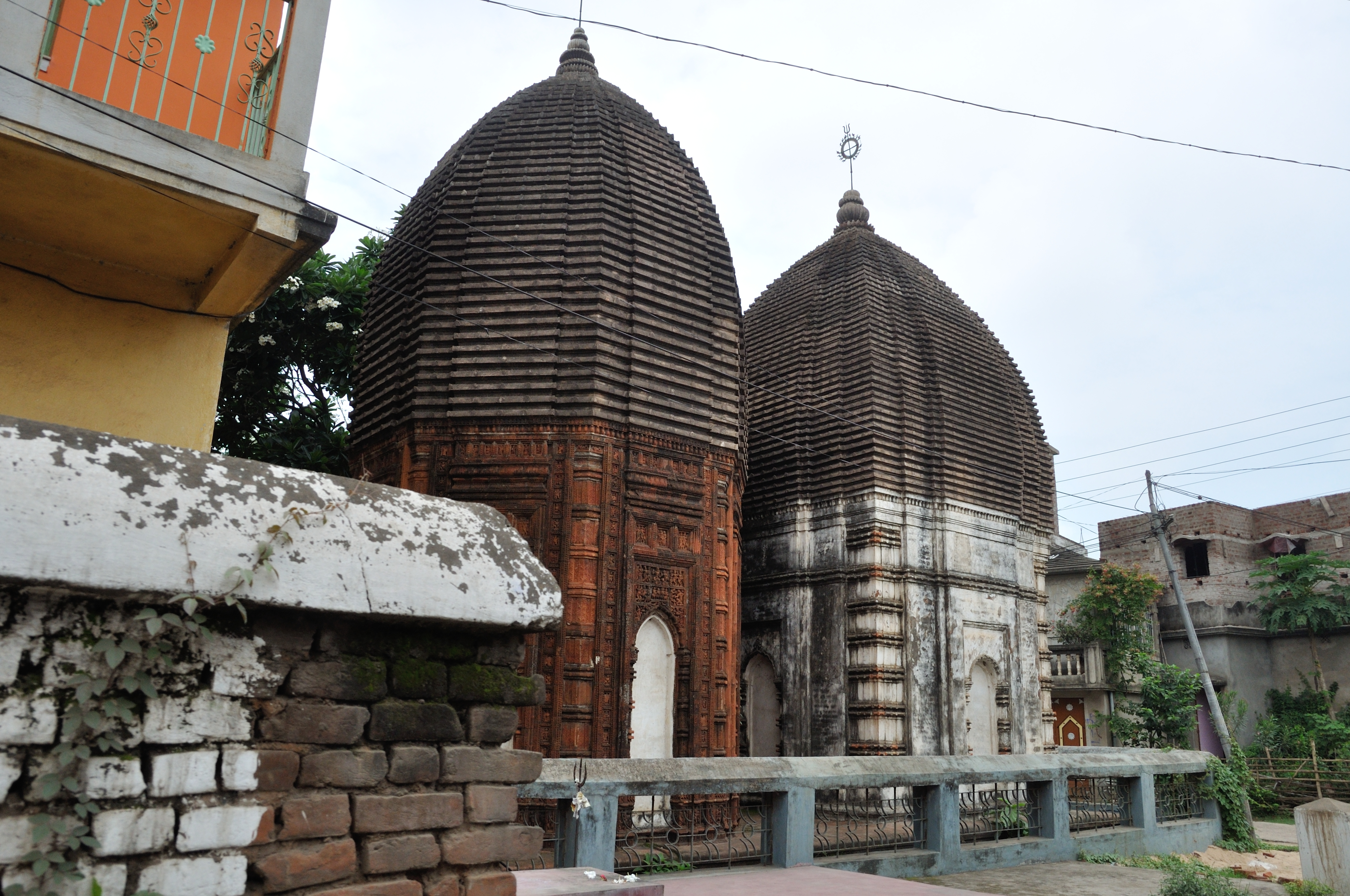
Twin Shiva temples

== Culture ==
As seen in the photograph (alongside) there are two Shiva temples at Supur, referred to as twin Shiva temples. David J. McCutchion mentions that one of them is a 19th century ridged rekha deul, with rich terracotta decoration on all sides. The other one is a rekha deul with ridged turrets.

== Healthcare ==
There is a primary health centre at Supur (with 10 beds).
