= Garh Jungle =

Garh Jungle Ashram of Medhas Muni Shri Shri Garh Chandi Dham

- Location within West Bengal Location within India
- Coordinates: 23.6061°N 87.4296°E
- Country: India
- State: West Bengal

Languages
  - Official: Bengali, English
- Website: paschimbardhaman.gov.in

Garh Jungle is an important place in Hindu mythology, especially Shakta. It is located in the Kanksa CD block of the Durgapur subdivision in Paschim Bardhaman district of West Bengal. Ashram of Medhas Muni was established here.

== Geography ==
Cities and towns in the southern and eastern portions of Durgapur subdivision in Paschim Bardhaman district
MC: Municipal Corporation, CT: census town, R: rural centre, A: airport, B: barrage, H: historical site
Owing to space constraints in the small map, the actual locations in a larger map may vary slightly

== Historical significance ==
According to Sri Sri Chandi, King Surath meet to boisya samadhi at Ashram of Medhas. This Ashram was established in Garh Jungle. King Surath and Boisya Samadhi learned Devi Mahatmya from Medhas in this place. Surath organized a durgapuja here in spring time. According to Shri Shri Chandi and Markandeya Purana this durgapuja, which was organized in Garh Jungle, was first Durgapuja of Bengal.

== Temples ==
Surath established Tridebi's temple in this jungle area, i.e. Temple of Mahakali, Mahasaraswati and Mahalakshmi. Now, along with them Ashram of Medhas Muni, a Temple of Mahakal Bhairab is also there. There were 16 temples and only two are present: Shyamarupa Mandir and Shib Mandir.

== Gallery ==
Road to Garh Jungle

Temple of Medhas Muni

Shyamarupa Mandir in Garh Jungle

Ruined fort wall of Garh Jungle
