= Louisiana Highway 1208 =

State highway in Louisiana, United States

Louisiana Highway 1208

- Map of all five sections of LA 1208 (each section in red)

Route information
- Maintained by Louisiana DOTD

Location
- Country: United States
- State: Louisiana
- Parishes: Rapides

Highway system
- Louisiana State Highway System; Interstate; US; State; Scenic
← LA 1207	→ LA 1209

Louisiana Highway 1208 (LA 1208) is a collection of five state highways which serve Alexandria in Rapides Parish.

== Louisiana Highway 1208-1 ==
Louisiana Highway 1208-1
- Location: Alexandria
- Length: 1.82 mi (2.93 km)

Louisiana Highway 1208-1 (LA 1208-1) spans 1.82 miles (2.93 km) from west to east and is known as Willow Glen River Road. LA 1208-1 begins at an intersection with I-49, starting at it as a frontage road. LA 1208-1 turns east towards LA 1 (Third Street). LA 1 heads north into downtown Alexandria, and south towards Marksville and Baton Rouge. LA 1208-1 used to extend along I-49 to US 71, but the latest DOTD maps show the highway shortened to only Willow Glen River Road.

=== Junction list ===
The entire highway is in Alexandria, Rapides Parish.

mi	km	Destinations	Notes
0.00	0.00	I-49	Western terminus, no exit
1.82	2.93	LA 1 (Third Street)	LA 1 North to Alexandria, US 167; LA 1 South to Baton Rouge
1.000 mi = 1.609 km; 1.000 km = 0.621 mi

== Louisiana Highway 1208-2 ==
Louisiana Highway 1208-2
- Location: Alexandria
- Length: 0.42 mi (680 m)

Louisiana Highway 1208-2 (LA 1208-2) spans 0.42 miles (0.68 km) in a west to east direction. It is known as Sterkx Rd. LA 1208-2 begins at an intersection with LA 488 near the community of Anandale. It continues eastward towards MacArthur Drive, ending at an intersection with US 71 (MacArthur Drive/Jefferson Hwy). The road passes next to the DOTD District 08 headquarters along its entire route.

=== Junction list ===
The entire highway is in Alexandria, Rapides Parish.

mi	km	Destinations	Notes
0.00	0.00	LA 488 (Horseshoe Drive)	
0.42	0.68	US 71 (MacArthur Drive)	LA 1208-2 continues across U.S. 71 to meet U.S. 167 Business
1.000 mi = 1.609 km; 1.000 km = 0.621 mi

== Louisiana Highway 1208-3 ==
Louisiana Highway 1208-3
- Location: Alexandria
- Length: 3.60 mi (5.79 km)

Louisiana Highway 1208-3 (LA 1208-3) spans 3.60 miles (5.79 km) from west to east and is known as Jackson Street. From the west, LA 1208-3 begins at an intersection with LA 488, known as Twin Bridges Road. It heads in a northeastern direction, passing Alexandria Senior High School and enters a heavily traveled section, lined with fast food restaurants and grocery stores. LA 1208-3 then passes under US 71/165 at a modernized interchange. It sheds two lanes to become a two-lane road through Alexandria's garden district, ending at an interchange with LA 1/28 BUS, with Jackson Street picking up the US 165 BUS designation.

=== Junction list ===
The entire highway is in Alexandria, Rapides Parish.

mi	km	Destinations	Notes
0.00	0.00	LA 488	
1.92	3.09	US 71 / US 165 (MacArthur Drive)	
3.60	5.79	US 165 Bus. / LA 1 / LA 28 Bus. (Bolton Avenue)	
1.000 mi = 1.609 km; 1.000 km = 0.621 mi

== Louisiana Highway 1208-4 ==
Louisiana Highway 1208-4
- Location: Alexandria
- Length: 2.02 mi (3.25 km)

Louisiana Highway 1208-4 (LA 1208-4) spans 2.02 miles (3.25 km) from south to north and is known as Eddie Williams Avenue. From the south, LA 1208-4 takes over for the former designation of LA 1208-1 along US 71. It then follows the route of I-49, truncating at the Sugarhouse Road exit for I-49. It was created in 2012.

=== Junction list ===
The entire highway is in Alexandria, Rapides Parish.

mi	km	Destinations	Notes
0.00	0.00	US 71 / US 167	Southern terminus
1.92	3.09	I-49 – Shreveport	Northern terminus, southbound onramp
1.000 mi = 1.609 km; 1.000 km = 0.621 mi

== Louisiana Highway 1208-5 ==
Louisiana Highway 1208-5
- Location: Alexandria
- Length: 1.52 mi (2.45 km)

Louisiana Highway 1208-5 (LA 1208-5) spans 1.52 miles (2.45 km) from west to east and is known as Masonic Drive. LA 1208-5 begins at an intersection with US 71 and US 165 at the South Traffic Circle, and extends north along Masonic Drive. It passes next to Bringhurst Field and Silver Dollar Pawn, home of Cajun Pawn Stars, a reality show on the History Channel. LA 1208-5 ends at an intersection with US 167 Business. LA 1208-5 was originally a segment of Business US 165, which has been truncated to Pineville.

=== Junction list ===
The entire highway is in Alexandria, Rapides Parish.

mi	km	Destinations	Notes
0.00	0.00	US 71 / US 165	Western terminus
1.52	2.45	US 167 Bus. (Mason/Overton Streets)	Eastern terminus
1.000 mi = 1.609 km; 1.000 km = 0.621 mi

== Deleted and changed routes ==
=== Louisiana Highway 1208-4 (Upper Third Street) ===
Louisiana Highway 1208-4
- Location: Alexandria
- Length: 1.60 mi (2.57 km)
- Existed: 1955–2012

Louisiana Highway 1208-4 (LA 1208-4) spanned 1.60 miles (2.57 km) from west to east and is known as Upper Third Street. LA 1208-4 began at an intersection with US 71 and US 165 (Monroe Highway) just north of 71/165's intersection with I-49 and LA 28. It continued eastward towards Rapides Regional Medical Center, ending at an intersection with US 165 Business (Jackson Street).

=== Junction list ===
The entire highway was in Alexandria, Rapides Parish.

mi	km	Destinations	Notes
0.00	0.00	US 71 (Monroe Highway) / US 165	
0.00	0.00	I-49 / LA 28	
1.60	2.57	US 165 Bus. (Jackson Street)	
1.000 mi = 1.609 km; 1.000 km = 0.621 mi
