= Ballabhpur Wildlife Sanctuary =

Wildlife sanctuary in Bolpur, West Bengal, India

- Deer Park
- IUCN category IV (habitat/species management area)
- Location within West Bengal Location within India
- Interactive map of Ballabhpur Wildlife Sanctuary
- Location: Ballavpur, Santiniketan, Bolpur, Birbhum district, West Bengal, India
- Nearest city: Bolpur Santiniketan
- Coordinates: 23.685011°N 87.653021°E
- Area: 2 square kilometres (0.77 sq mi)
- Established: 1977

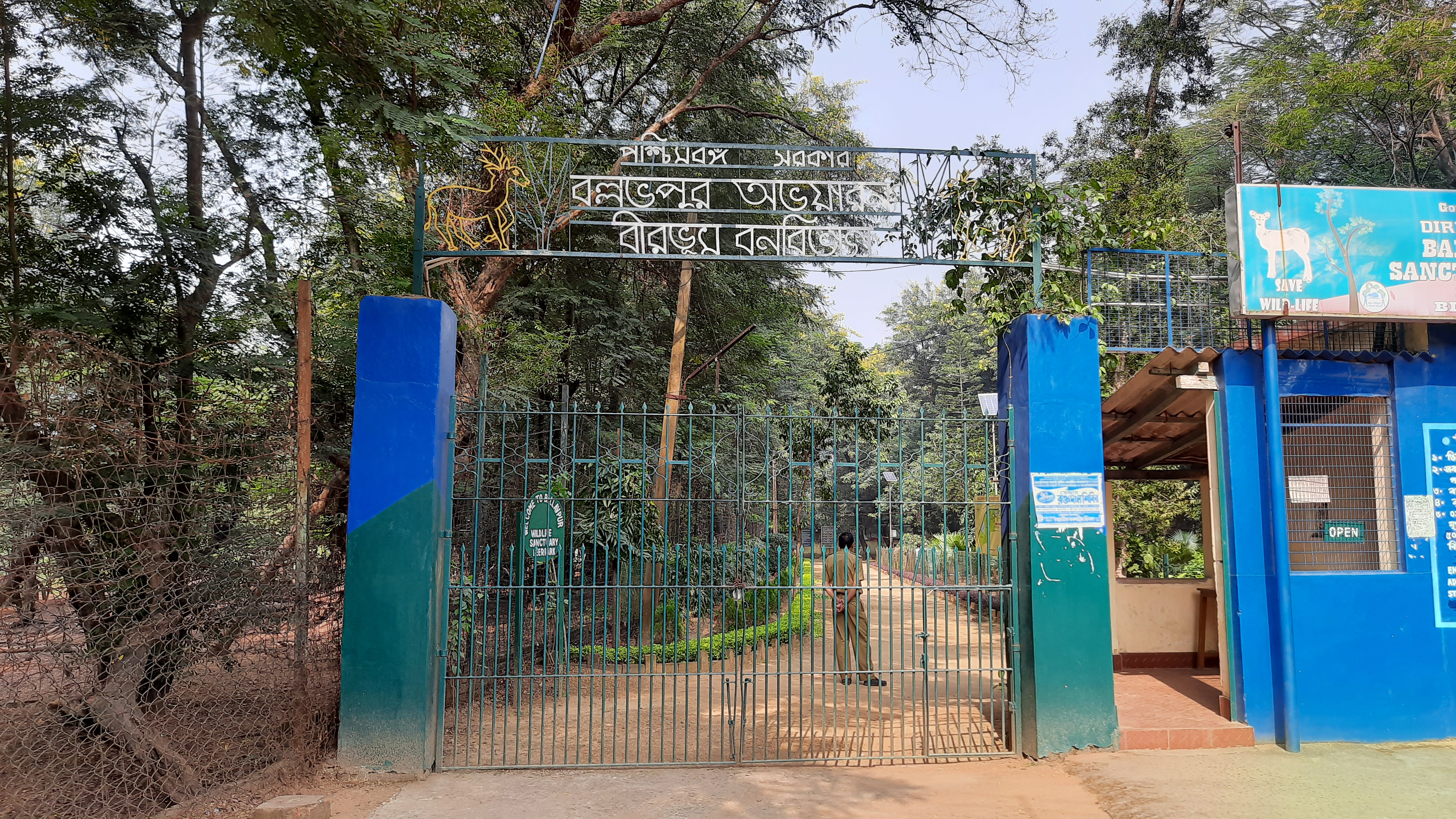
Ballabhpur wildlife sanctuary gates.

Ballabhpur Wildlife Sanctuary (popular as Deer Park) was established in 1977. This wooded area is located near Bolpur Santiniketan in Bolpur subdivision of Birbhum District in the Indian state of West Bengal.

== Geography and location ==
This wildlife sanctuary is located in Bolpur Santiniketan. It has an average elevation of 56 metres (184 ft). With an area of 200 hectares, Ballavpur Wildlife Sanctuary located on the fringes of the University town of Bolpur. Just a kilometer from the Viswa Bharati University area, this lush Wildlife Sanctuary is home to three large water bodies (Jheel) which hosts migratory as well as resident birds in plenty.

=== Climate ===
During the summer, the temperature can reach well above 40 °C (104 °F) and in winters it can drop to around 10 °C (50 °F). The annual average rainfall is 1,212 millimetres (47.7 in), mostly in the monsoon months (June to October).

== Fauna ==
This Wildlife Sanctuary is home to three large water bodies (Jheel) which hosts migratory as well as resident birds in plenty. The sanctuary was established in September 1967 and has one of the most successful deer conservation records in the state. It is home to numerous Cheethals (Spotted Deer), Blackbuck and other resident animals like jackals and foxes. The whole sanctuary is a protected area with watchtowers and jungle paths for tourists to walk around and catch glimpses of deer and other wildlife.

== Timings ==
It is open from 10 am to 4 pm. It is closed on Wednesday.
