= Markandeya Purana =

Ancient Sanskrit text

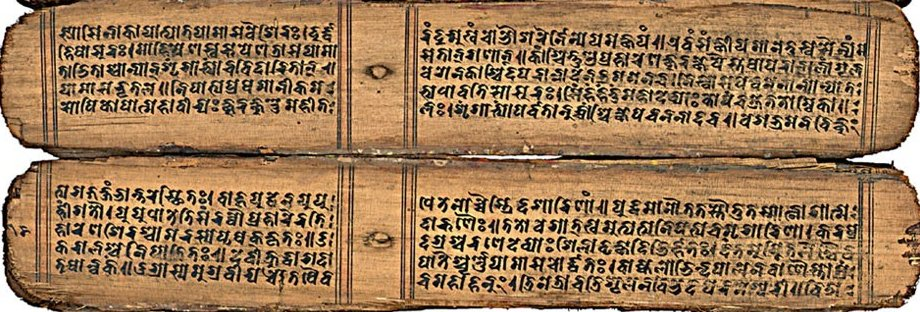
The oldest surviving manuscript of the Devi Māhātmya (part of Markandeya Purana), on palm-leaf, in an early Bhujimol script, Nepal, 11th century.

The Markandeya Purana (Sanskrit: मार्कण्डेय पुराण; IAST: Mārkaṇḍeya Purāṇa) is a Sanskrit text of Hinduism, and one of the eighteen major Puranas. The text's title Markandeya refers to a sage in Hindu literature who is the central character in two legends, one linked to Shiva and other to Vishnu. The Markandeya text is one of the Puranas that lacks a sectarian presentation of ideas in favor of any particular god, and it is rare to read any deity being invoked or deity prayers in the entire text.

The Markandeya Purana is probably one of the oldest in Purana genre of Hindu Literature, among the most interesting and important, states Ludo Rocher. It is famous for including the Devi Mahatmya within it, the oldest known treatise on Devi (Goddess) as the Supreme Truth and Creator of the Universe. The text is considered as a central text of the Hindu Goddess-related Shaktism tradition, with an extraordinary expression of reverence for the feminine. The Markandeya Purana's Devi Mahatmya is often ranked in some Hindu traditions to be as important as the Bhagavad Gita.

The extant manuscripts of this Purana have 137 chapters, of which chapters 81 through 93 is the Devi Mahatmya. Tradition and some medieval era texts assert that the Markandeya Purana has 9,000 verses, but surviving Manuscripts have about 6,900 verses. 2,100 verses were transferred to Devi Bhagavatam. The text presents a diverse range of topics, with socio-cultural information and symbolism for Vedic ideas and Metaphysical Thought.

== History ==
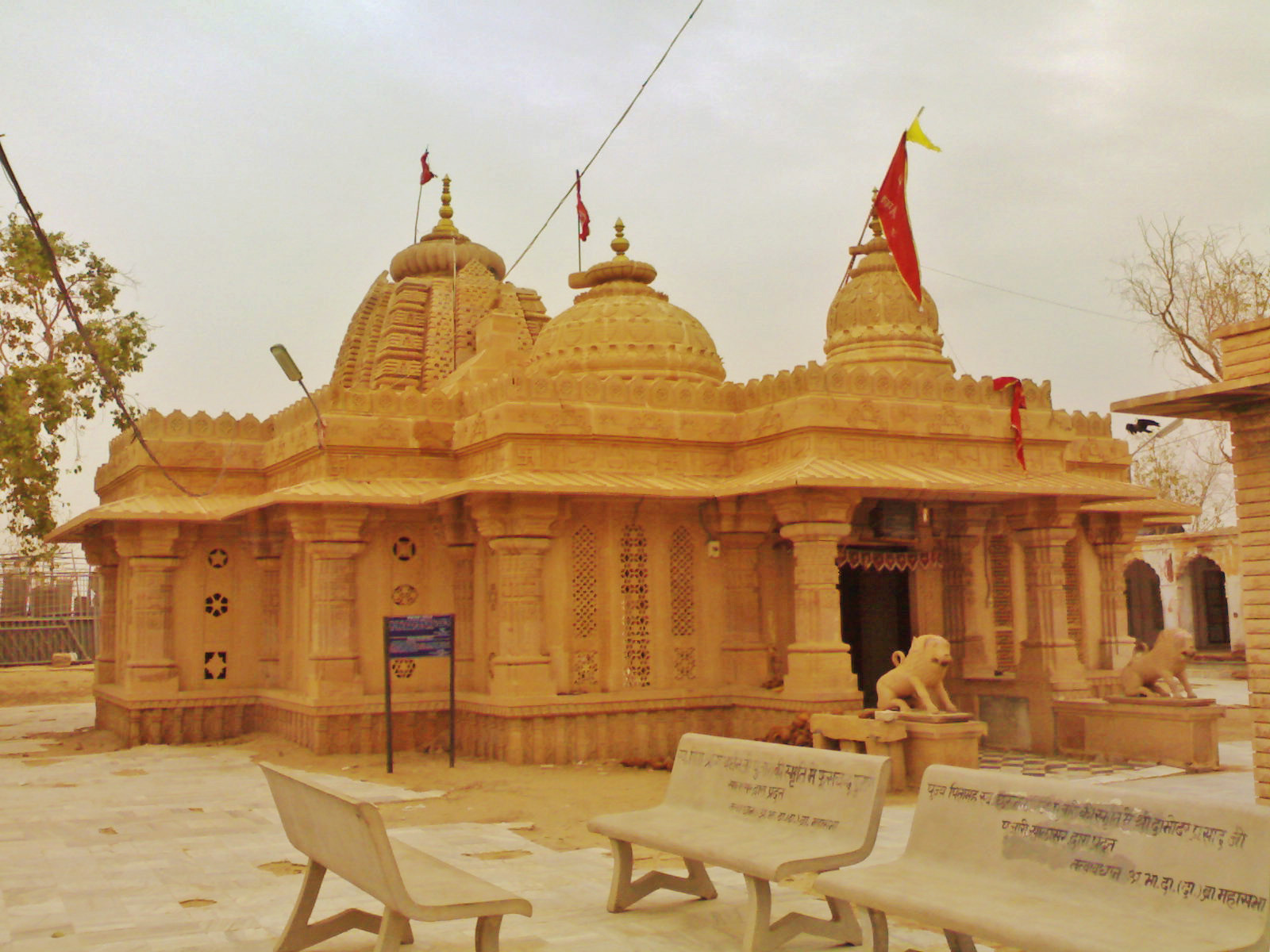
The Early 1st-Millennium Dadhimati Mata Temple Of Rajasthan, Near Jodhpur And Bikaner, That Preserves An Inscription From Markandeya Purana. The Temple Inscription Has Been Dated To The Early Seventh Century CE.

The Markandeya text is probably one of the oldest Puranas in Hinduism. The text's literary style and content, wherein the early chapters read like a supplement to the Hindu epic Mahabharata has led scholars to suggest it is an early composition that likely followed the epic.

The Markandeya Purana, states Wendy Doniger, is probably from c. 250 CE, with the exception of the Devi Mahatmya, which she dates to c. 550 CE. Other scholars have also suggested that parts of this Purana existed by the third century. In contrast, Nileshvari Desai suggests that the oldest of extant manuscripts probably is from the 7th-century CE. The earliest version of the Makandeya Purana, with Devi Mahatmya, was probably composed near the Narmada river, in Western India.

The text has also been dated with the help of epigraphical evidence. The Dadhimati Mata inscription, for example has been dated to be from 608 CE, and this inscription is a quote from chapter 10 of the Devi Mahatmya (91st chapter of the Purana). This suggests that this part of the text existed by the 6th century CE. A complete Palm-leaf manuscript of the text was discovered in Nepal, and has been dated to 998 CE. Similarly, the early 8th-century text Malatimadhava of Bhavabhuti references Devi Mahatmya, which implies the text was established and in circulation by then. Other scholars have placed it between 4th- to 6th-century CE. The idea of Goddess as the supreme, states John Lochtefeld, likely existed before the 6th-century than the composition date of Devi Mahatmya, because it appears in so fully developed form in the text.

Like all the Puranas, the Markandeya Purana, has a complicated chronology. Dimmitt and van Buitenen state that each of the Puranas is encyclopedic in style, and it is difficult to ascertain when, where, why and by whom these were written:

As they exist today, the Puranas are a stratified literature. Each titled work consists of material that has grown by numerous accretions in successive historical eras. Thus no Purana has a single date of composition. (...) It is as if they were libraries to which new volumes have been continuously added, not necessarily at the end of the shelf, but randomly.

— Cornelia Dimmitt and J.A.B. van Buitenen, Classical Hindu Mythology: A Reader in the Sanskrit Puranas

=== Printed editions ===
The three early printed editions of this text vary from one another. The Calcutta edition ends abruptly in chapter 136, leaving the narrative of Dama halfway. The Bombay and Poona editions have complete narrative of Dama, which ends in chapter 137.

The text has been translated into English by many, including C. C. Mukherjee (1893) and F. E. Pargiter. However, states Coburn, Pargiter's focus was reconstruction of India's political history, not other contents of the Purana. Pargiter's work and conclusions have been widely disputed, after he published his translation in 1904.

A good translation of the Devi Mahatmya text within the Markandeya Purana, states Gregory Bailey, was published in 1991 by Thomas Coburn.

==== Critical edition ====
The Critical Edition of the Mārkaṇḍeyapurāṇam, edited by M. L. Wadekar, 2 vols., Vadodara: Oriental Institute, 2011 (vol. 2, adhyāyas 76-88, is the Devīmāhātmyam).

== Content ==
This Purana has 137 chapters, of which chapters 81 through 93 is the Devi Mahatmya. The text opens with the Mimamsa founder Jaimini asking sage Markandeya for answers to some questions raised by the Mahabharata, but never addressed in it. Markandeya asserts that he needs to go and perform some Vedic rituals, and suggests Jaimini to meet up with four wise birds who live in the Vindhya range. Jaimini meets the birds. The birds answer his questions, which constitute chapters 4 to 45 of the Markandeya Purana. This discussion weaves in moral instructions with mythology, the theory of Karma, Samsara, Dharma and Shraddha verses from texts such as the Mahabharata and the Gautama Dharmasutras.

The text presents its Yoga philosophy in chapters 39 to 43, and asserts that it is the path to gain self-knowledge and liberation (Moksha), thereby overcoming past Karma. The Yoga discussions, Dattatreya's portrayal and his yoga-teachings within the Markandeya Purana, states Rigopoulos, are essentially those of Jnana yoga, and this emphasis on Jnana within a nondual (Advaita Vedanta) framework characterizes Dattatreya throughout the text. More generally, the Markandeya Purana, along with Vishnu, Vayu, Narada and Kurma Puranas, states Sahasrabudhe, have "unmistakingly the Advaita" (non-dualistic) premises, which likely reflect the Advaita tradition before the times of Adi Shankara.

The later chapters also present a conversation between the birds and sage Markandeya, but the sage is the primary speaker in chapters 45-80 and 94-137. This switch in style, state scholars, is likely because this part is the older core of the Purana. This part consists of genealogy, manvantaras, geography and chapters glorifying god Surya (Sun god).

=== Devi Mahatmya ===
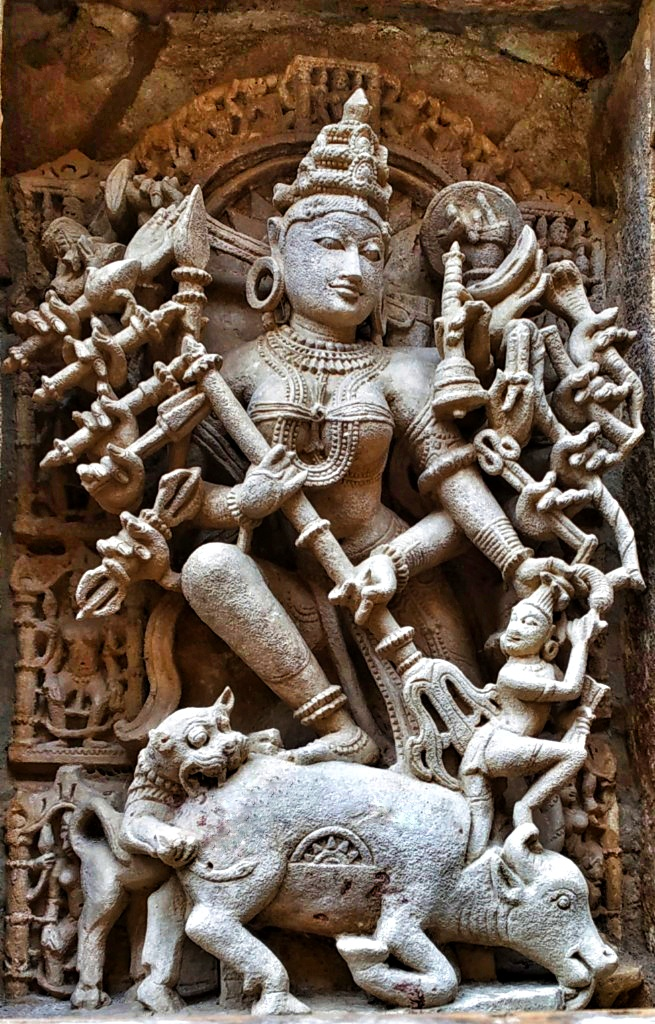
Goddess Durga killing Mahishasura, Sacred idol in Rani ki vav

The Devi Mahatmya, literally "glorification or praises of the Goddess", constitutes chapters 81 to 93 of the Markandeya Purana. It is the primary bhakti text of those who revere Durga or Chandi as the Shakti. This text is studied on its own, and sometimes titled as Saptasati or Chandi-mahatmya or Chandipatha. It is particularly popular in eastern states of India, such as West Bengal and Odisha.

The Devi Mahatmya opens with the legend of King Suratha, who was defeated in battle & exiled, and Samadhi, a merchant who was driven away by his wives & children for his wealth. Once, they meet in the forest. Nevertheless, asserts the text, the two discover that they both care about the welfare of those who drove them out. They wonder why they still care. They meet sage Medhas (Sumedha) for answers. The sage replies that this is the nature of existence, just watch the hungry birds who collect seeds, and despite being hungry those birds drop the seeds into the beaks of their babies. This is the power of the Goddess, her manifestation in nature and everywhere, one who empowers attachments, yet also empowers release, asserts the text. The two men want to know more about this Goddess. The Devi Mahatmya portion of this Purana describes the Goddess with theological and philosophical premises focussed on the feminine.

=== Socio-cultural content ===
The text presents a diverse range of topics including society, religion and mythology. Embedded in its chapters is information on Family, Marriage, Social Life, Dress, Food, Customs, Ceremonies, Weights And Measures, Social Conventions, Position Of Women, Geography, Flora And Fauna known and considered important in ancient Indian society along with Mythology and Theology.

Wendy Doniger states that the Markandeya Purana challenges some of the contextual assumptions about the medieval Indian society in 1st-millennium. She writes, in her analysis of chapters 10 and 11 of the text which discusses its theory of embryo development and wherein the Purana asserts that woman's contribution to the development and the health of a fetus is essential: (Note: The Markandeya Purana States, "For What The Woman Eats And Drinks Goes Into The Embryo's Womb, And The Living Creature's Body Is Strengthened And Nourished By That So That It Grows".)

The predominance of the father in the making of the body, that Manu insists upon, is here undercut not only by the role of the mother in contributing to the physical substance of the body, but also by the role of the embryo itself.

— Wendy Doniger, in Religion and the Body

== Translations ==
The 'Markandeya Purana' has been rendered into various Indian languages. The following is a partial list of translations:

=== English ===
- The Markandeya Purana by F. E. Pargiter (1904)
- Markandeya Purana by Bibek Debroy (2019)

== Influence ==
The Chandi Charitar Ukati Bilas in Dasam Granth – a secondary scripture of Sikhism, state Louis E. Fenech and W. H. McLeod, is sourced from the Markandeya Purana.

The Devi-Mahatmya portion of the text is recited during Durga Puja festival, in Durga temples of India.

== See also ==
- Surath
- Garh Jungle
- Brahman
- Devi-Bhagavata Purana
- Devi Upanishad
- Tripura Upanishad
- Chandi di Var (In Sikhism)

== Bibliography ==
- Asopa, Pandit Ram Karna (1911). Hultzsch, Eugen (ed.). "Dadhimati-Mata Inscription of Dhruhlana". Epigraphia Indica. 11.
- Bailey, Gregory (2003). Sharma, Arvind (ed.). The Study of Hinduism. University of South Carolina Press. ISBN 978-1-57003-449-7.
- Brown, Cheever Mackenzie (1998). The Devi Gita: The Song of the Goddess: A Translation, Annotation, and Commentary. SUNY Press. ISBN 978-0-7914-3939-5.
- Coburn, Thomas B. (1988). Devī-māhātmya: The Crystallization of the Goddess Tradition. Motilal Banarsidass. ISBN 978-81-208-0557-6.
- Collins, Charles Dillard (1988). The Iconography and Ritual of Siva at Elephanta: On Life, Illumination, and Being. SUNY Press. ISBN 978-0-88706-773-0.
- Dalal, Rosen (2014). Hinduism: An Alphabetical Guide. Penguin. ISBN 978-8184752779.
- Dimmitt, Cornelia; Van Buitenen, J.A.B. (2012). Classical Hindu Mythology: A Reader in the Sanskrit Puranas. Temple University Press. ISBN 978-1-4399-0464-0.
- Doniger, Wendy (2000). Coakley, Sarah (ed.). Religion and the Body. Cambridge University Press. ISBN 978-0-521-78386-6.
- Dutt, M.N. (1896). Markandeya Puranam. Elysium Press.
- Fenech, Louis E.; McLeod, W.H. (2014). Historical Dictionary of Sikhism. Rowman & Littlefield Publishers. ISBN 978-1-4422-3601-1.
- Flood, Gavin (1996). An Introduction to Hinduism. Cambridge University Press. p. 181. ISBN 978-0-521-43878-0.
- Gietz, K.P.; et al. (1992). Epic and Puranic Bibliography (Up to 1985) Annotated and with Indexes: Part I: A - R, Part II: S - Z, Indexes. Otto Harrassowitz Verlag. ISBN 978-3-447-03028-1.
- Hazra, Rajendra Chandra (1962). "The Puranas". In Radhakrishnan, S. (ed.). The Cultural Heritage of India. Vol. 2. Calcutta: The Ramakrishna Mission Institute of Culture. ISBN 81-85843-03-1.
- Lochtefeld, James (2002). The Illustrated Encyclopedia of Hinduism, Vol. 1 & 2. Rosen Publishing. ISBN 978-0823931798.
- Pargiter, Frederick Eden (1904). Markandeya Purana. Calcutta: The Baptist Mission Press.
- Rigopoulos, Antonio (1998). Dattatreya: The Immortal Guru, Yogin, and Avatara: A Study of the Transformative and Inclusive Character of a Multi-faceted Hindu Deity. State University of New York Press. ISBN 978-0-7914-3696-7.
- Rinehart, Robin (2011). Debating the Dasam Granth. Oxford University Press. ISBN 978-0-19-984247-6.
- Rocher, Ludo (1986). The Purāṇas. Wiesbaden: Otto Harrassowitz Verlag. ISBN 3-447-02522-0.
- Sahasrabudhe, M.T. (1968). A Survey of the Pre-Śaṅkara Advaita Vedānta. University of Pune Press.
- Shastri, Pushpendra (1995). Introduction to the Puranas. New Delhi: Rashtriya Sanskrit Sansthan.
- Varma, Vishwanath Prasad (1978). "Ethics and Sociology of Politics in some of the Puranas". The Indian Journal of Political Science. 39 (2): 270–298. ISSN 0019-5510. JSTOR 41854846.
- Wilson, Horace Hayman (1864). The Vishnu Purana: A System of Hindu Mythology and Tradition. Vol. 1. Read Country Books. ISBN 1-84664-664-2.
