= Alexander Fulton (Louisiana) =

Alexander Fulton (1763–1816) was a Scottish-born Pennsylvanian who was involved in the Whiskey Rebellion, and later relocated first to the Ohio Country and then Spanish colonial Louisiana.

== Whiskey Rebellion pardon ==
Fulton wrote George Washington requesting clemency in autumn 1794 but "Despite this plea, Fulton was among the insurgents exempted from the general pardon issued by Henry Lee...However, he eventually was included among the ten insurgents named in a pardon issued by [Washington] on 3 March 1797." This pardon was signed on Washington's last day in office.

== In Spanish colonial Louisiana ==
Between 1794 and 1797, having fled the state of Pennsylvania, Fulton reportedly relocated to the Ohio Country and then Spanish colonial Louisiana.

In 1796, Fulton "somehow convinced the Spanish government to give him exclusive rights to deal with the Native Americans" at his trading post in Rapides, and "came up with the idea to give [the Indigenous locals] unlimited credit...then, he decided to collect and when they couldn't pay, he took their land." Fulton and his partner William Miller had one of the largest private land claims in Louisiana. Between 1806 and 1814 territorial Indian agent Dr. John Sibley repeatedly supported claims by Apalachee, Biloxi, Choctaw, Pascagoula, and Taensa people that the pair had wrongfully dispossessed them of thousands of arpents of land.

Fulton served in the Louisiana territorial legislature at which time he got into a conflict with Richard D. Claiborne, first cousin of territorial governor W. C. C. Claiborne. In 1808 Fulton charged Judge Claiborne of Rapides Parish with "oppression, extortion, & altering and mutilating records"; the judge was ultimately cleared of the charges.

Fulton is credited with founding the city of Alexandria, Louisiana. He laid out the town and named it after his baby daughter; later, with the rise of the steamboat, the settlement grew as "Adjacent forests were cut down to provide lumber for fast-growing New Orleans, and vast acreages were planted in cotton, sugar cane, and other crops."

Fulton himself became a Louisiana sugar planter.

In 1807 Fulton was a stakeholder in the Mississippi Messenger newspaper of Natchez, along with Henry D. Downs of Greenville, Mississippi Territory, Col. Daniel Burnet of Claiborne County, Reuben Morhous of Selsertown, James Caller of Tombigby, Gen. Thomas Overton near Nashville, Col. Joel Lewis near Nashville, Col. Ed. Douglass near Gallatin, Col. Joshua Baker of Wilkinson County, Dr. John Moore of Gibson Port, and John Baker of Fort Adams.

== Death ==
Fulton died in 1816 and is buried in Old Rapides Cemetery in Pineville, Louisiana.

== Sources ==
- Gates, Paul Wallace (May 1956). "Private Land Claims in the South". The Journal of Southern History. 22 (2): 183–204. doi:10.2307/2954238. ISSN 0022-4642. JSTOR 2954238. OCLC 558551244.
