= RMAS Magnet =

RMAS Magnet (A114) was the eponymous Royal Navy Magnet-class degaussing ship. She was completed in 1979 by Cleland.

== Class ==
As well as the Magnet, a sister ship, RMAS Lodestone was built by Cleland in 1980.

The Magnet class was developed to replace the Ham-class minesweepers that had been converted for degaussing. They are 828 tons gross register tonnage (GRT) and have a top speed of 14 knots (26 km/h; 16 mph). They measure 55 metres (180 ft 5 in) long with a beam of 12 metres (39 ft 4 in) and a draught of 4 metres (13 ft 1 in).
