= List of highways numbered 113 =

The following highways are numbered 113:

== Canada ==
- British Columbia Highway 113
- New Brunswick Route 113
- Nova Scotia Highway 113
- Prince Edward Island Route 113
- Quebec Route 113

== Costa Rica ==
- National Route 113

== Germany ==
- Bundesautobahn 113

== India ==
- National Highway 113 (India)

== Japan ==
- Route 113 (Japan)

== Philippines ==
- N113 highway (Philippines)

== United Kingdom ==
- A113 road
- B113 road

== United States ==
- U.S. Route 113
- Alabama State Route 113
  - County Route 113 (Lee County, Alabama)
- Arkansas Highway 113
- California State Route 113
- Colorado State Highway 113
- Connecticut Route 113
- Florida State Road 113
- Georgia State Route 113
- Illinois Route 113
- Indiana State Road 113 (former)
- Iowa Highway 113
- K-113 (Kansas highway)
- Kentucky Route 113
- Louisiana Highway 113
- Maine State Route 113
- Massachusetts Route 113
- M-113 (Michigan highway)
- Minnesota State Highway 113
- Missouri Route 113
- Nebraska Highway 113 (former)
- New Hampshire Route 113
  - New Hampshire Route 113A
  - New Hampshire Route 113B
- New Mexico State Road 113
- New York State Route 113
  - County Route 113 (Erie County, New York)
  - County Route 113 (Fulton County, New York)
  - County Route 113 (Herkimer County, New York)
  - County Route 113 (Steuben County, New York)
  - County Route 113 (Suffolk County, New York)
  - County Route 113 (Sullivan County, New York)
  - County Route 113 (Tompkins County, New York)
    - County Route 113A (Tompkins County, New York)
  - County Route 113 (Washington County, New York)
- North Carolina Highway 113
- Ohio State Route 113
- Oklahoma State Highway 113
- Pennsylvania Route 113
- Rhode Island Route 113
- South Carolina Highway 113
- Tennessee State Route 113
- Texas State Highway 113
  - Texas State Highway Loop 113 (former)
  - Texas State Highway Spur 113
    - Texas State Highway Spur 113 (1940–1948) (former)
  - Farm to Market Road 113
- Utah State Route 113
- Vermont Route 113
- Virginia State Route 113
  - Virginia State Route 113 (1923-1928) (former)
  - Virginia State Route 113 (1928-1933) (former)
  - Virginia State Route 113 (1933-1942) (former)
- Washington State Route 113
- Wisconsin Highway 113
- Wyoming Highway 113

Territories

- Puerto Rico Highway 113

== See also ==
- A113 road
- D113 road
- N-113 road (Spain)
- List of national roads in Latvia § P113
- R113 road (Ireland)
- S113 (Amsterdam)

Preceded by 112	Lists of highways 113	Succeeded by 114
