= A115 =

A115 or A.115 may refer to:

- A115 motorway (France)
- A 115 motorway (Germany)
- A115 road (Great Britain)
- Agusta A.115, a helicopter
- Ansaldo A.115, an Italian 1920s aircraft whose development lead to the 1925 Ansaldo A.120 aircraft
- RFA Airsprite (A115), a tanker ship
- RMAS Lodestone (A115), a degaussing ship
