= List of highways numbered 114 =

The following highways are numbered 114:

== Canada ==
- New Brunswick Route 114
- Prince Edward Island Route 114

== Costa Rica ==
- National Route 114

== Germany ==
- Bundesautobahn 114 (A114)

== India ==
- National Highway 114 (India)

== Japan ==
- Route 114 (Japan)

== Philippines ==
- N114 highway (Philippines)

== United Kingdom ==
- A114 road

== United States ==
- Alabama State Route 114
- Arkansas Highway 114
- California State Route 114
- Colorado State Highway 114
- Connecticut Route 114
- Florida State Road 114
- Georgia State Route 114
- Illinois Route 114
- Indiana State Road 114
- Iowa Highway 114 (1924–1968) (former)
- K-114 (Kansas highway)
- Kentucky Route 114
- Louisiana Highway 114
- Maine State Route 114
- Maryland Route 114 (former)
- Massachusetts Route 114
  - Massachusetts Route 114A
- M-114 (Michigan highway)
- Minnesota State Highway 114
- Missouri Route 114
- New Hampshire Route 114
  - New Hampshire Route 114A
- County Route 114 (Bergen County, New Jersey)
- New Mexico State Road 114
- New York State Route 114
  - County Route 114 (Dutchess County, New York)
  - County Route 114 (Fulton County, New York)
  - County Route 114 (Niagara County, New York)
  - County Route 114 (Onondaga County, New York)
  - County Route 114 (Steuben County, New York)
  - County Route 114 (Sullivan County, New York)
  - County Route 114 (Tompkins County, New York)
- North Carolina Highway 114
- Ohio State Route 114
- Oklahoma State Highway 114 (former)
- Pennsylvania Route 114
- Rhode Island Route 114
  - Rhode Island Route 114A
- South Carolina Highway 114
- Tennessee State Route 114
- Texas State Highway 114
  - Texas State Highway Loop 114 (former)
  - Texas State Highway Spur 114
    - Texas State Highway Spur 114 (1940–1950) (former)
  - Farm to Market Road 114
- Utah State Route 114
- Vermont Route 114
- Virginia State Route 114
  - Virginia State Route 114 (1923-1928) (former)
  - Virginia State Route 114 (1928-1933) (former)
- West Virginia Route 114
- Wisconsin Highway 114
- Wyoming Highway 114

Territories

- Puerto Rico Highway 114

== See also ==
- A114
- D114 road
- List of national roads in Latvia § P114
- R114 road (Ireland)
- R114 (South Africa)
- S114 (Amsterdam)

Preceded by 113	Lists of highways 114	Succeeded by 115
