= A114 =

A114 may refer to:

- RFA Derwentdale (A114), a ship
- A 114 motorway (Germany), a road connecting the A 10 (Berliner Ring) and the main center of Berlin
- A114 road (Malaysia), a road in Perak connecting Tanjung Tualang and Kampung Kuala Dipang
