= Arkansas Highway 115 (1926–1935) =

Former state highway in South Arkansas

State Road 115

Route information
- Maintained by AHD
- Length: 45 mi (72 km)
- Existed: April 1, 1926–1935

Major junctions
- South end: US 167 in El Dorado
- North end: US 167 in Thornton

Location
- Country: United States
- State: Arkansas
- Counties: Union, Calhoun

Highway system
- Arkansas Highway System; Interstate; US; State; Business; Spurs; Suffixed; Scenic; Heritage
| ← AR 114 | → AR 115 |

State Road 115 (AR 115, Ark. 115, and Hwy. 115) is a former state highway in South Arkansas. The route began at US Highway 167 (US 167) in El Dorado and ran north to US 79 in Thornton near Fordyce. The entire highway was supplanted by US 167 in 1935 following creation of US 79. State Road 115 was maintained by the Arkansas Highway Department (AHD), now known as the Arkansas Department of Transportation (ArDOT).

== History ==
The route was created during the 1926 Arkansas state highway numbering as an original state highway. When US 79 was created in 1935, it was designated along the former US 167. US 167 was shifted to State Road 115, replacing the entire route. The 115 designation was given to the former Arkansas Highway 79 in Northeast Arkansas, which was renumbered to 115 to avoid duplication with the newly created US 79.

== Major intersections ==
| County | Location | mi | km | Destinations | Notes |
|---|---|---|---|---|---|
| Union | El Dorado | 0 | 0.0 | US 167 / AR 2 / AR 15 | Southern terminus |
| Calhoun | Hampton | 28 | 45 | AR 4 (Main Street) – Camden, Warren | |
| Calhoun | Thornton | 45 | 72 | US 167 – Camden, Fordyce | Northern terminus |
1.000 mi = 1.609 km; 1.000 km = 0.621 mi: Concurrency terminus
