= Rapides Parish, Louisiana =

Parish in the United States

Coordinates: 31.20°N 92.54°W

- Parish
- Parish of Rapides; Paroisse des Rapides (French)
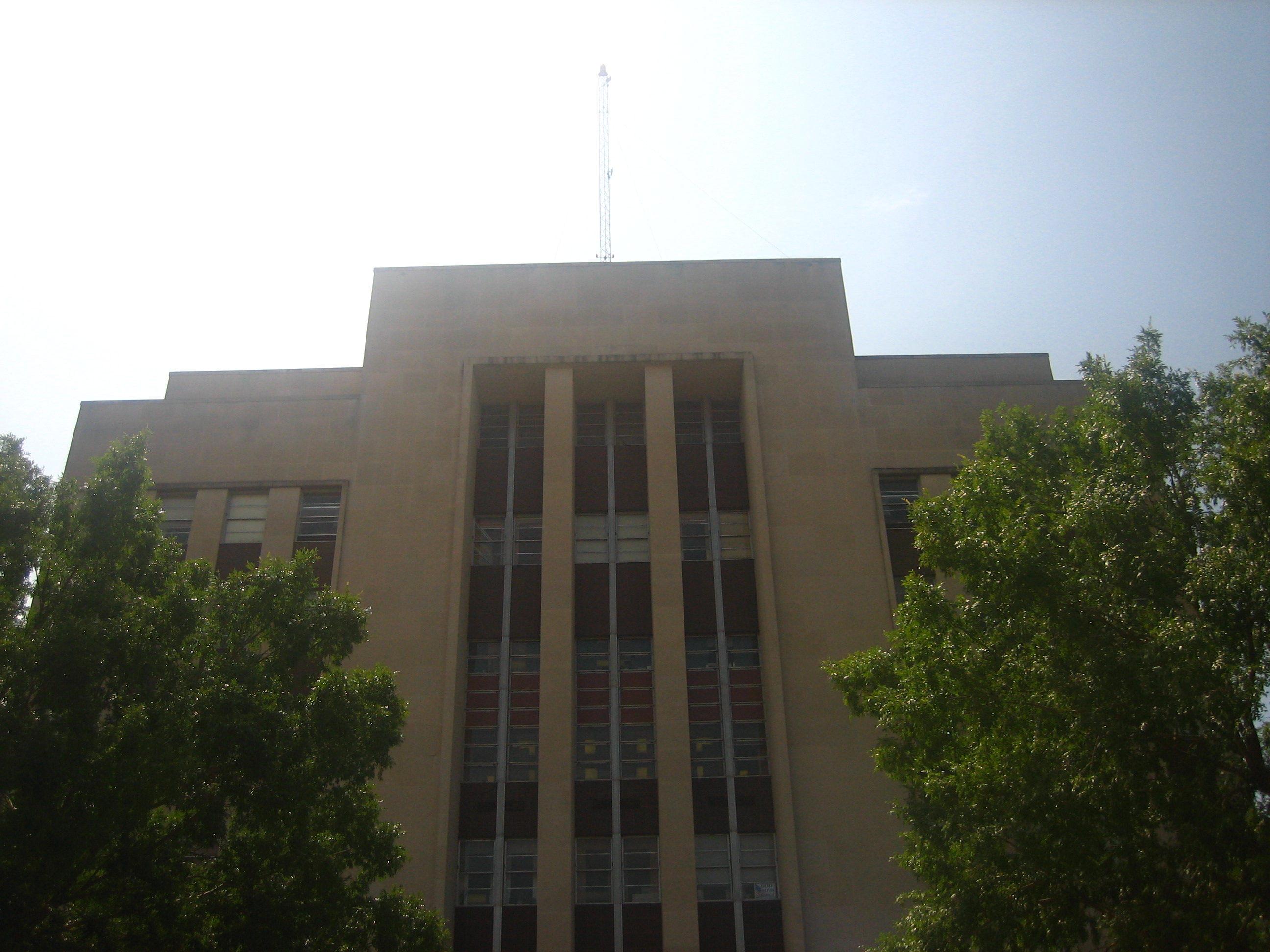
- Upper portion of the Rapides Parish Courthouse in Alexandria

- Flag

- Location within the U.S. state of Louisiana

- Louisiana's location within the U.S.
- Country: United States
- State: Louisiana
- Region: Central Louisiana
- Founded: 1807 (219 years ago)
- Named for: The local river rapids
- Parish seat (and largest city): Alexandria

Area
  - Total: 1,362 sq mi (3,530 km^{2})
  - Land: 1,318 sq mi (3,410 km^{2})
  - Water: 44 sq mi (110 km^{2})
  - percentage: 3.2 sq mi (8.3 km^{2})

Population (2020)
  - Total: 130,023
  - Estimate (2025): 125,877 ▼
  - Density: 98.65/sq mi (38.09/km^{2})
- Time zone: UTC-6 (CST)
  - Summer (DST): UTC-5 (CDT)
- Area code: 318/457
- Congressional district: 5th
- Website: Rapides Parish Police Jury

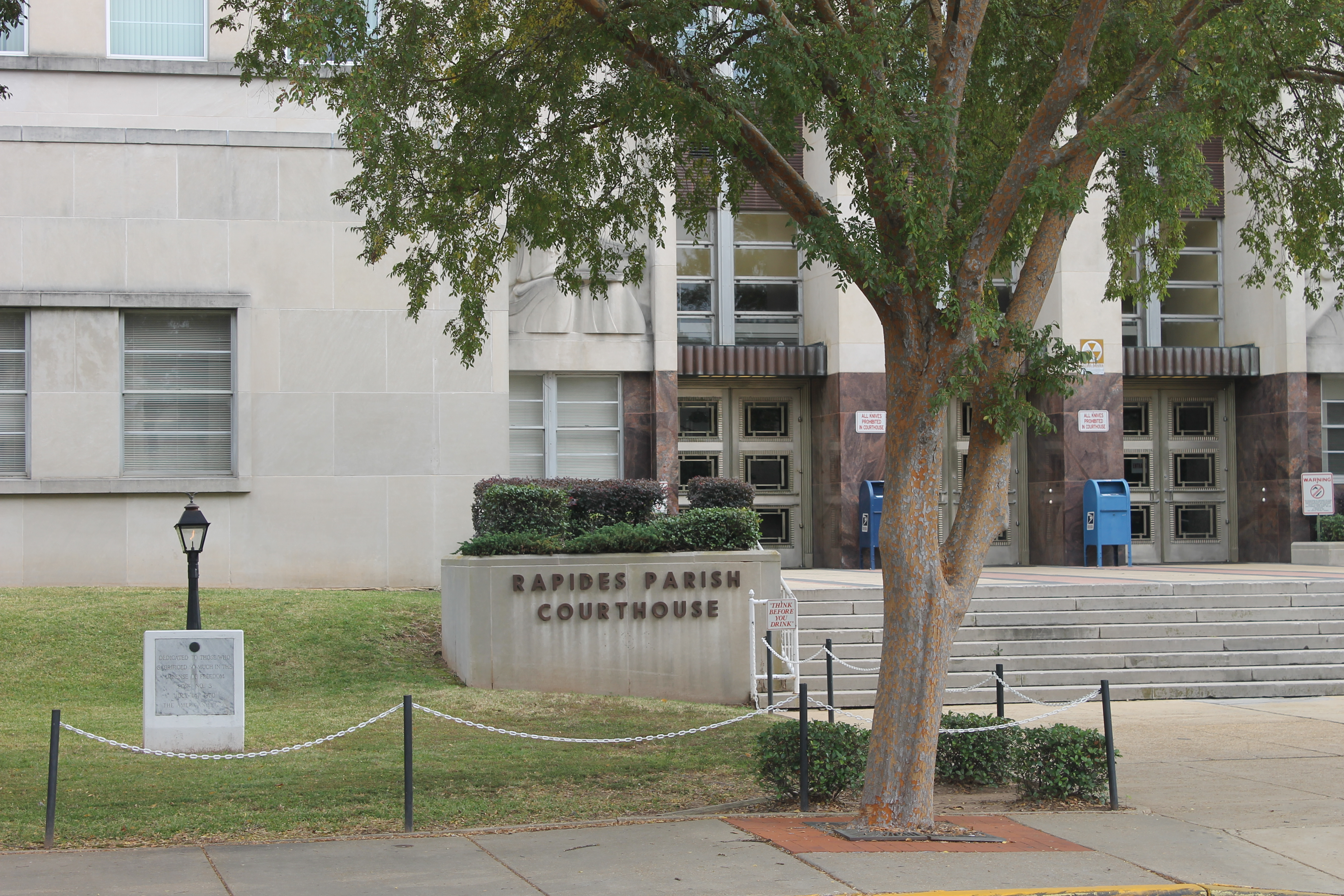
Lower view of the Rapides Parish Courthouse

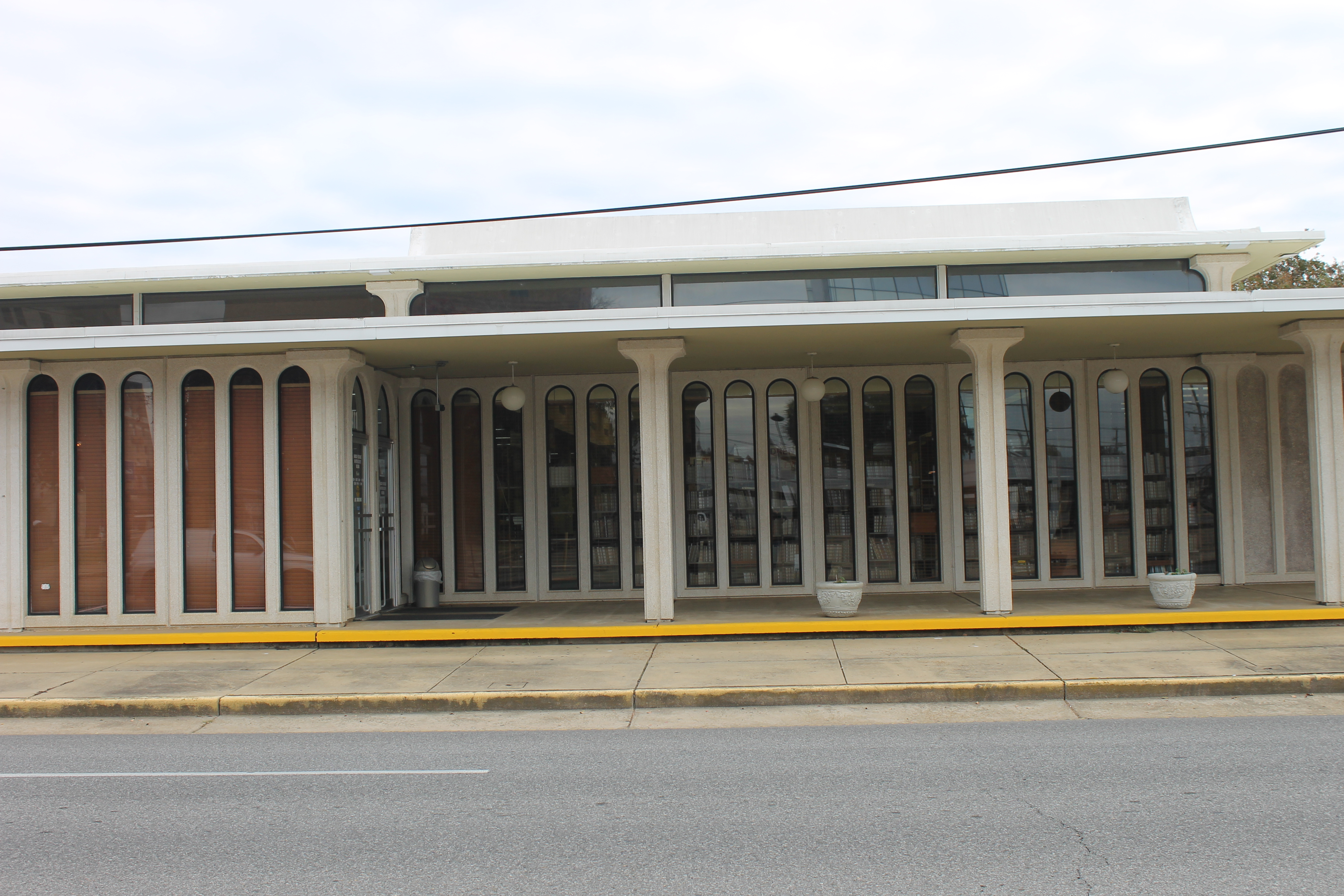
The main branch of the Rapides Parish Library is located in downtown Alexandria.

Rapides Parish (/ˈræpiːdz/) (French: Paroisse des Rapides) is a parish located in the U.S. state of Louisiana. As of the 2020 census, the population was 130,023. The parish seat and largest city is Alexandria, which developed along the Red River of the South. Rapides is the French word for "rapids". The parish was created in 1807 after the United States acquired this territory in the Louisiana Purchase.

Rapides Parish is included in the Alexandria metropolitan area, Louisiana.

== History ==
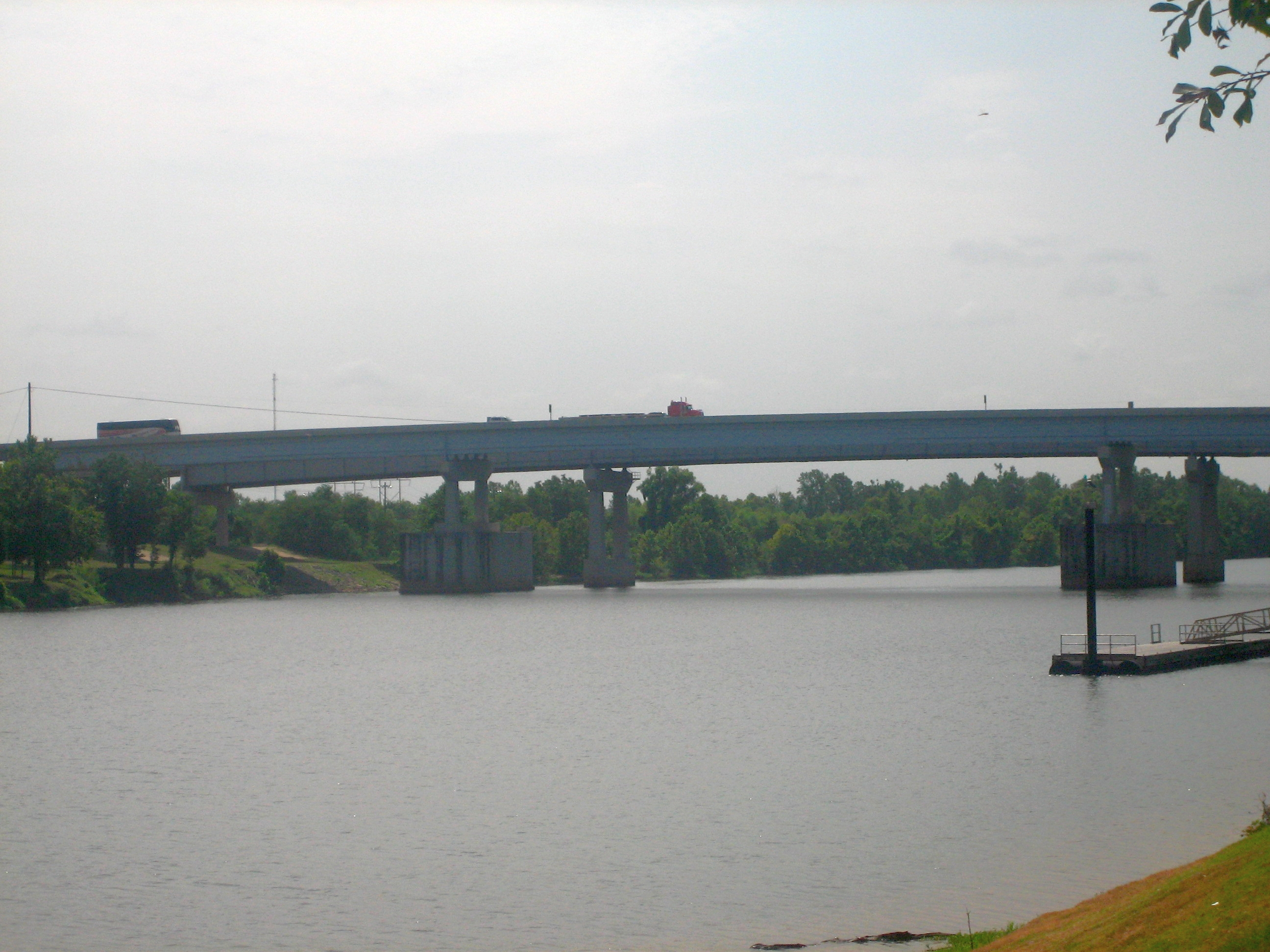
Purple Heart Memorial Bridge over the Red River in Alexandria and Pineville

In 1763, the land that is now Rapides Parish became the new home of the Apalachee tribe, who were settled there with the permission of Governor Kerlerec. Some Native Americans had come after fleeing the British and their Creek Indian allies from what is now Leon County, Florida. Many of their descendants remain in Natchitoches Parish.

The first French settler was Vincent Porei, who was granted a small tract of land in July 1764 by the Civil and Military Commander of Natchitoches. Nicolas Etienne Marafret Layssard arrived in December 1766, with the permission of Aubrey and Foucault, to establish a "tar works" in the pineries of Rapides, for naval stores. He was later appointed the first Civil Commander of Rapides Parish. During the 1760s, the area was still a dependency of Natchitoches Parish [AGI, PPC, Legajo 187a, 384-384v].

Parts of Catahoula Parish, Grant Parish, Vernon Parish, and Winn Parish were initially part of Rapides Parish territory, but they eventually separated and obtained land from neighboring parishes.

== Geography ==
According to the U.S. Census Bureau, the parish has a total area of 1,362 square miles (3,530 km^{2}), of which 1,318 square miles (3,410 km^{2}) is land and 44 square miles (110 km^{2}) (3.2%) is water. It is the largest parish in Louisiana by land area.

=== Water features ===
- Catahoula Lake
- Red River

=== Major highways ===
- Interstate 49
- U.S. Highway 71
- U.S. Highway 165
  - US 165 Bus.
- U.S. Highway 167
  - US 167 Bus.
- Louisiana Highway 1
- Louisiana Highway 8
- Louisiana Highway 28
  - LA 28 Bus.
- Louisiana Highway 107
- Louisiana Highway 112
- Louisiana Highway 113
- Louisiana Highway 115
- Louisiana Highway 116
- Louisiana Highway 119
- Louisiana Highway 121
- Louisiana Highway 180
- Louisiana Highway 181
- Louisiana Highway 454
- Louisiana Highway 456
- Louisiana Highway 457
- Louisiana Highway 461
- Louisiana Highway 462
- Louisiana Highway 463
- Louisiana Highway 465
- Louisiana Highway 470
- Louisiana Highway 488
- Louisiana Highway 496
- Louisiana Highway 497
- Louisiana Highway 498
- Louisiana Highway 623
- Louisiana Highway 1177
- Louisiana Highway 1198
- Louisiana Highway 1199
- Louisiana Highway 1200
- Louisiana Highway 1201
- Louisiana Highway 1203
- Louisiana Highway 1204
- Louisiana Highway 1205
- Louisiana Highway 1206
- Louisiana Highway 1207
- Louisiana Highway 1208-1
- Louisiana Highway 1208-2
- Louisiana Highway 1208-3
- Louisiana Highway 1208-4
- Louisiana Highway 1208-5
- Louisiana Highway 1243
- Louisiana Highway 1250
- Louisiana Highway 1254
- Louisiana Highway 1258
- Louisiana Highway 3054
- Louisiana Highway 3100
- Louisiana Highway 3128
- Louisiana Highway 3144
- Louisiana Highway 3170
- Louisiana Highway 3225
- Louisiana Highway 3250
- Louisiana Highway 3265

=== Adjacent parishes ===
- Grant Parish (north)
- La Salle Parish (northeast)
- Avoyelles Parish (east)
- Evangeline Parish (southeast)
- Allen Parish (southwest)
- Vernon Parish (west)
- Natchitoches Parish (northwest)

=== National protected area ===
- Kisatchie National Forest (part)

=== Military installations ===
- Esler Airfield (LA Army National Guard)
- Louisiana National Guard Training Center Pineville (LA Army National Guard)
- Camp Claiborne (defunct)
- Camp Livingston (defunct)
- England Air Force Base (defunct)

=== National Guard ===
- 225th Engineer Brigade

== Demographics ==
Historical population
Census	Pop.	Note	%±
1820	6,065		—
1830	7,575		24.9%
1840	14,132		86.6%
1850	16,561		17.2%
1860	25,360		53.1%
1870	18,015		−29.0%
1880	23,563		30.8%
1890	27,642		17.3%
1900	39,578		43.2%
1910	44,545		12.5%
1920	59,444		33.4%
1930	65,455		10.1%
1940	73,370		12.1%
1950	90,648		23.5%
1960	111,351		22.8%
1970	118,078		6.0%
1980	135,282		14.6%
1990	131,556		−2.8%
2000	126,337		−4.0%
2010	131,613		4.2%
2020	130,023		−1.2%
2025 (est.)	125,877	▼	−3.2%
U.S. Decennial Census; 1790-1960 1900-1990; 1990-2000 2010

=== Racial and ethnic composition ===
Rapides Parish, Louisiana – Racial and ethnic composition Note: the US Census treats Hispanic/Latino as an ethnic category. This table excludes Latinos from the racial categories and assigns them to a separate category. Hispanics/Latinos may be of any race.
Race / Ethnicity (NH = Non-Hispanic)	Pop 1980	Pop 1990	Pop 2000	Pop 2010	Pop 2020	% 1980	% 1990	% 2000	% 2010	% 2020
White alone (NH)	96,414	91,932	83,059	81,623	76,323	71.27%	69.88%	65.74%	62.02%	58.70%
Black or African American alone (NH)	36,031	36,667	38,298	41,937	40,261	26.63%	27.87%	30.31%	31.86%	30.96%
Native American or Alaska Native alone (NH)	429	528	892	968	901	0.32%	0.40%	0.71%	0.74%	0.69%
Asian alone (NH)	554	879	1,071	1,545	1,805	0.41%	0.67%	0.85%	1.17%	1.39%
Native Hawaiian or Pacific Islander alone (NH)	x	x	39	26	33	x	x	0.03%	0.02%	0.03%
Other race alone (NH)	225	24	91	138	459	0.17%	0.02%	0.07%	0.10%	0.35%
Mixed race or Multiracial (NH)	x	x	1,148	1,958	5,151	x	x	0.91%	1.49%	3.96%
Hispanic or Latino (any race)	1,629	1,526	1,739	3,418	5,090	1.20%	1.16%	1.38%	2.60%	3.91%
Total	135,282	131,556	126,337	131,613	130,023	100.00%	100.00%	100.00%	100.00%	100.00%

=== 2020 census ===
As of the 2020 census, there were 130,023 people living in the parish, the median age was 39.3 years, 24.0% of residents were under the age of 18, and 17.6% were 65 years of age or older. For every 100 females there were 93.3 males, and for every 100 females age 18 and over there were 89.9 males.

The racial makeup of the parish was 59.6% White, 31.1% Black or African American, 0.8% American Indian and Alaska Native, 1.4% Asian, <0.1% Native Hawaiian and Pacific Islander, 1.8% from some other race, and 5.3% from two or more races. Hispanic or Latino residents of any race comprised 3.9% of the population.

60.2% of residents lived in urban areas, while 39.8% lived in rural areas.

There were 51,268 households and 32,667 families residing in the parish; 31.7% of households had children under the age of 18 living in them, 41.4% were married-couple households, 18.6% were households with a male householder and no spouse or partner present, and 33.8% were households with a female householder and no spouse or partner present. About 29.4% of all households were made up of individuals and 13.0% had someone living alone who was 65 years of age or older.

There were 57,935 housing units, of which 11.5% were vacant. Among occupied housing units, 65.0% were owner-occupied and 35.0% were renter-occupied. The homeowner vacancy rate was 1.4% and the rental vacancy rate was 9.6%.

=== 2010 census ===
In 2010, there were 131,613 people living in the parish. 63.3% were White, 25.0% Black or African American, 1.83% Asian, 2.15% Native American, 1.56% of some other race and 1.88% of two or more races. 6.85% were Hispanic or Latino (of any race).

=== 2000 census ===
In 2000, there were 126,337 people, 47,120 households, and 33,125 families living in the parish. The population density was 93 inhabitants per square mile (36/km^{2}). There were 52,038 housing units at an average density of 39 per square mile (15/km^{2}). The racial makeup of the parish was 66.51% White, 30.43% Black or African American, 0.74% Native American, 0.86% Asian, 0.04% Pacific Islander, 0.42% from other races, and 1.01% from two or more races. 1.38% of the population were Hispanic or Latino of any race.

There were 47,120 households, out of which 34.60% had children under the age of 18 living with them, 49.70% were married couples living together, 16.80% had a female householder with no husband present, and 29.70% were non-families. 26.00% of all households were made up of individuals, and 10.30% had someone living alone who was 65 years of age or older. The average household size was 2.56 and the average family size was 3.09.

In the parish the population was spread out, with 27.20% under the age of 18, 9.50% from 18 to 24, 27.90% from 25 to 44, 22.40% from 45 to 64, and 13.10% who were 65 years of age or older. The median age was 36 years. For every 100 females, there were 91.70 males. For every 100 females age 18 and over, there were 88.00 males.

The median income for a household in the parish was $29,856, and the median income for a family was $36,671. Males had a median income of $29,775 versus $20,483 for females. The per capita income for the parish was $16,088. About 16.40% of families and 20.50% of the population were below the poverty line, including 26.30% of those under age 18 and 16.30% of those age 65 or over.

== Infrastructure and politics ==
The Louisiana Department of Public Safety & Corrections formerly operated the J. Levy Dabadie Correctional Center on property adjacent to Louisiana National Guard Training Center Pineville in Pineville in Rapides Parish. The facility closed in July 2012.

=== Politics ===
Since the late 20th century, conservative whites have mostly shifted from the Democratic Party, long in control in Louisiana and other Deep South states, to the Republican Party. The population of Alexandria is heavily Democratic, but voters in the white-majority Rapides Parish frequently favor Republican candidates in competitive presidential elections. In 2012, Republican Mitt Romney carried the parish with 37,193 votes (64.1 percent), compared to Democrat U.S. President Barack Obama's 20,045 (34.6 percent). The 2012 results in Rapides Parish were similar to those of 2008. Republican Senator John McCain won the parish with 36,611 votes (63.6 percent) to President Obama's 20,127 (35 percent).

With 58.8 percent and 63.8 percent, respectively, George W. Bush carried Rapides Parish in both 2000 and 2004 over the Democrats, Vice President Al Gore and John F. Kerry. The last Democrat to win at the presidential level in Rapides Parish was Bill Clinton, who in 1996 received 23,004 votes (46.1 percent) to Robert J. Dole's 21,548 (43.2 percent). Ross Perot, founder of the Reform Party, received 4,670 ballots (9.4 percent). In 2016, Hillary Clinton suffered the worst defeat for a Democratic candidate in the parish since Walter Mondale in 1984. This is in contrast to the fact that her husband, Bill, won the parish in 1996 during his reelection bid.

United States presidential election results for Rapides Parish, Louisiana
Year	Republican		Democratic		Third party(ies)	
Year	No.	%	No.	%	No.	%
1912	46	2.75%	1,334	79.78%	292	17.46%
1916	134	5.72%	2,184	93.25%	24	1.02%
1920	445	13.86%	2,765	86.11%	1	0.03%
1924	1,022	31.06%	2,159	65.62%	109	3.31%
1928	2,494	35.81%	4,470	64.19%	0	0.00%
1932	680	8.23%	7,578	91.77%	0	0.00%
1936	1,257	13.55%	8,017	86.45%	0	0.00%
1940	869	8.72%	9,100	91.28%	0	0.00%
1944	1,712	15.79%	9,132	84.21%	0	0.00%
1948	1,707	13.07%	4,730	36.22%	6,623	50.71%
1952	9,749	41.80%	13,576	58.20%	0	0.00%
1956	9,105	53.84%	5,961	35.25%	1,845	10.91%
1960	8,155	34.29%	9,651	40.58%	5,976	25.13%
1964	18,122	64.46%	9,992	35.54%	0	0.00%
1968	10,199	28.95%	8,793	24.96%	16,239	46.09%
1972	22,306	69.68%	8,422	26.31%	1,283	4.01%
1976	17,766	45.25%	20,851	53.10%	647	1.65%
1980	25,576	55.24%	19,436	41.98%	1,290	2.79%
1984	32,879	65.81%	16,121	32.27%	963	1.93%
1988	29,977	61.31%	17,928	36.67%	986	2.02%
1992	22,783	43.91%	20,873	40.23%	8,226	15.86%
1996	21,548	43.16%	23,004	46.07%	5,379	10.77%
2000	28,831	58.81%	18,898	38.55%	1,295	2.64%
2004	34,492	63.79%	18,904	34.96%	673	1.24%
2008	36,611	63.65%	20,127	34.99%	783	1.36%
2012	37,193	64.10%	20,045	34.55%	781	1.35%
2016	36,816	64.77%	18,322	32.23%	1,706	3.00%
2020	38,347	65.14%	19,475	33.08%	1,043	1.77%
2024	36,171	67.74%	16,537	30.97%	687	1.29%

== Education ==
Rapides Parish School Board operates public schools.

Louisiana State University of Alexandria is in Alexandria.

Louisiana Christian University is located in Pineville.

Rapides Parish is in the service area of Central Louisiana Technical Community College.

== Communities ==
=== Cities ===
- Alexandria (parish seat and largest municipality)
- Pineville

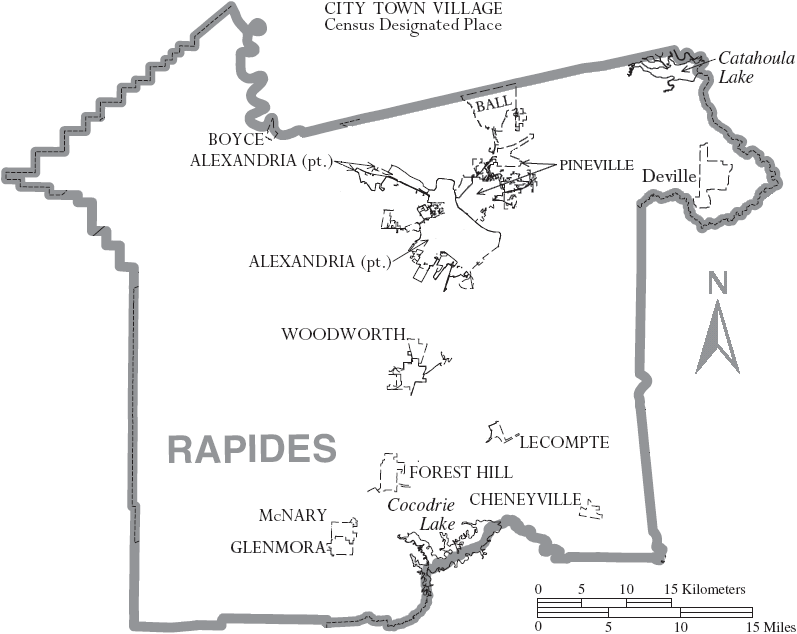
Map of Rapides Parish, with municipal labels

=== Towns ===
- Ball
- Boyce
- Cheneyville
- Glenmora
- Lecompte
- Woodworth

=== Villages ===
- Forest Hill
- McNary

=== Unincorporated areas ===
==== Census-designated Place ====
- Deville
- Echo

==== Unincorporated communities ====
- Buckeye
- Clifton
- Elmer
- Flatwoods
- Gardner
- Hineston
- Kolin
- Lena
- Libuse
- Melder
- Otis
- Poland
- Ruby
- Sieper
- Tioga

== Gallery ==
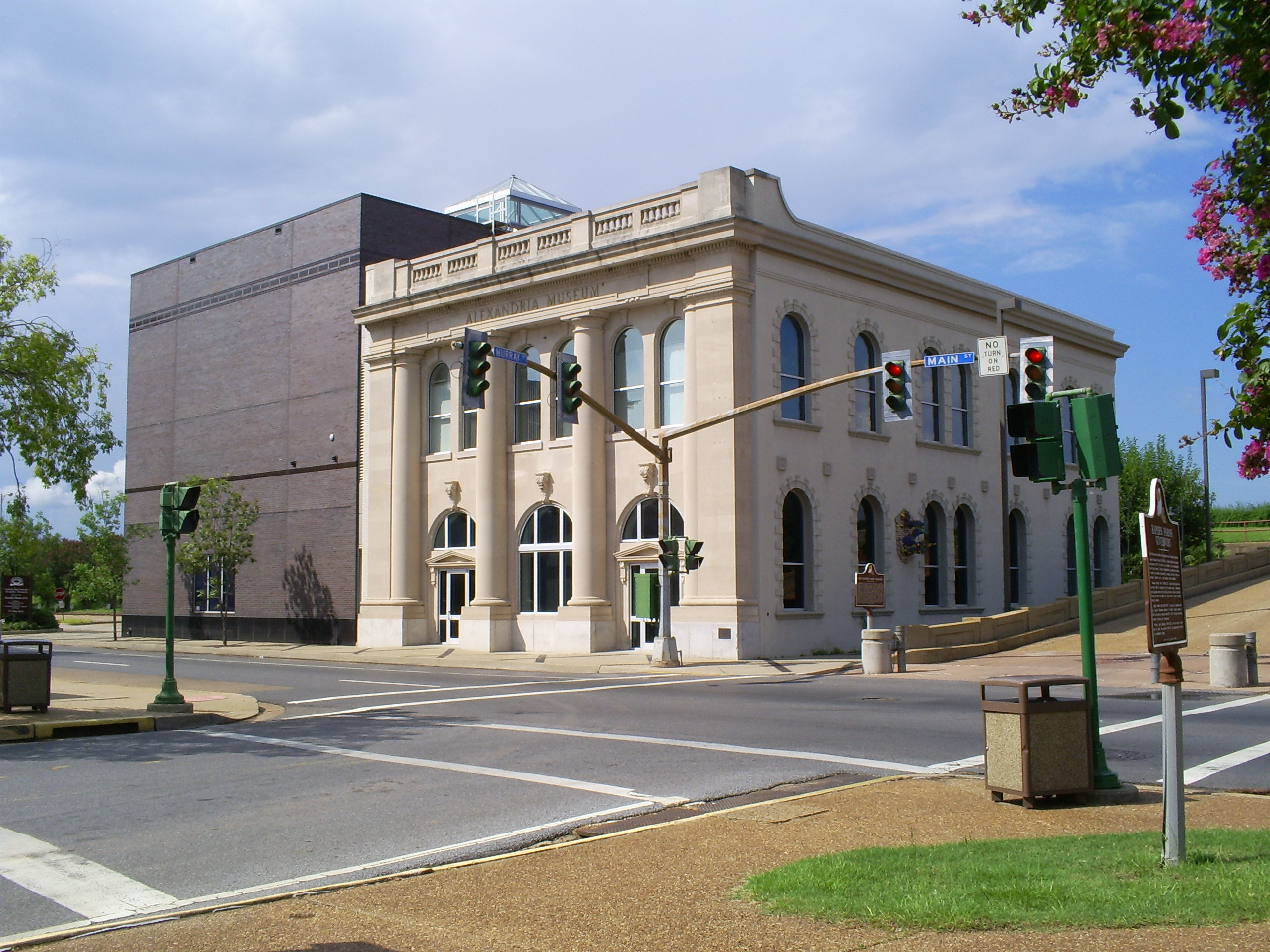
A view of the Alexandria museum in Rapides Parish, Louisiana, USA

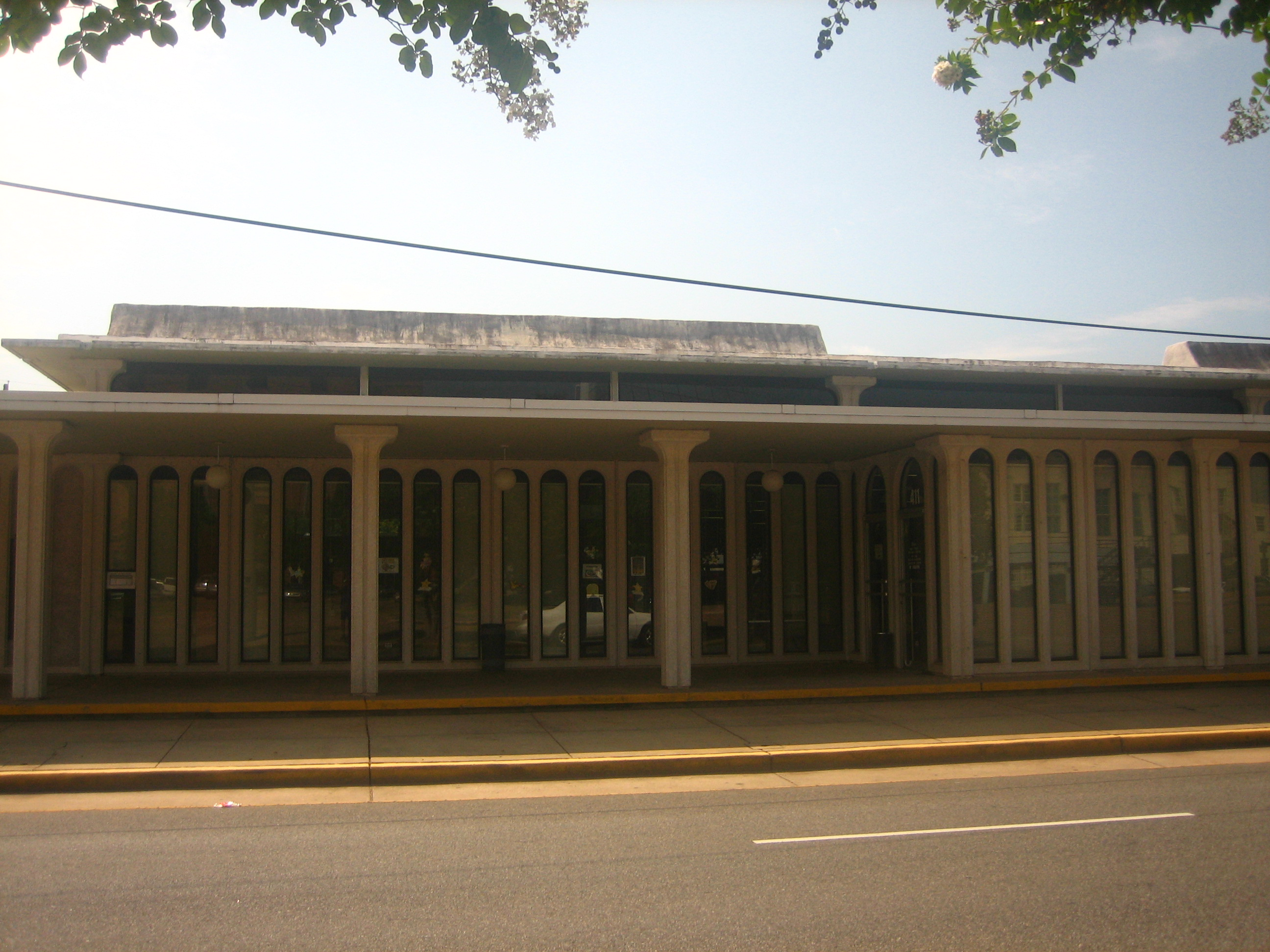
Rapides Parish Library at Alexandria

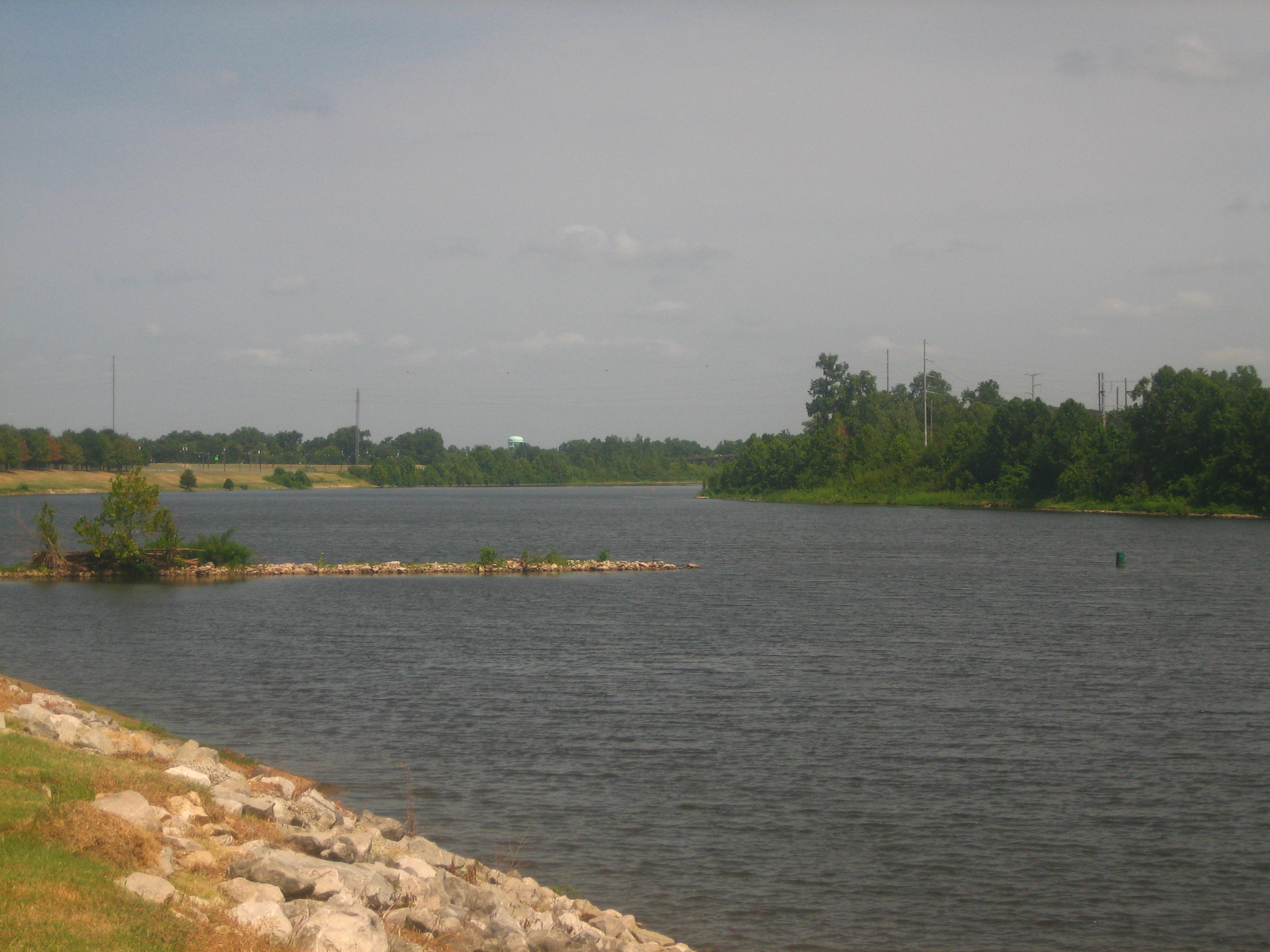
Red River at Alexandria

== See also ==
- National Register of Historic Places listings in Rapides Parish, Louisiana
- Jay Chevalier
- Bill Cleveland
- Palustris Experimental Forest
