= A116 =

A116 may refer to:

- A116 road (Malaysia), a road in Perak connecting Sungai Lesong and Temoh
- A116 road (Russia), a road in Russia connecting Soltsi and Veliky Novgorod
