= Louisiana Highway 116 =

State highway in Louisiana, United States

Louisiana Highway 116
- Esler Field Road
- Route of LA 116 highlighted in red

Route information
- Maintained by Louisiana DOTD
- Length: 8.388 mi (13.499 km)
- Existed: 1955 renumbering–present

Major junctions
- West end: US 165 in Pineville
- East end: LA 28 east of Pineville

Location
- Country: United States
- State: Louisiana
- Parishes: Rapides

Highway system
- Louisiana State Highway System; Interstate; US; State; Scenic
← LA 115	→ LA 117
← SR 308	309	→ SR 310

Louisiana Highway 116 (LA 116) is a state highway located in Rapides Parish, Louisiana. It runs 8.39 miles (13.50 km) in an east–west direction from U.S. Highway 165 (US 165) in Pineville to LA 28 at a point east of Pineville.

The route connects the city of Pineville, as well as the rural area in the northeast corner of the parish, with Esler Regional Airport. Pineville is located opposite the Red River from Alexandria, central Louisiana's largest city. Formerly the area's main airport, Esler is now primarily used as a training ground by the Louisiana National Guard.

== Route description ==
From the west, LA 116 begins at an intersection with US 165 (Monroe Highway) just within the northern city limit of Pineville. US 165 connects to Monroe on the north and heads through Pineville to Alexandria on the south. LA 116 proceeds northeast on Esler Field Road and passes by Louisiana National Guard Training Center Pineville, a U.S. Army and Louisiana National Guard training area. East of the Training Center, LA 116 travels through a forested rural area for about 2.5 miles (4.0 km) before entering an area of scattered residential development known as Green Gables.

2.0 miles (3.2 km) east of Libuse Cutoff Road, LA 116 meets the west entrance of Esler Regional Airport, a small airfield primarily used by the Louisiana National Guard. Here, the highway makes a curve to the southeast and reaches the south entrance of the airport. LA 116 then curves to the south and travels for 1.5 miles (2.4 km) through an unpopulated and thickly forested area before ending at an intersection with LA 28. The eastern terminus is located 7.6 miles (12.2 km) east of the Pineville Expressway, where LA 28 begins a concurrency with US 167 into downtown Alexandria. To the northeast, LA 28 connects with US 84 to Jonesville and points near the Mississippi state line.

The route is classified by the Louisiana Department of Transportation and Development (La DOTD) as an urban minor arterial from the western terminus to Flagon Bayou near Green Gables and a rural major collector from there to the eastern terminus. The average daily traffic volume in 2013 is reported as 8,300 from US 167 to a point just west of Esler Regional Airport, decreasing to 3,100 for the remainder of the route. LA 116 has a posted speed limit of 45 mph (70 km/h) within the Pineville city limits and 55 mph (90 km/h) in rural Rapides Parish. It is an undivided, two-lane highway for its entire route.

== History ==
=== Pre-1955 route numbering ===
State Route 309
- Location: Rapides Parish
- Length: 6.6 mi (10.6 km)
- Existed: 1928–1955

In the original Louisiana Highway system in use between 1921 and 1955, the modern LA 116 was designated as State Route 309.

Route 309. Beginning on State Highway Route No. 14 near Kingville and extending via La. State National Guard Camp (Camp Beauregard) to the Artillery Range of said Camp Beauregard.

— 1928 legislative route description

Route 309 was created in 1928 by an act of the state legislature. The western terminus at Camp Beauregard (now Louisiana National Guard Training Center Pineville) was originally a junction with both US 165 and State Route 14, which were co-signed north of Alexandria. The location was at that time outside the Pineville city limits in an area known as Kingsville. Route 309 extended in a straight line to what was then the artillery range of Camp Beauregard, 6.6 miles (10.6 km) distant. In the early 1940s, this became the site of Esler Army Airfield, now known as Esler Regional Airport.

The portion of the current LA 116 extending south from the airport to LA 28 (formerly State Route 123) did not exist during the pre-1955 era. However, an eastern extension of the route was designated in 1930 as State Route 623, which did connect to Route 123 at nearby Holloway. Route 623 was eventually eliminated, and state maintenance once again ended on Route 309 at Esler Army Airfield until the 1955 Louisiana Highway renumbering.

=== Post-1955 route history ===
LA 116 was created in 1955 as a direct renumbering of State Route 309.

La 116—From a junction with La-US 165 at or near Kingsville easterly to a point at or near Esler Army Airfield entrance.

— 1955 legislative route description

Lengthy route concurrencies were eliminated in the renumbering, and the western terminus was now a junction with US 165 only.

In 1971, LA 116 was extended southward along a newly-constructed roadway from Esler Army Airfield to an intersection with LA 28 east of Pineville. During the 1970s, Esler became the principal commercial airport in the Alexandria area, and the extension provided better access to traffic originating east of the city. Since then, the route has remained the same, although the western terminus at Kingsville is now within the Pineville city limits.

== Major intersections ==
The entire highway is in Rapides Parish.

Location	mi	km	Destinations	Notes
Pineville	0.000– 0.123	0.000– 0.198	US 165 (Monroe Highway) – Alexandria, Monroe	Western terminus
	8.388	13.499	LA 28 – Alexandria, Jonesville	Eastern terminus
1.000 mi = 1.609 km; 1.000 km = 0.621 mi
