= RMAS Lodestone =

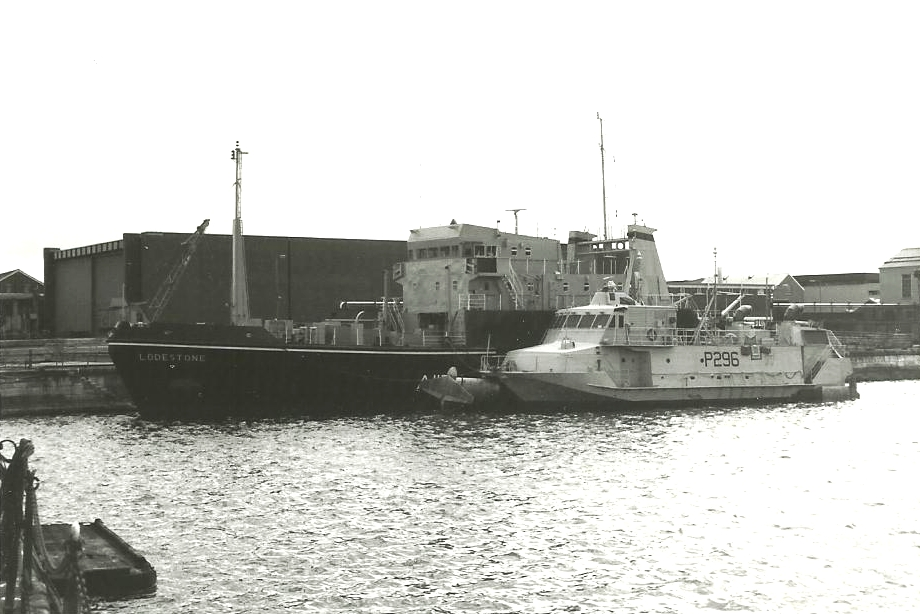
RMAS Lodestone alongside (behind) HMS Speedy (P296) in 1982

RMAS Lodestone (A115) was a Magnet-class Royal Navy degaussing ship. She was completed in 1980 by the Clelands Shipbuilding Company.

The Magnet-class was developed to replace the Ham-class minesweepers that had been converted for degaussing. They are 828 gross tonnage (GT) and have a top speed of 14 knots. They measure 55m x 12m x 4m.

== Bleu de Nîmes ==
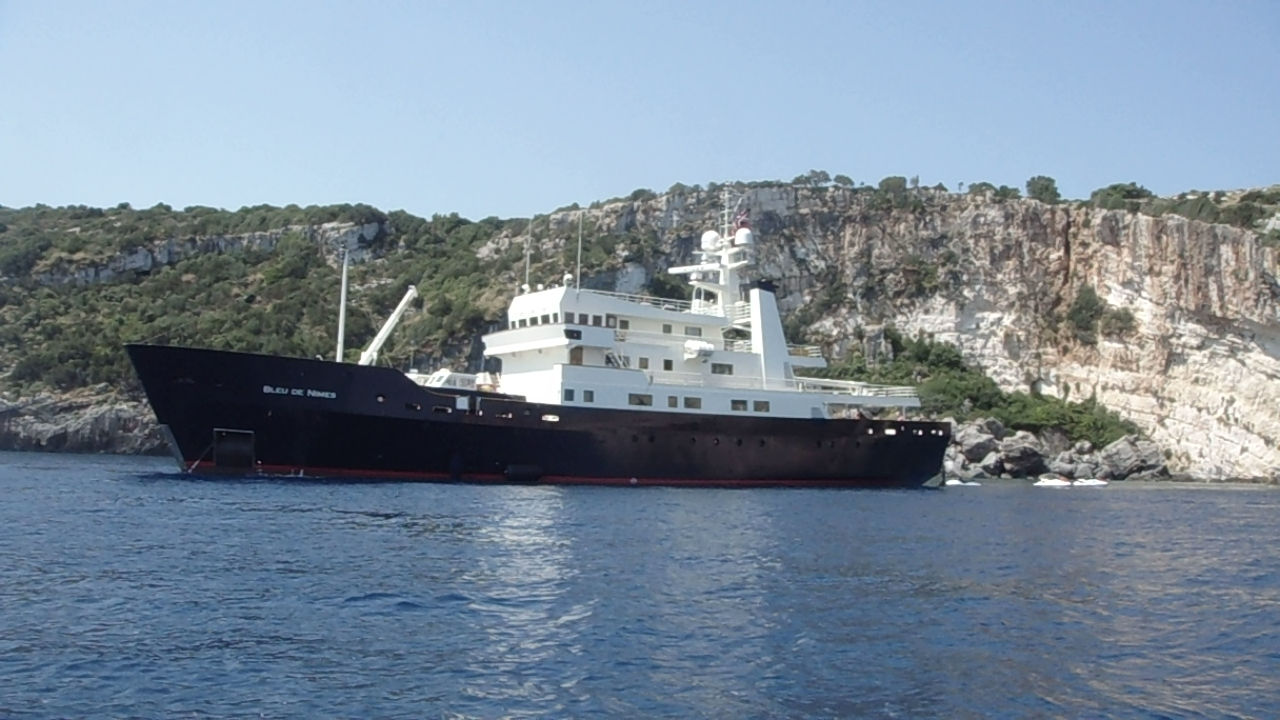
Bleu de Nîmes in 2013

In 1997 she was sold to an Italian millionaire and towed initially to Devonport for conversion to a luxury yacht, the Bleu de Nîmes (IMO 7813913).

The extensive rebuild in Turkey was completed in 2005. Another rebuild in Italy completed in 2020 increased her length by 16 metres to 72.25 metres (237 ft).

In February 2022 she was chartered by the government of Mauritius for a fifteen day expedition to the Chagos Archipelago following international court rulings that Mauritius is sovereign there.

== See also ==
- RMAS Magnet (A114)
