= Surath =

- Suratha Raja
- Religion: Hinduism

Suratha is a legendary character in mythology. He is a proverbial person of Hindu lore. He was a devotee of Devi Durga. According to the Markandeya Purana he preached the Devi Mahatmya (Sri Sri Chandi) in Marthya (earth) among the dweller of Marthya and also he was the first organizer of durga puja in Prachya-Ganga and later this durga puja festival became popular in other parts of India.
