= Thomas A. Lemoine House =

Thomas A. Lemoine House may refer to:

- Thomas A. Lemoine House (Hamburg, Louisiana), listed on the National Register of Historic Places in Avoyelles Parish, Louisiana
- Thomas A. Lemoine House (Moreauville, Louisiana), listed on the National Register of Historic Places in Avoyelles Parish, Louisiana
