= St. Paul Baptist Church =

St. Paul Baptist Church or St. Paul's Baptist Church may refer to:

- St. Paul Baptist Church (Tarboro, North Carolina)
- St. Paul Baptist Church (St. Albans, West Virginia)
- St. Paul Baptist Church-Morehead School, Kinder, LA, listed on the NRHP in Louisiana
- St. Paul Baptist Church and Cemetery, Meeker, OK, listed on the NRHP in Oklahoma
- St. Paul's Baptist Church (Paris, Texas), listed on the NRHP in Texas
