= Leon Green =

American legal scholar (1888–1979)

A. Leon Green (March 31, 1888 – June 15, 1979) was an American legal realist, a pioneer in Tort law, nationally known writer and scholar, and dean of Northwestern University School of Law for 38 years. Through his efforts, Northwestern had one of the strongest law schools in the United States during the 1930s and the 1940s. He also served as professor at Yale Law School and the University of Texas School of Law. Green wrote the "groundbreaking book, The Rationale of Proximate Cause, in 1927.

== Early life ==
Green was born in Oakland, Union Parish, Louisiana on March 31, 1888. His parents were Emily Frances (née McCormick) and William Morris Green. He attended Ouachita College where he received an A.B. in 1908 He enrolled in the University of Texas School of Law in Austin, Texas. While working on his law degree, Green started the firm of Rector and Green in Austin; this partnership lasted from 1912 until 1915. He received an LL.B from the University of Texas in 1915.

== Career ==
After graduating from law school, Green taught at the University of Texas School of Law. He started a private practice in Dallas and Fort Worth, Texas in 1918. However, he closed his practice in 1920 and became a full-time professor at the University of Texas School of Law. While at Texas, he was one of the founders of the Texas Law Review and developed a stock scheme to fund the new publication. When sales of stock slowed, Green spoke at a Texas Bar Association meeting on July 6, 1922, explaining the needs for the journal and its funding; his presentation secured the needed investors to start the publication.

Green accepted the position of dean of the University of North Carolina School of Law in 1926, but later turned it down for a year-long visiting professorship at Yale University. His position at Yale became permanent in 1927. Green became a leading expert in Tort law and authored the groundbreaking treatise, The Rationale of Proximate Cause in 1927.

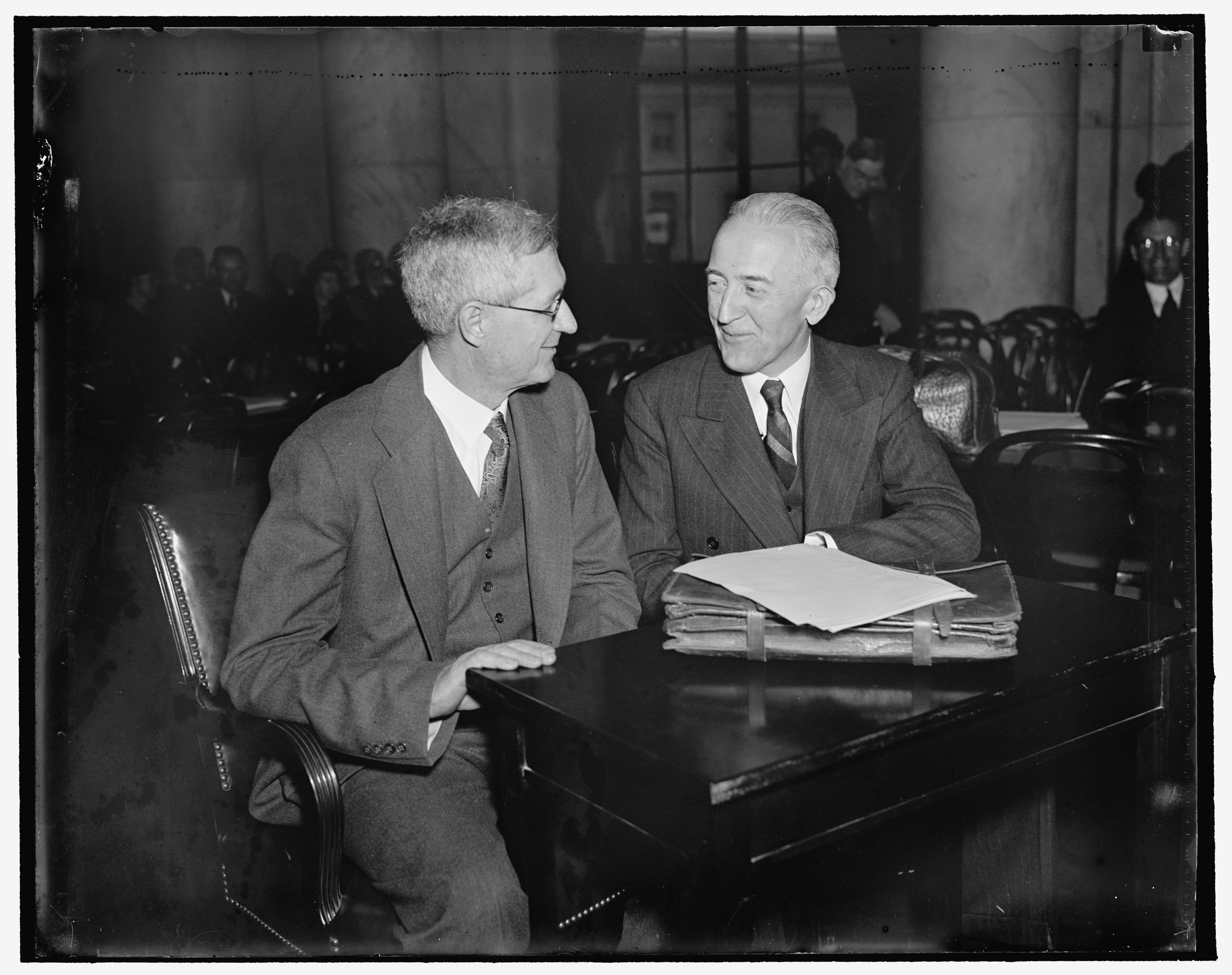
Green (right) before the Senate Judicairy Committee with Charles Grove Haines (left) of the University of California

In 1929, Green became the dean of the Northwestern University Law School where he built one of the strongest law schools in the United States during the 1930s and the 1940s. Green presided over curriculum changes to provide students with effective and innovative training in the changing field of law. His curriculum expanded beyond traditional casework and also included practical work at the university's Legal Clinic and Scientific Crime Detection Laboratory. Students were also encouraged to interact with bar associations and to editor and contribute to the Illinois Law Review. Green also determined that the best way to raise the law school's stature was to raise the quality of students and fought University pressure to raise revenues by admitting unqualified students. He also formed a faculty of "unusual stature", increased the faculty from six to sixteen, and secured donors to provide scholarships so that poorer students and to build a new facility for the school.

Green testified before the Senate Judiciary Committee in favor of the Judicial Procedures Reform Bill of 1937, the so-called "court-packing" bill that aimed to increase the number of justices of the Supreme Court of the United States, believing it would increase the court's sensitivity to the people's needs. In a 1937 magazine interview, he provided a controversial analysis of employee sitdown strikes. He also pushed for changes in the Illinois Bar Exam; his students often had a higher failure rate than laws school with a lower reputation who were teaching to the exam rather than for the advance the legal profession. The failure of Northwestern students caused problems for Green with both law school alumni and university officials, but he maintained with issue was with a dated exam rather than his curriculum. Despite these controversies, Green was allowed to retain his position at Northwestern University.

Green was a professor at the University of Texas from 1947 to 1977, except the 1958 to 1959 school year when he taught at the University of California Hastings College of Law. He frequently contributed to legal periodicals and was also an editorial advisor for the Journal of Criminal Law & Criminology. Much of his scholarly writing was a criticism of the doctrine of proximate cause. After his retirement, he was a professor emeritus of law at the University of Texas.

== Professional affiliations ==
Green was a member of the American Bar Association, the Chicago Bar Association, the Connecticut Bar Association, the Illinois State Bar Association, and the State Bar of Texas. He was a member of the legal honorary society, Order of the Coif, and served as its national secretary-treasurer from 1963 to 1970. He also belonged to the American Association of University Professors.

Green received honorary degrees from Louisiana State University, Northwestern University, and Yale University.

== Personal life ==
Green married Notra Anderson in 1909. The couple had two children, a son Leon Jr., and a daughter Nevin. He was a member of Phi Delta Phi, the Philosophical Society of Texas, and the Democratic party. He was also a Unitarian. Green died at the age of 91 in Austin, Texas, on June 15, 1979. He was buried in the Austin Memorial Park.

== Legacy ==
Three of Green's students received appointments to the United States Supreme Court: John Paul Stevens and Arthur Goldberg from Northwestern University, and Thomas Campbell Clark from the University of Texas. In 2012, Stevens spoke of Green, saying:

He was both an intimidating and inspiring teacher, who made his students stand when responding to his interrogation about assigned cases. His theory, I believe, was that if a student could not withstand the pressure of intense, hostile questioning on his feet in class, he would never survive in a courtroom. Under Dean Green's leadership, Northwestern provided its students with what I think of as a vertical rather than horizontal education, placing greater emphasis on procedure and the differing roles of judges and juries in different categories of cases than on the content of the black-letter rules that supposedly apply across the board in all types of cases...I am sure that there are countless Texas lawyers who share my admiration for Leon Green and for his writing about judges and juries.

Texas Law Review, which he help establish, is still in publication as his 1927 "groundbreaking book, The Rationale of Proximate Cause. Green's papers are part of the archives at the Tarlton Law Library at the University of Texas at Austin and Northwestern University Archival and Manuscript Collection. The Texas Law Review Association occasionally presents the Leon Green Award, its highest honor, for contributions to the legal profession.

== Selected publications ==
- The Rationale of Proximate Cause. Kansas City, Mo.: Vernon Law Book Company, 1927.
- Judge and Jury. Kansas City, Mo: Vernon Law Book Co., 1930.
- The Judicial Process in Tort Cases. St. Paul: West Publishing Co., 1931.
- Cases on Injuries to Relations. Rochester: The Lawyers Co-operative Publishing Company, 1940.
- The Walter-McCarran Law: Police-State Terror Against Foreign-Born Americans. New York: New Century Publishers, 1953.
- Traffic Victims: Tort Law and Insurance. Evanston, Illinois: Northwestern University Press, 1958.
- The Litigation Process in Tort Law. Indianapolis: Bobbs-Merrill, 1965.
- The Litigation Process in Tort Law: No Place to Stop in the Development of Tort Law. 2nd ed. Indianapolis: Bobbs-Merrill, 1977. ISBN 0672828367
- The Correspondence Between Leon Green and Charles McCormick, 1927-1962. David W. Robertson and Robin Meyer, editors. Littleton, Colorado: Fred B. Rothman & Co., 1988. ISBN 0837710464
