= National Register of Historic Places listings in Allen Parish, Louisiana =

Location of Allen Parish in Louisiana

Allen Parish, Louisiana, United States, has four properties listed on the National Register of Historic Places.

The locations of National Register properties for which the latitude and longitude coordinates are included below may be seen in a map.

This National Park Service list is complete through NPS recent listings posted August 28, 2026.

== Current listings ==
	Name on the Register	Image	Date listed	Location	City or town	Description
1	Allen Parish Courthouse	Allen Parish Courthouse	June 3, 1981 (#81000287)	Head of 6th Avenue; 30°37′13″N 92°46′05″W	Oberlin	
2	Elizabeth Hospital Building	Elizabeth Hospital Building	January 18, 1985 (#85000092)	230 Poplar Street; 30°51′54″N 92°47′44″W	Elizabeth	Now serves as Elizabeth Town Hall.
3	Genius Brothers Building	Genius Brothers Building	June 27, 1990 (#90000909)	Corner of 8th Street and 4th Avenue; 30°29′14″N 92°51′01″W	Kinder	
4	St. Paul Baptist Church-Morehead School	St. Paul Baptist Church-Morehead School	July 6, 2005 (#05000686)	772 Hickory Flats Road; 30°32′57″N 92°49′26″W	Kinder vicinity	

== See also ==
- List of National Historic Landmarks in Louisiana
- National Register of Historic Places listings in Louisiana
