= Elizabeth Hospital Building =

- U.S. National Register of Historic Places
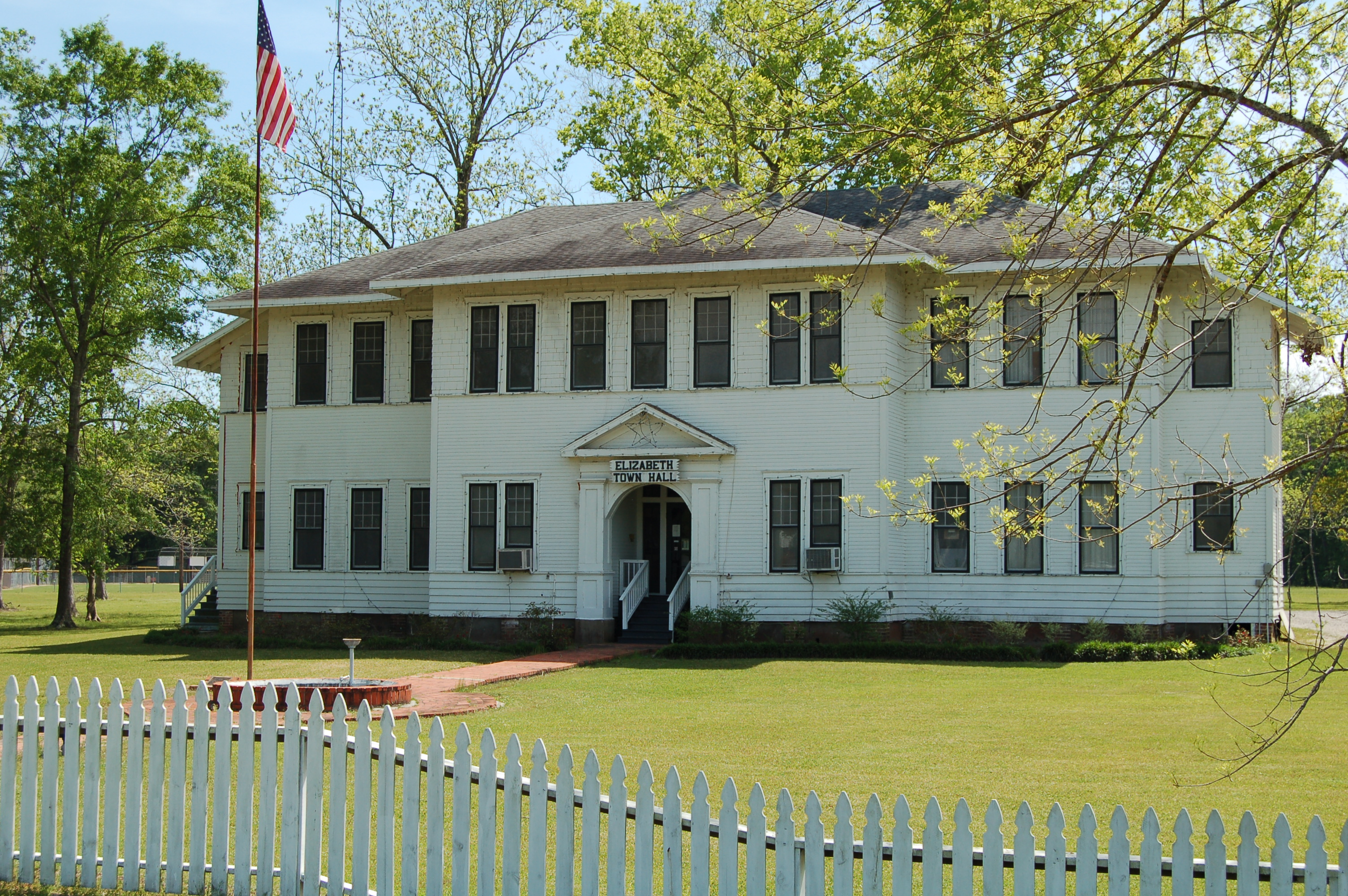
- Identified as Elizabeth Town Hall in 2005

- Location within Louisiana
- Location: 230 Poplar Street, Elizabeth, Louisiana
- Coordinates: 30.8649°N 92.79551°W
- Area: 0.8 acres (0.32 ha)
- Built: 1924
- Built by: Industrial Lumber Company
- Architectural style: Colonial Revival
- NRHP reference No.: 85000092
- Added to NRHP: January 18, 1985

The Elizabeth Hospital Building, at what is now 230 Poplar Street in Elizabeth, Louisiana, was apparently built in 1924.

Elizabeth was a sawmill town founded and platted by the Industrial Lumber Company in 1907, within a 70,000 acres (28,000 ha) area of long leaf yellow pine that the company acquired in 1905. The huge Elizabeth mill started operation in 1909, and Elizabeth became the company's headquarters. It supervised the lumber mill's production capacity of up to 160,000 board-feet of lumber daily (using one shift), and 150,000 board-feet of daily capacity in two other mills at Oakland (about 180 miles north in Union Parish) plus more in a mill in Vinton (about 80 miles southwest), all connected by company-built railroads.

In 1907 the company owned mills in nearby Oakdale and in Vinton. To expand production, in 1907 it opened a new mill at Elizabeth, in a 70,500 acres (28,500 ha) parcel of long leaf yellow pine that the firm acquired in 1905. It platted a mill site and town site, and opened operation in 1909.

The Industrial Lumber Company's mill at Elizabeth processed 160,000 board feet per day. Given how the lumber industry operated in Louisiana at that time, this mill, like others, likely ran for only a few years, producing vast amounts of lumber until all the available forest in the area was clearcut.

The hospital building, a two-story frame structure, has a stone at its front steps dated 1924, though it may be older. The date 1924 may mark when it was restored or rebuilt after a fire. The building is 11 bays wide and two rooms deep, with a central corridor. It has "a central aedicule motif arched entrance under a pediment", and its "exterior features three different types of clapboarding, which lends a subtle textured effect". It is somewhat Colonial Revival in style."

By 1985, the town included only residential buildings (50 to 75 workers' cottages, and several larger houses presumed to have been for managers), the hospital, the company-built Methodist church, and "a Catholic church which may or may not have been built by Industrial".

In 1985 the hospital building of the town was deemed "locally significant in the area of industry because it best represents the community's origins and early history as a lumber company town".

In 1985 it was the Elizabeth Town Hall, in Town of Elizabeth. Before the 2020 census it became Village of Elizabeth.

In 2022, the building is still identified by sign above its front door as Elizabeth Town Hall.

== See also ==
- Oakland, Union Parish, Louisiana: also established by the Industrial Lumber Company
- National Register of Historic Places listings in Allen Parish, Louisiana
