= DeSoto Parish Courthouse =

- U.S. National Register of Historic Places
- U.S. Historic district – Contributing property
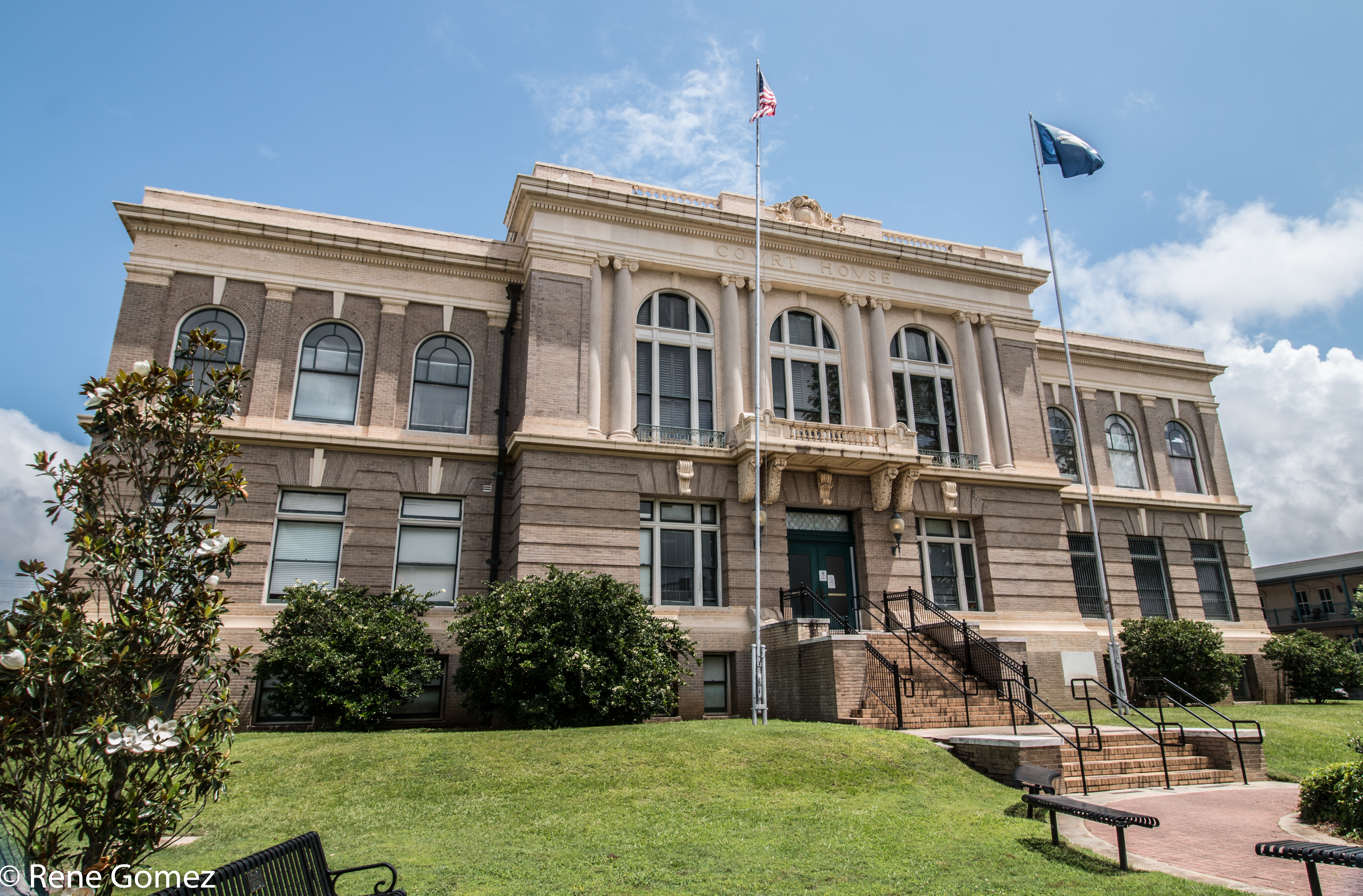

- Location within Louisiana
- Interactive map showing the location of DeSoto Parish Courthouse
- Location: Jct. of Adams and Texas Sts., Mansfield, Louisiana
- Coordinates: 32.03867°N 93.71046°W
- Area: 1 acre (0.40 ha)
- Built: 1911
- Architect: Favrot & Livaudais
- Architectural style: Beaux Arts
- Part of: Mansfield Historic District (ID88002067)
- NRHP reference No.: 86003677

Significant dates
- Added to NRHP: January 22, 1987
- Designated CP: October 27, 1988

The DeSoto Parish Courthouse, at 101 Texas Street in Mansfield, Louisiana in DeSoto Parish, Louisiana, was listed on the National Register of Historic Places in 1987.

It was designed by Favrot & Livaudais in Beaux Arts style and was built in 1911.

It is a three-story brick building

articulated with two principal stories raised on an English basement. The building is approached on all four sides via monumental flights of steps. The central main entrance is accented by a balustraded balcony on heavy consoles. The entrance leads to a central hall which in turn leads to axial corridors running to the ends of the building. Each side wing culminates in an imperial staircase leading to the courtroom on the top story. The presence of the courtroom is expressed on the exterior through the use of a higher central block with three great arched windows. The main block also features coupled Ionic columns and an ornamental parapet culminating in a central sculptural cartouche. The side wings, which are lower than the main block, are articulated with Tuscan pilasters and arched windows. The piano nobile rests upon a rusticated brick base with a heavy water table.

Its interior is now fairly plain, as courtroom ornamentation has been removed or hidden, and lowered ceilings have been installed in many areas.

It is also a contributing property of Mansfield Historic District since its creation on October 27, 1988.

== See also ==
- Allen Parish Courthouse: also designed by Favrot & Livaudais
- Lafourche Parish Courthouse: also designed by Favrot & Livaudais
- National Register of Historic Places listings in DeSoto Parish, Louisiana
