= Lafourche Parish Courthouse =

- U.S. National Register of Historic Places
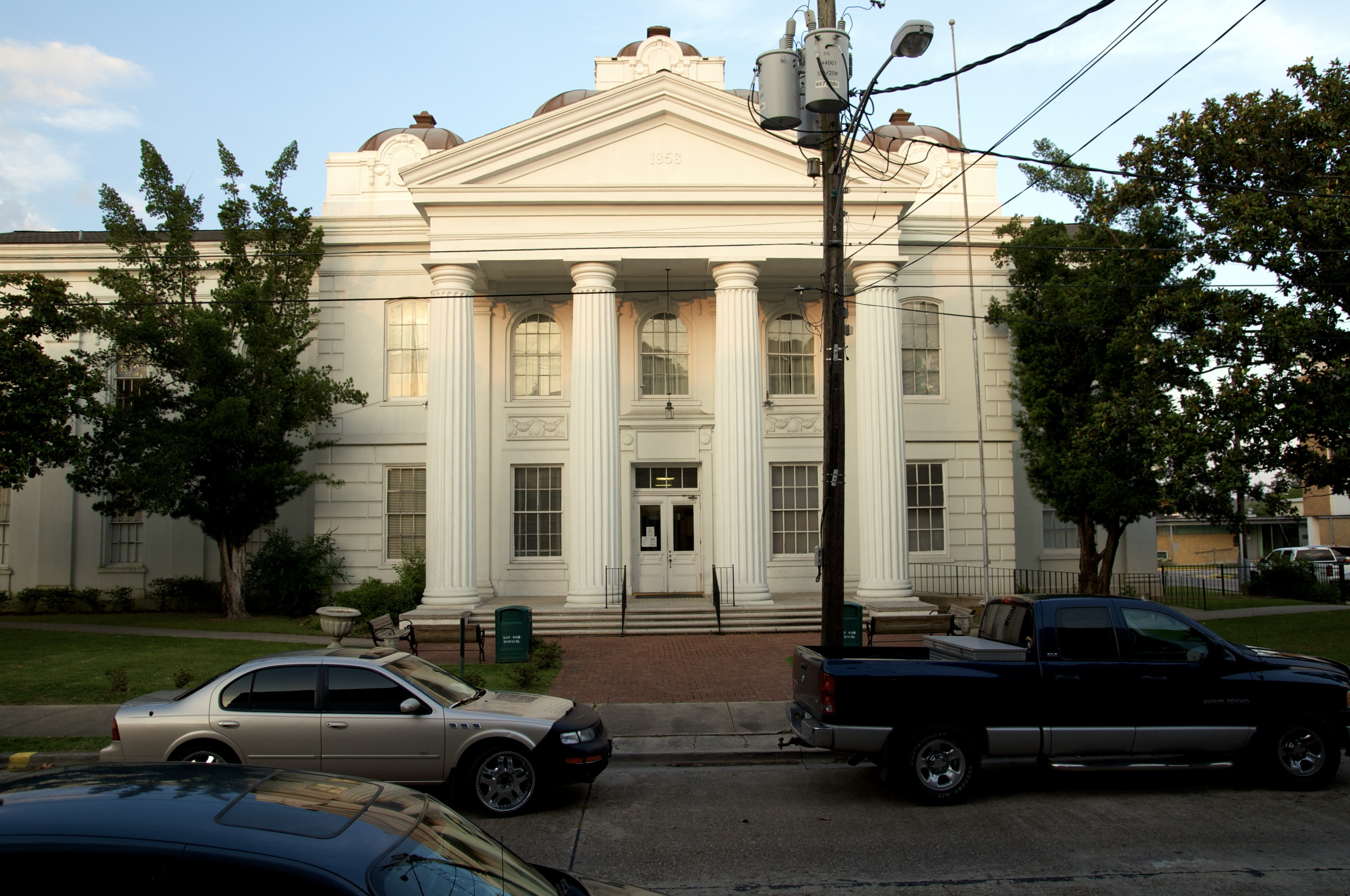

- Location within Louisiana Location within the United States
- Location: 200 Green Street, Thibodaux, Louisiana
- Coordinates: 29°47′52″N 90°49′11″W
- Area: 2 acres (0.81 ha)
- Built: 1858
- Architect: Favrot & Livaudais
- Architectural style: Beaux-Arts
- NRHP reference No.: 79001068
- Added to NRHP: August 21, 1979

The Lafourche Parish Courthouse is a historic building located at 200 Green Street in Thibodaux, Louisiana. It serves as the courthouse for Lafourche Parish, Louisiana.

Built in 1858, the structure was "remodeled" in 1903 and 1959. It was designed in the Beaux-Arts architectural style by New Orleans architects Favrot & Livaudais.

It has been listed on the National Register of Historic Places since August 21, 1979.

== See also ==
- Allen Parish Courthouse: also designed by Favrot & Livaudais
- DeSoto Parish Courthouse: also designed by Favrot & Livaudais
- National Register of Historic Places listings in Lafourche Parish, Louisiana
