= Allen Parish Courthouse =

- U.S. National Register of Historic Places
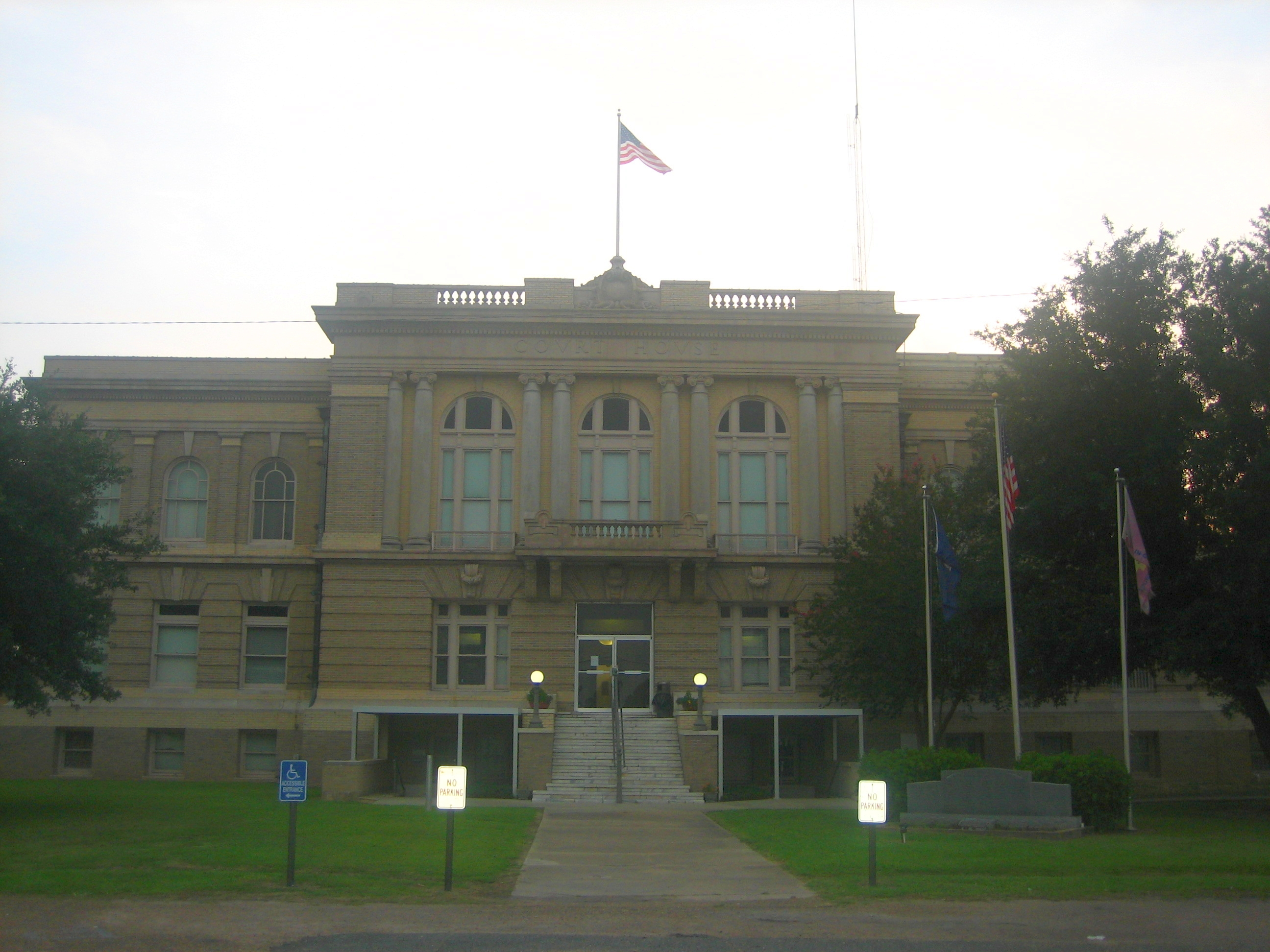

- Location within Louisiana
- Interactive map showing the location of Allen Parish Courthouse
- Location: Head of 6th Avenue, Oberlin, Louisiana
- Coordinates: 30°37′13″N 92°46′05″W
- Area: 1 acre (0.40 ha)
- Built: 1912
- Architect: Favrot & Livaudais
- Architectural style: Classical Revival, Classical Baroque
- NRHP reference No.: 81000287
- Added to NRHP: June 3, 1981

The Allen Parish Courthouse in Oberlin, Louisiana is the courthouse of Allen Parish, Louisiana which was built in 1912. It was listed on the National Register of Historic Places in 1981.

It is a tall two-story brick building set on "an English basement", with architecture in "a robust style which was inspired by the Classical Baroque". Its second floor has four sets of double Ionic columns setting off three arch windows that illuminate the courtroom inside. The courthouse dominates Oberlin, commanding it from its position at the end of an avenue and from its tall height relative to one-story commercial buildings of the town. It has been the seat of parish government since its construction.

== See also ==
- DeSoto Parish Courthouse: also designed by Favrot & Livaudais
- Lafourche Parish Courthouse: also designed by Favrot & Livaudais
- National Register of Historic Places listings in Allen Parish, Louisiana

== See also ==
- National Register of Historic Places listings in Allen Parish, Louisiana
