= Strand Theatre (Jennings, Louisiana) =

- U.S. National Register of Historic Places
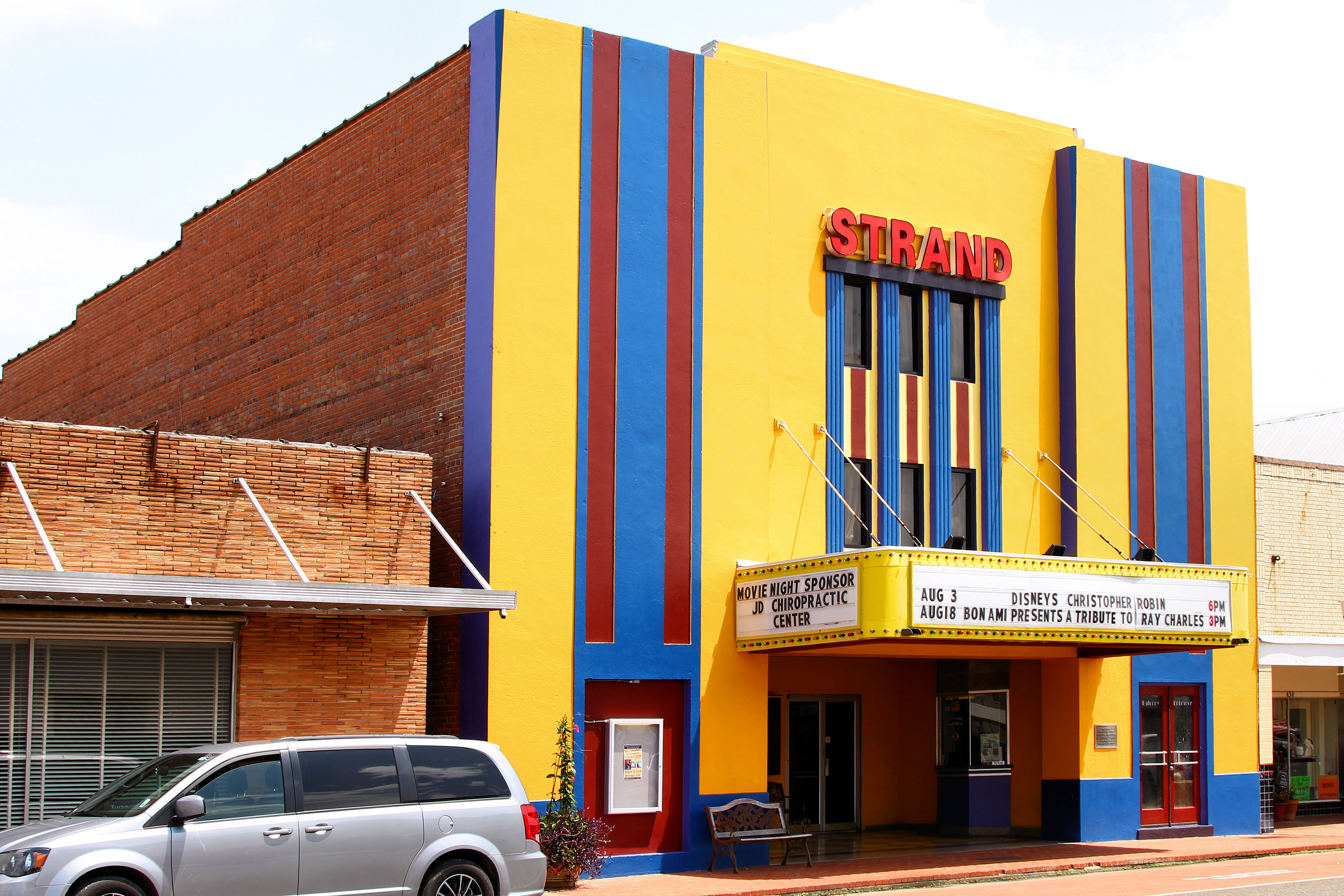

- Location within Louisiana Location within the United States
- Location: 432 N. Main St., Jennings, Louisiana
- Coordinates: 30°13′27″N 92°39′28″W
- Area: less than one acre
- Built: 1939
- Architect: Favrot, Reed, and Fred
- Architectural style: Moderne
- NRHP reference No.: 98001360
- Added to NRHP: November 12, 1998

The Strand Theatre in Jennings, Louisiana, at 432 N. Main St., was built in 1939. It was listed on the National Register of Historic Places in 1998.

It is a Moderne-style building designed by architects Favrot, Reed, and Fred.

It was the only theatre open in Jennings during most of 1939 to 1948.
