= Favrot & Livaudais =

Architectural firm (defunct)

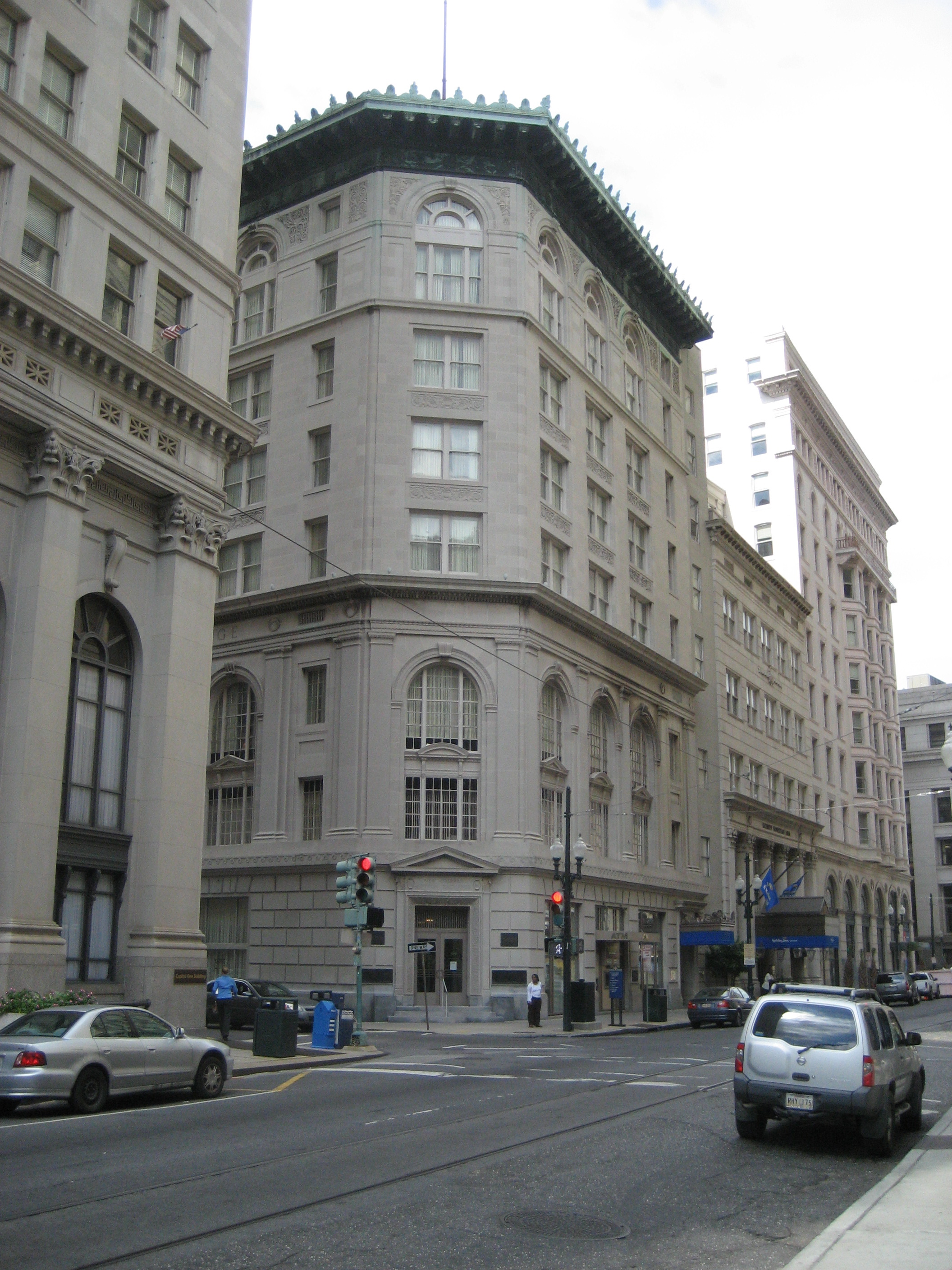
New Orleans Cotton Exchange Building, on Carondelet Street in New Orleans

Favrot & Livaudais (1891–1933) was an architectural firm in New Orleans, Louisiana. The firm designed many buildings that are listed on the National Register of Historic Places.

The firm was founded in 1891 by Charles Favrot (1866-1939) and Louis A. Livaudais (1870-1932). Charles Favrot was the son-in-law to architect, James Freret. Louis Livaudais had worked with Freret sometime before the two decided to join together to start their own architectural practice.

The firm closed in 1933 after Livaudais died. Favrot continued with firms including Favrot & Reed, and Favrot, Reed, and Fred, and Favrot, Reed, Mathes & Bergman.

== Select works ==
=== Listed on the National Register of Historic Places ===
- New Orleans Cotton Exchange Building, 231 Carondelet St., New Orleans, Louisiana (Favrot & Livaudais Ltd.)
- Allen Parish Courthouse, 5th St., Oberlin, Louisiana (Favrot & Livaudais)
- Bolton High School, 2101 Vance Ave., Alexandria, Louisiana (Favrot & Livaudais)
- Calcasieu Marine Bank, 840 Ryan St., Lake Charles, Louisiana (Favrot & Livaudais)
- Calcasieu Parish Courthouse, Ryan St. at Kirby St., Lake Charles, Louisiana (Favrot & Livaudais)
- Cathedral of the Immaculate Conception (Lake Charles, Louisiana), 935 Bilbo St., Lake Charles, Louisiana (Favrot & Livaudais)
- DeSoto Parish Courthouse, Jct. of Adams and Texas Sts., Mansfield, Louisiana (Favrot & Livaudais)
- Emmanuel Baptist Church (Alexandria, Louisiana), 430 Jackson St., Alexandria, Louisiana (Favrot & Reed)
- Fuquay Hardware Store Building, 358 Third St., Baton Rouge, Louisiana (Favrot and Livaudais)
- Gay, Andrew H., House, 1010 McDuffie St., Plaquemine, Louisiana (Favrot and Livaudais)
- Golden Meadow High School, 630 S. Bayou Dr., Golden Meadow, Louisiana (Favrot & Livaudais)
- Gordon Hotel, 108-110 E. Vermilion St., Lafayette, Louisiana (Favrot & Livaudais)
- Isaacs-Williams Mansion, 5120 St. Charles Ave., New Orleans, Louisiana (Favrot & Livadais)
- Joffrion House, 605 N. Monroe, Marksville, Louisiana (Favrot & Livaudais)
- Lafourche Parish Courthouse, 200 Green St, Thibodaux, Louisiana (Favrot & Livaudais)
- Lake Charles City Hall, Old, Ryan St. at Kirby St., Lake Charles, Louisiana (Favrot & Livaudais)
- Lake Charles Historic District, Roughly bounded by Iris, Hodges, Lawrence, Kirkman, S. Division and Louisiana, Lake Charles, Louisiana (Favrot & Livaudais)
- Thomas A. Lemoine House (Moreauville, Louisiana), Louisiana Highway 451, Moreauville, Louisiana (Favrot & Livaudais)
- Montegut Elementary School (Montegut, Louisiana) 1137 Hwy 55, Montegut Louisiana, NRHP listed
- Mount's Villa, off Louisiana Highway 22, Ponchatoula, Louisiana (Favrot & Livaudais)
- Napoleon Street Branch Library, Napoleon St., New Orleans, Louisiana (Favrot & Livaudais)
- Nicholls, Francis T., Junior College Main Building, 906 Louisiana Highway 1 E, Thibodaux, Louisiana (Favrot and Reed)
- Oaks Hotel, SW Railroad Ave., Hammond, Louisiana (Favrot & Livaudais)
- Rapides Opera House, 1125 3rd St., Alexandria, Louisiana (Favrot & Livaudais)
- Roumain Building, 343 Riverside Mall, Baton Rouge, Louisiana (Favrot & Livaudais)
- Southern University Historic District, Netterville Dr. and Swan Ave., Baton Rouge, Louisiana (Favrot & Livaudais)
- Strand Theatre (Jennings, Louisiana), 432 N. Main St., Jennings, Louisiana (Favrot, Reed, and Fred)
- Women's Gymnasium, Northwestern State University, College Ave., Natchitoches, Louisiana (Favrot & Livaudais)

=== Other ===
- Favrot House, 805 N. 9th St. Baton Rouge, Louisiana, Spanish Town Historic District (Charles Favrot)
- Hibernia Bank Building, 812 Gravier Street, New Orleans, Louisiana (Favrot & Livaudais)
- Globe Theatre Building, 614 Canal Street, New Orleans, Louisiana (Favrot & Livaudais), 1916-1964
- Strand Theatre Building, 229 Baronne Street, New Orleans, Louisiana (Favrot & Livaudais), 1917-1960
- Hyams Monument, Metairie Cemetery, New Orleans
