= Calcasieu Parish Courthouse =

- U.S. National Register of Historic Places
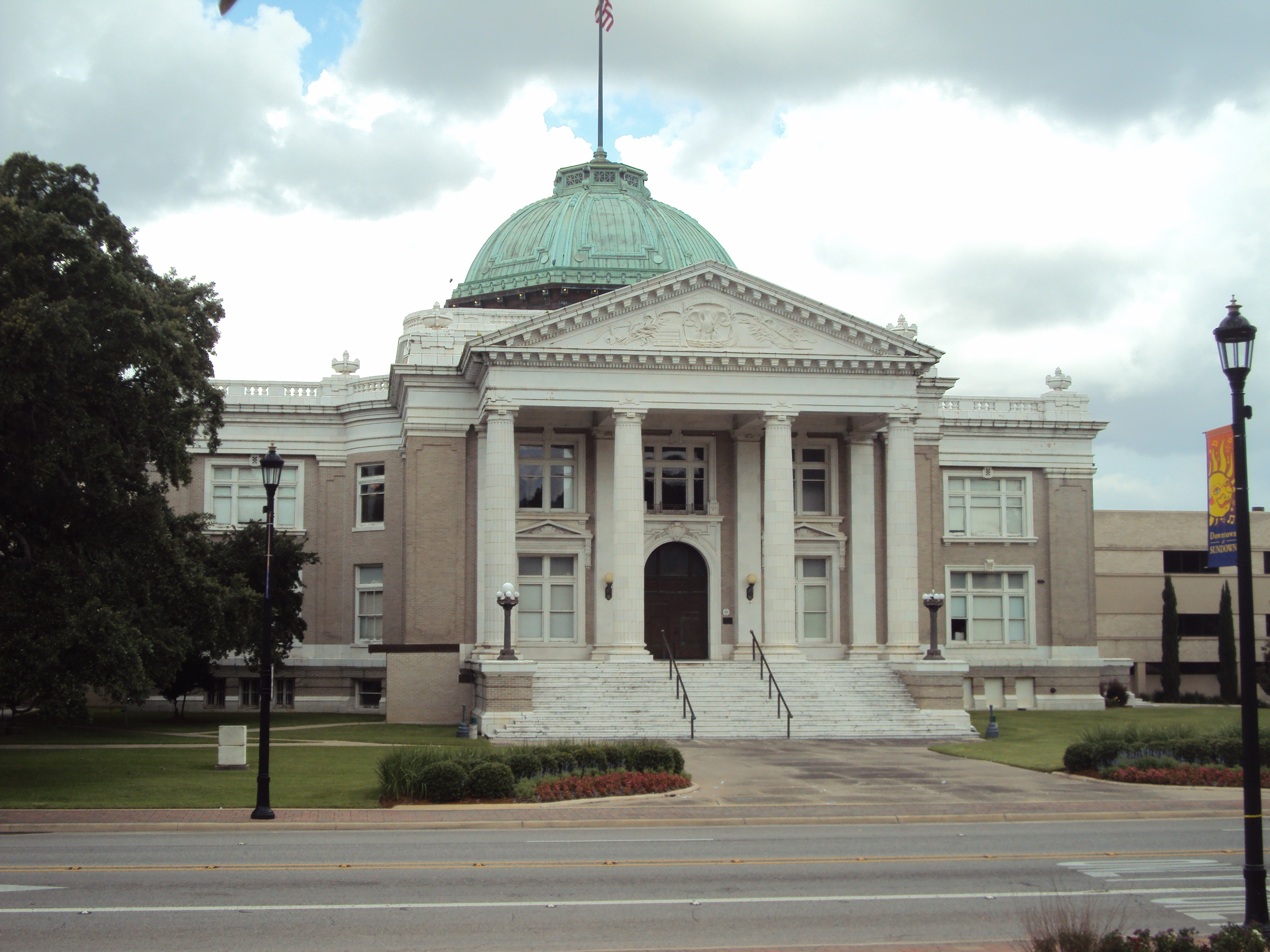
- Calcasieu Parish Courthouse in June 2016.

- Location within Louisiana Location within the United States
- Location: 1000 Ryan St, Lake Charles, Louisiana
- Coordinates: 30°13′35″N 093°13′06″W
- Area: 1 acre (0.40 ha)
- Built: 1912
- Architect: Favrot & Livaudais
- Architectural style: Classic Palladian style with columns, porticos, and a massive copper dome.
- NRHP reference No.: 89001938
- Added to NRHP: November 2, 1989

Calcasieu Parish Courthouse is located in Lake Charles, Louisiana. The previous courthouse burned down in the great fire of 1910. The courthouse was added to the National Register of Historic Places in Calcasieu Parish on November 2, 1989.

== Early history ==
Calcasieu Parish was created on March 24, 1840, from the parish of Saint Landry, and named after the Calcasieu River. Old maps use the Indian spelling Bayou Quelqueshue and Culcashue. The first parish seat was originally called Comasaque Bluff but was renamed to Marsh Bayou Bluff. On September 14, 1840, it was chosen as the parish seat. On December 8, 1840, the name was changed to Marion, Louisiana. There has been confusion with the like-named town of Marion in Union Parish, incorporated in 1852. The first parish seat was finally renamed Old Town, and is located southeast of Moss Bluff on English Bayou near the crossing of old Hwy 171. The first parish courthouse, a log cabin, was built in August 1841 in Marion. In 1852, Lake Charles was chosen as the parish seat, and the log courthouse was moved to the new location. By 1853, a wooden courthouse was built. In 1891, a new colonial brick building was built. In 1910, the courthouse was destroyed by the Great Fire. The new courthouse was finished in 1912. The dome on top of the courthouse is of solid copper.

=== History ===
The courthouse, offered by the architectural firm Favrot & Livaudais, was a copy of the Villa Capra "La Rotonda" outside Vicenza, Italy.
