= Oaks Hotel =

United States historic place

- U.S. National Register of Historic Places
- Location within Louisiana Location within the United States
- Location: SW Railroad Ave., Hammond, Louisiana
- Coordinates: 30°30′51″N 90°27′43″W
- Area: 1.7 acres (0.69 ha)
- Built: 1905
- Architect: Favrot & Livaudais
- NRHP reference No.: 79001090
- Added to NRHP: December 9, 1979

Oaks Hotel, also known as Casa de Fresa, is a former hotel in Hammond, Louisiana, built in 1905. It was an L-shaped building that was listed on the National Register of Historic Places in 1979. It was designed by Favrot & Livaudais, an architectural firm active in Louisiana from 1891 to 1933.

Its National Register nomination stated:

The building's striking feature is its attenuated pedimented entrance portico which surmounts the entrance vestibule in the corner where the wings meet. Added in the 1920s, it appears to be constructed of standard commercially available members.

The hotel was destroyed by fire in 1979.
