= Rapides Opera House =

- Formerly listed on the U.S. National Register of Historic Places
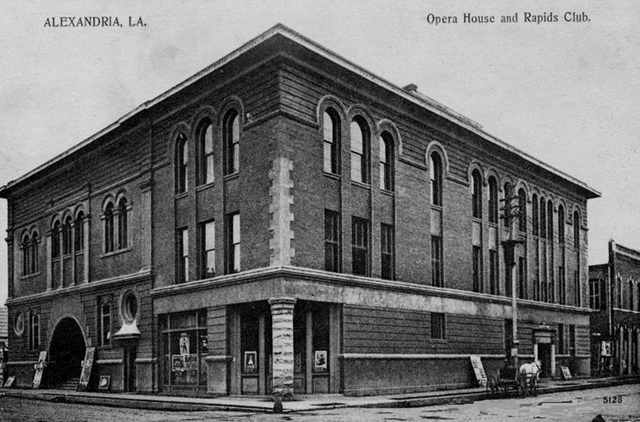

- Location within Louisiana Location within the United States
- Location: 1125 3rd St., Alexandria, Louisiana
- Coordinates: 31°18′38″N 92°26′36″W
- Area: 1 acre (0.40 ha)
- Built: 1903
- Architect: Favrot & Livaudais
- Architectural style: Romanesque
- NRHP reference No.: 81000298

Significant dates
- Added to NRHP: June 11, 1981
- Removed from NRHP: December 28, 2015

Rapides Opera House was located in Alexandria, Louisiana. It was a Romanesque building designed by Favrot & Livaudais and built in 1903. It was added to the National Register of Historic Places on June 11, 1981. It was demolished in 1985 and delisted on December 28, 2015.

== See also ==
- List of opera houses
- Theatre in Louisiana
