= Emmanuel Baptist Church (Alexandria, Louisiana) =

Historic church in Louisiana, United States

- U.S. National Register of Historic Places
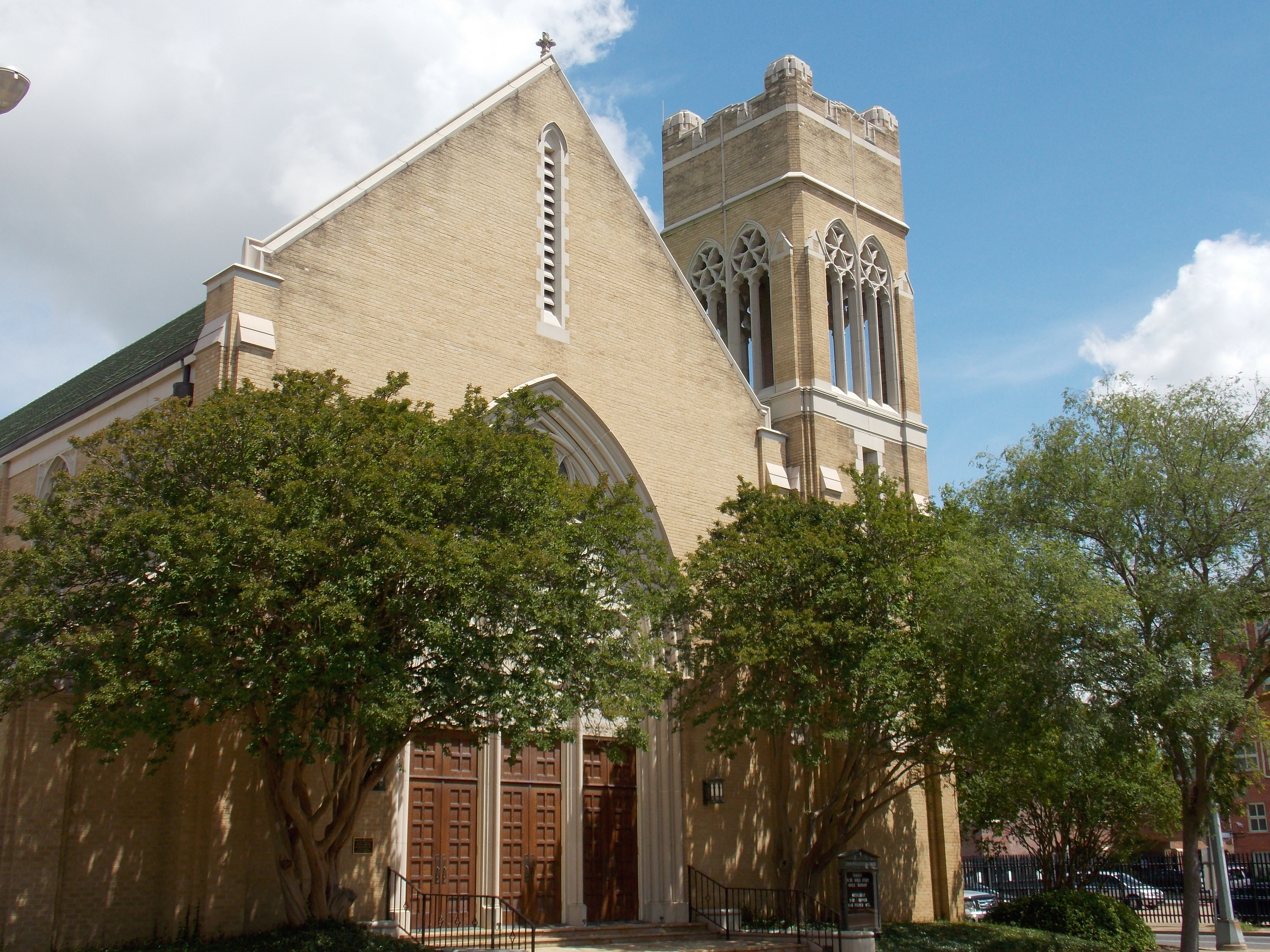
- Large Emmanuel Baptist Church on Jackson Street in downtown Alexandria

- Location within Louisiana Location within the United States
- Location: 430 Jackson St., Alexandria, Louisiana
- Coordinates: 31°18′42″N 92°26′50″W
- Area: less than one acre
- Built: 1950
- Architect: Favrot & Reed
- Architectural style: Gothic Revival
- NRHP reference No.: 01001255
- Added to NRHP: November 21, 2001

The Emmanuel Baptist Church in downtown Alexandria, Louisiana was built in 1950. It was added to the National Register of Historic Places on November 21, 2001.

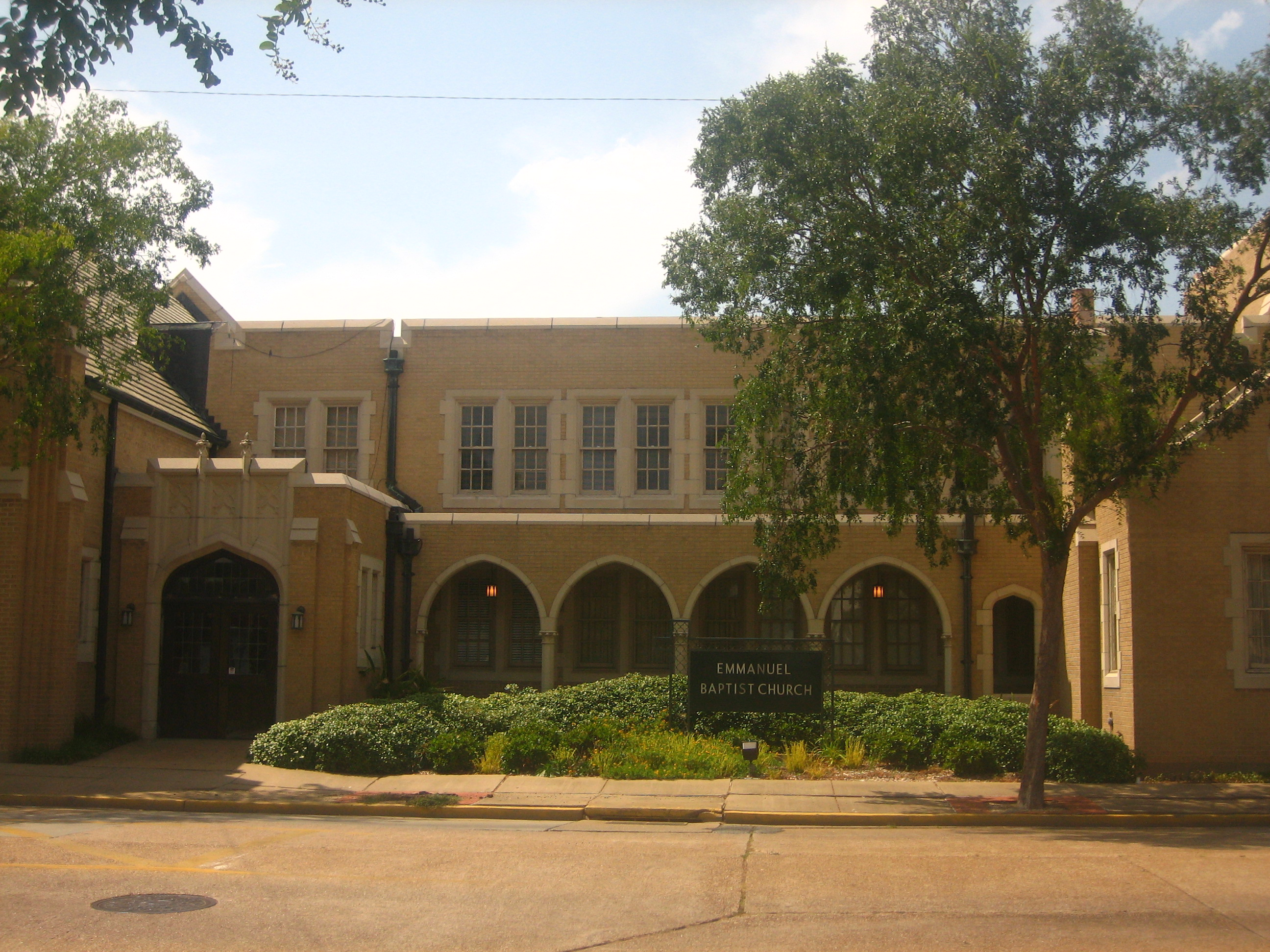

The building was designed by New Orleans architects Favrot & Reed. Jacoby Stained Glass Studios of St. Louis also contributed to the project.

In 1960 the building was expanded by an addition to the rear, and its education building was extensively remodeled.

A family life center was added to Emmanuel in the late 1970s under the leadership of then pastor Schuyler M. Batson (1923–1996).

In 2008 a roof replacement project took place, with new tiles produced by Ludowici, the original manufacturer.
