= Thomas A. Lemoine House (Hamburg, Louisiana) =

Historic house in Louisiana, United States

- U.S. National Register of Historic Places
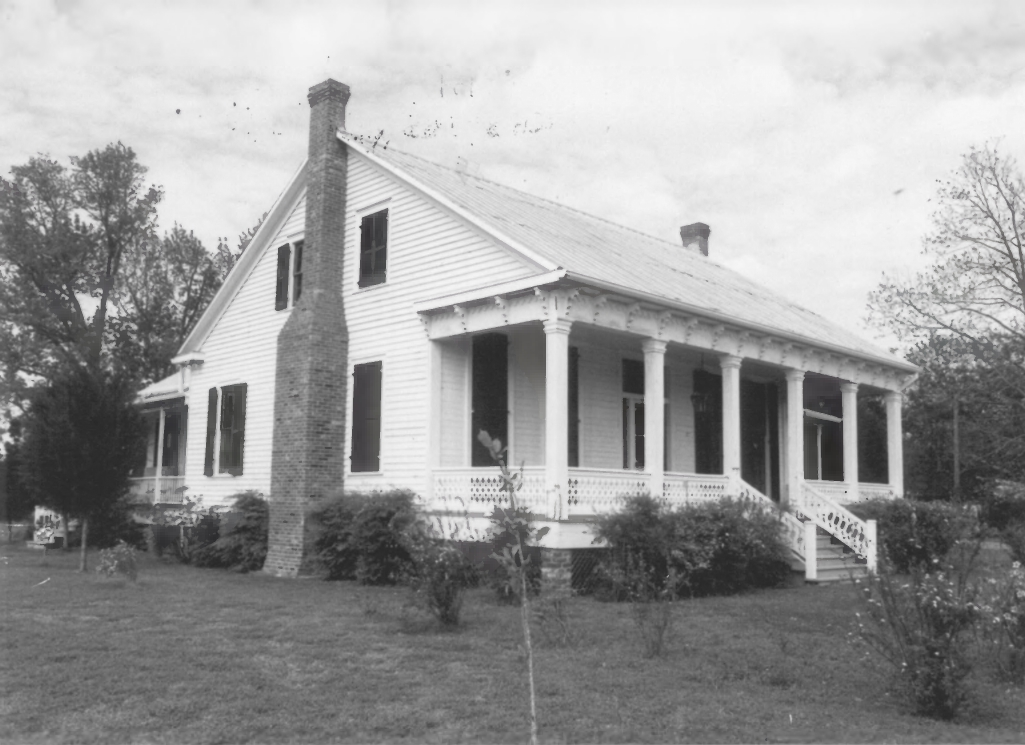

- Location within Louisiana
- Location: Along Louisiana Highway 451, Hamburg, Louisiana
- Coordinates: 31°01′55″N 91°55′58″W
- Area: 1.3 acres (0.53 ha)
- Built: c.1885
- Built by: Thomas A. Lemoine
- Architectural style: Italianate
- NRHP reference No.: 85001589
- Added to NRHP: July 18, 1985

The Thomas A. Lemoine House, also known as Mayfield, is a historic house on Louisiana Highway 451 in Hamburg, Louisiana.

It is a one-and-a-half-story wood frame Italianate cottage built in 1885 by Thomas A. Lemoine. It has a five-bay Italianate-style front gallery. The house was moved about 100 yards (91 m) in 1912 and then lost its hip roof and cupola, besides losing some elevation off the ground. It was moved again in 1978, by 2 miles (3.2 km) from Moreauville to Hamburg, when facing demolition.

One reason for its notability is its interior which includes a painted ceiling, which is a generally rare feature in Louisiana, although there were in fact three other houses with them in the parish surviving in 1985. The ceiling was said by tradition to have been painted by an Ursuline nun.

The house was listed on the National Register of Historic Places in 1985.

== See also ==
- Thomas A. Lemoine House (Moreauville, Louisiana), another house built in Moreauville by same builder. It was built in 1916 in Arts and Crafts style.
- National Register of Historic Places listings in Avoyelles Parish, Louisiana
