= Thomas A. Lemoine House (Moreauville, Louisiana) =

Historic house in Louisiana, United States

- U.S. National Register of Historic Places
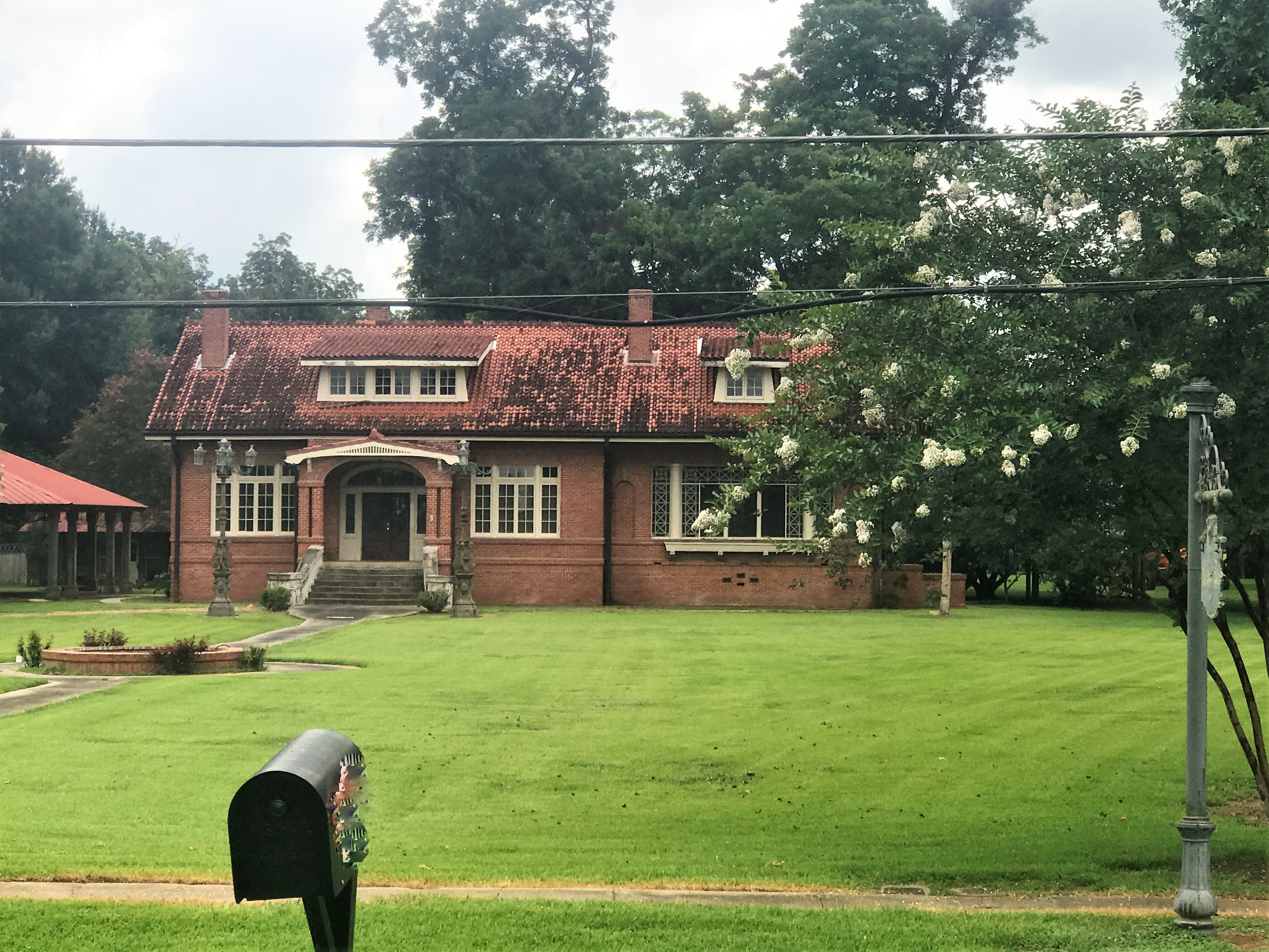

- Location within Louisiana
- Location: Along Louisiana Highway 451, Moreauville, Louisiana
- Coordinates: 31°02′23″N 91°58′37″W
- Area: 4.5 acres (1.8 ha)
- Built: 1916
- Built by: Thomas A. Lemoine
- Architect: Favrot & Livaudais
- Architectural style: Arts and Crafts
- NRHP reference No.: 85001588
- Added to NRHP: July 18, 1985

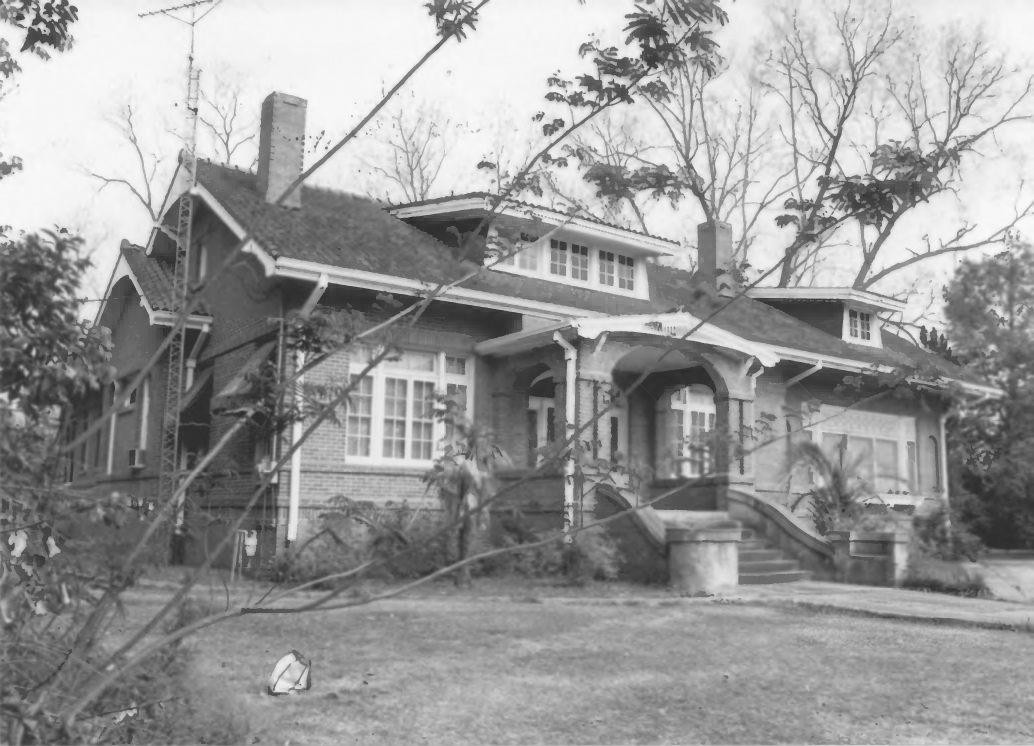
Thomas A. Lemoine House in Moreauville in 1985.

The Thomas A. Lemoine House in Moreauville, Louisiana is an Arts and Crafts-style house designed by New Orleans architects Favrot & Livaudais and built by builder Thomas A. Lemoine in 1916.

It is located on the outskirts of the small town of Moreauville. It was deemed significant as a rare work in urban high style by an important architectural firm in rural Avoyelles Parish. Only one other building in the parish was designed by the firm. It "has a distinctive Arts and Crafts design which sets it apart from virtually all other period residences in the parish and which bespeaks its high style origin."

As of 1985, the only modification to the house was enclosure of a screened loggia, which was felt did not detract from the historic character of the site.

The house, along with a contemporaneous cistern which is deemed to be a contributing structure, was listed on the National Register of Historic Places in 1985.

== See also ==
- Thomas A. Lemoine House (Hamburg, Louisiana), another house built in Moreauville by same builder. It was built in 1886 in Italianate style and was later moved to Hamburg.
- National Register of Historic Places listings in Avoyelles Parish, Louisiana
