= St. Paul Baptist Church-Morehead School =

Historic church in Louisiana, United States

- St. Paul Baptist Church--Morehead School
- U.S. National Register of Historic Places
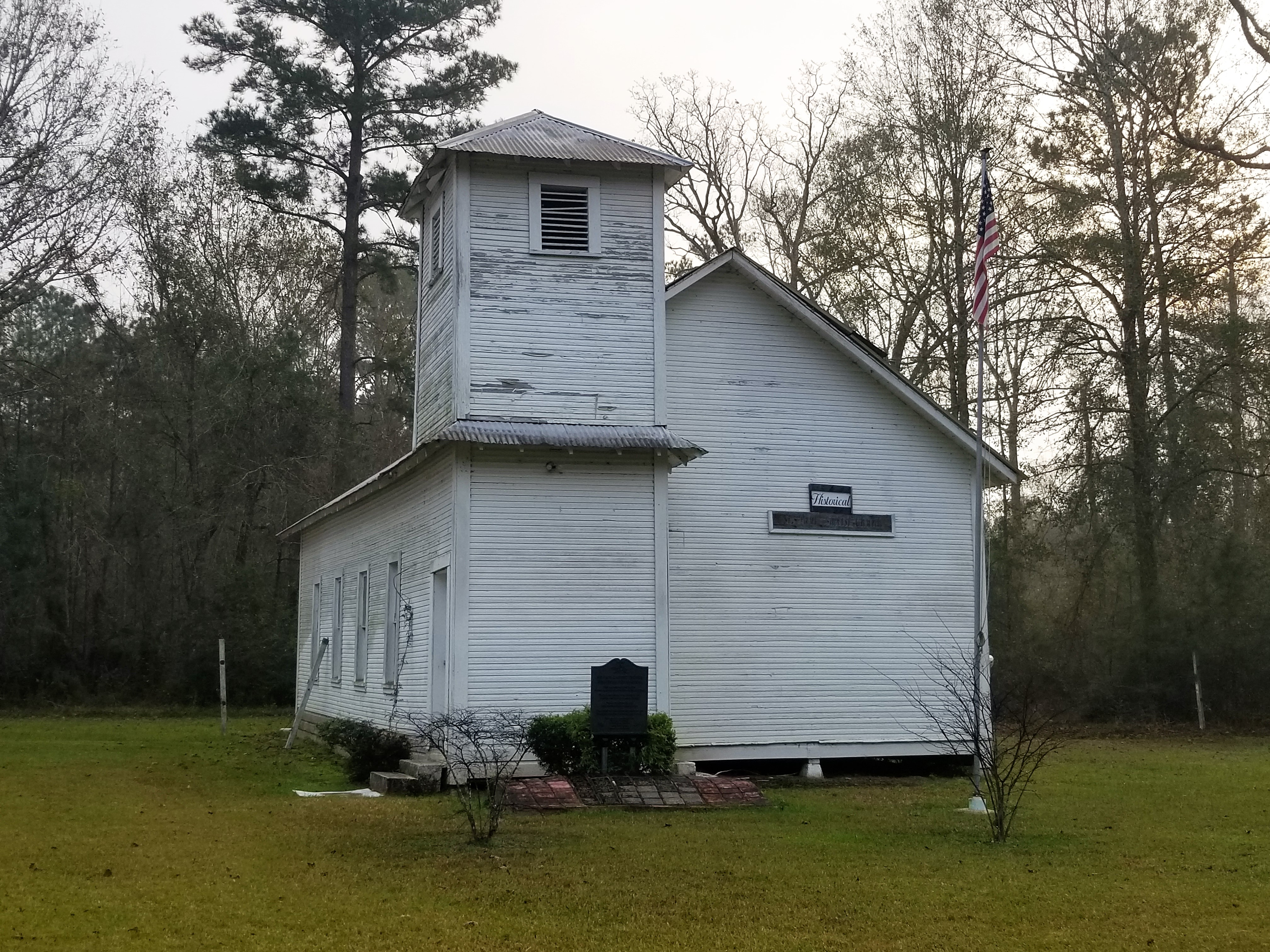

- Location within Louisiana Location within the United States
- Location: 772 Hickory Flats Road; Kinder, Louisiana
- Coordinates: 30°32′57″N 92°49′26″W
- Area: less than one acre
- Built: c. 1910
- NRHP reference No.: 05000686
- Added to NRHP: July 6, 2005

St. Paul Baptist Church—Morehead School near Kinder, Louisiana is a historic church which doubled as a public school for African-American students. The church was built c. 1910. It was used as a public school from 1919 to c. 1945.

It is a simple wood-frame church with a hipped roof and a forward-projecting tower. Inside, it has a vaulted ceiling and a historic blackboard on its front wall.

The church was added to the National Register of Historic Places in 2005.

== See also ==
- National Register of Historic Places listings in Allen Parish, Louisiana
