= Oakland, Union Parish, Louisiana =

Former community

- Former community
- Location within Louisiana Location within the United States
- Coordinates: 32.99573°N 92.35068°W
- Country: United States
- State: Louisiana
- Parish: Union
- Elevation: 92 ft (28 m)
- Time zone: UTC-6 (Central (CST))
  - Summer (DST): UTC-5 (CDT)

Oakland, Union Parish, Louisiana is a former community in northern Union Parish, Louisiana, United States. About one mile south of the Arkansas state line, it is 18 miles (29 km) north of Farmerville and 10 miles (16 km) northwest of Marion. It was also known as Union Cross Roads and Springhill or Spring Hill.

Its location is where Oakland Highway (Louisiana Highway 551) comes to its end at north-south Louisiana Highway 549. There are signs indicating "Oakland" on all three approaches, but there are no buildings remaining anywhere in sight; the area is mostly used for tree farming. Also converging into what was Oakland are Phillips Road (Union Parish Road 6686) and Spring Hill Road. The Springhill Baptist Church is about 1.5 miles (2.4 km) away, at intersection with Spring Hill Church Road. Harold & Lynda Phillips wrote in 2000: "Originally there were two Springhill Baptist Churches at this location, one for African Americans and one for White[s] and the cemeteries were together but separated by a cross fence. The African American Church can be seen from the cemetery, but the white church moved closer to Oakland in the late 1800 or early 1900 and is on Hwy 551." As of 2000, both churches were active.

Oakland rests at a relatively high elevation in Union Parish, at elevation of 256 feet (78 m), close to the parish's highest point of 285 feet (87 m) "in the uplands west of Oakland".

== History ==
There were no wagon roads into the area before 1839, when the Blacks (a family name) party of six white families bound for Arkansas arrived at Farmville and were stopped by dense forest. They set their numerous slaves to work creating one, which ran from Farmville through Oakland into Union County, Arkansas.

What became Oakland acquired a church in 1848 or 1849 when Rev. George Everett (1798-1855) arrived from Alabama and founded the Springhill Baptist Church. He sought to use the name "Springhill" for the community when he applied to the U.S. postmaster to open a post office, in 1852. However a different Spring Hill (south of Marion) had just been approved, and the "government assigned Everett's post office the name of Union Cross Roads". The name was officially changed to Oakland on April 5, 1874.

It was indeed listed as "Union Cross Roads" in Lippincott's Gazetteer or Geographical Dictionary's 1855 edition.

The Springhill or Spring Hill name apparently was still promoted and used (and is reflected in road names to this day). The 1860 census enumerator A.C. Wade, Ass't Marshall (mistakenly) filled in the Post Office field by handwritten "Spring Hill" on seven official census pages, each having 40 rows for name, age, sex, occupation, and birthplace. For example, see this first page, number 93. As can be seen from those pages typed up, the population was 279 (presumably in Oakland plus its area).

T.A. McFaden was postmaster in 1886; 64 persons signed petition to the US Post-Office Department supporting an increase of contract for W.J. Pickel to transport mail to & from Farmersville, Louisiana by way of Conway three times a week (up from some lower level of service), due to the weekly volume of 50 letters and 20 papers serving a population of 250 at Oakland and additional volume serving a farming population of 100 at Conway. This was approved by approved by A. Leo Knott, Second Assistant Postmaster-General.

A Masonic lodge, Spring Hill Lodge No. 27, was chartered in 1855 and was active in 1877, with location listed as Spring Hill Church P.O., Oakland, Union Parish". It was scheduled to meet monthly on the second Saturday. W.J. Pickels was the "Worshipful Master", T.M. Everett [presumably related to the deceased Rev. George Everett] was secretary, there were 19 members in total.

In 1906, Lippincott's Gazetteer named it as "Oakland, a post-village", and reported population of 75.

Early in the 1900s, during a statewide lumber boom, Oakhill was the location of two lumber mills of the Industrial Lumber Company. These were operational up to at least 1909 when the company built a new lumber mill and a company town at Elizabeth, Louisiana and moved its headquarters to there. Together the two mills had production capacity of 150,000 board-feet per day.

Given how the lumber industry worked in Louisiana in that era, the mills likely operated for only a few years, producing vast amounts of lumber, until all available forest in the area was clearcut. This occurred at Industrial Lumber Company's mill at Elizabeth, which processed 160,000 bf/day.

== Other ==
- Spring Hill Missionary Baptist Church, Oakland's papers from 1878 to 1966 are archived at Louisiana Tech University
- Oakland appears on Louisiana Department of Transportation and Development's "Union Parish East Section" map.
