= Elizabeth, Louisiana =

- Village
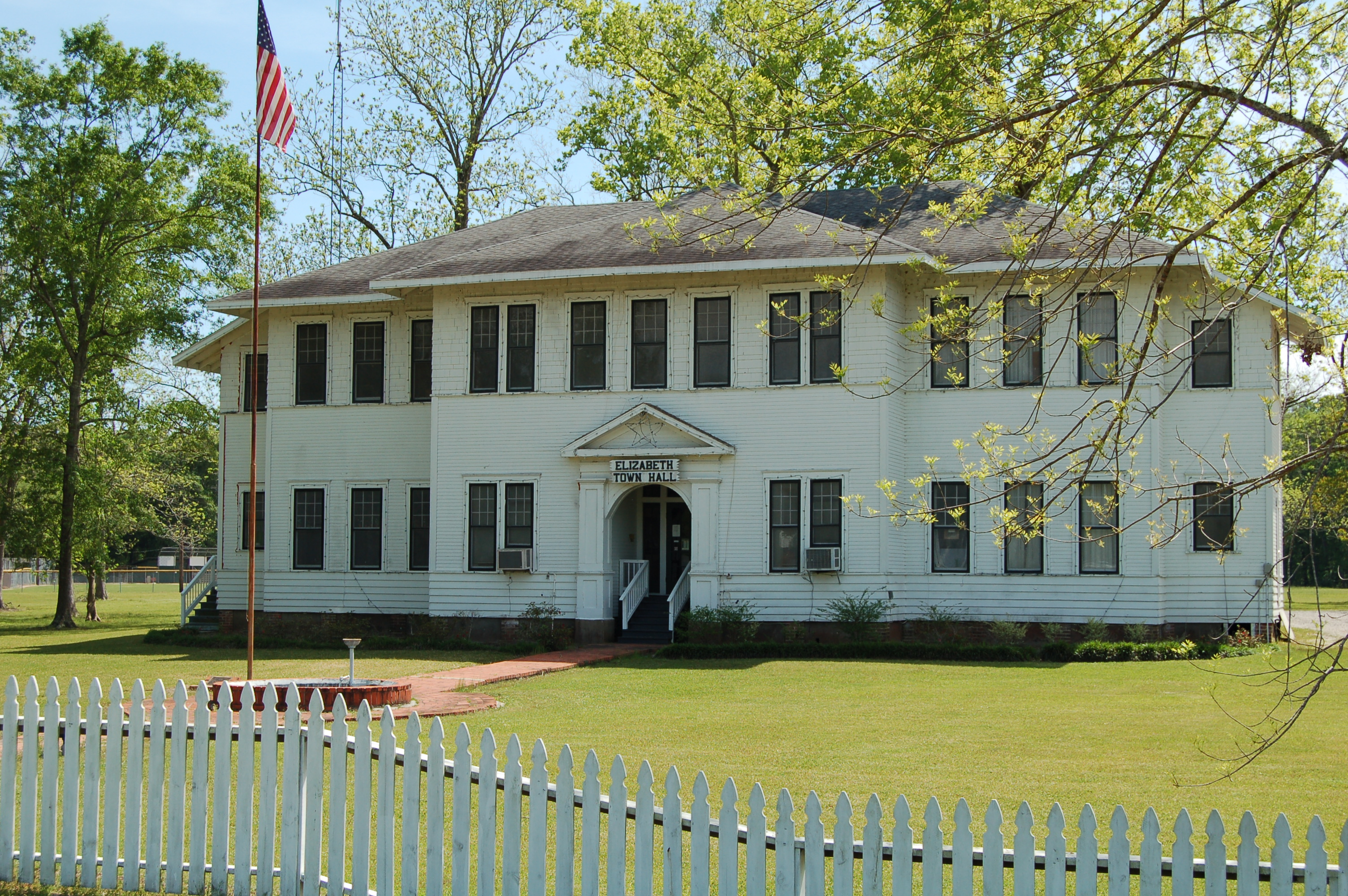
- Elizabeth Hospital Building, as Elizabeth Town Hall in 2005

- Location of Elizabeth in Allen Parish, Louisiana.

- Location of Louisiana in the United States
- Coordinates: 30°52′20″N 92°48′10″W
- Country: United States
- State: Louisiana
- Parish: Allen

Area
  - Total: 1.65 sq mi (4.28 km^{2})
  - Land: 1.65 sq mi (4.27 km^{2})
  - Water: 0.0077 sq mi (0.02 km^{2})
- Elevation: 144 ft (44 m)

Population (2020)
  - Total: 417
  - Density: 253.1/sq mi (97.72/km^{2})
- Time zone: UTC-6 (CST)
  - Summer (DST): UTC-5 (CDT)
- Area code: 318
- FIPS code: 22-23235
- GNIS feature ID: 2406433
- Website: https://villageofelizabeth.com

Elizabeth is a village in Allen Parish, Louisiana, United States with population of 417 in the 2020 census. It was a town and had population of 532 at the 2010 census.

== History ==
As the village's website notes, the Village of Elizabeth was once known as the "Town of Elizabeth". It became a town legally on January 23, 1964, when Gov. Jimmie H. Davis signed a proclamation making Elizabeth the fifth incorporated town in Allen Parish.

"The name Elizabeth was chosen as a tribute to the daughter of Sam Parks, one of the men who established the Industrial Lumber Company's Calcasieu Paper Mill. Elizabeth was carefully planned and held the component of a company town built to feed the lumber mill and made every effort to making them superior. The Town hospital for the mill, now holds Elizabeth's Village Hall."

== Geography ==
According to the United States Census Bureau in 2010, the town (not yet a village) has a total area of 1.7 square miles (4.3 km^{2}), of which 0.0077 square miles (0.02 km^{2}), or 0.37%, is water.

== Demographics ==
Historical population
Census	Pop.	Note	%±
1950	1,113		—
1960	1,030		−7.5%
1970	504		−51.1%
1980	454		−9.9%
1990	414		−8.8%
2000	574		38.6%
2010	532		−7.3%
2020	417		−21.6%
2025 (est.)	410	▼	−1.7%
U.S. Decennial Census; 1950 1960 1970 1980; 1990 2000 2010

Elizabeth first appeared as an unincorporated place in the 1950 U.S. census; and as a town in the 1970 U.S. census.

As of the 2020 census, Elizabeth was noted as a Village, and it had population of 417.

=== Racial and ethnic composition ===
Elizabeth village, Louisiana – Racial and ethnic composition Note: the US Census treats Hispanic/Latino as an ethnic category. This table excludes Latinos from the racial categories and assigns them to a separate category. Hispanics/Latinos may be of any race.
Race / Ethnicity (NH = Non-Hispanic)	Pop 2000	Pop 2010	Pop 2020	% 2000	% 2010	% 2020
White alone (NH)	511	513	381	89.02%	96.43%	91.37%
Black or African American alone (NH)	25	3	9	4.36%	0.56%	2.16%
Native American or Alaska Native alone (NH)	7	11	6	1.22%	2.07%	1.44%
Asian alone (NH)	0	0	2	0.00%	0.00%	0.48%
Native Hawaiian or Pacific Islander alone (NH)	0	0	0	0.00%	0.00%	0.00%
Other race alone (NH)	0	0	1	0.00%	0.00%	0.24%
Mixed race or Multiracial (NH)	15	1	16	2.61%	0.19%	3.84%
Hispanic or Latino (any race)	16	4	2	2.79%	0.75%	0.48%
Total	574	532	417	100.00%	100.00%	100.00%

=== 2000 census ===
As of the census of 2000, there were 574 people, 191 households, and 165 families residing in the town. The population density was 353.9 inhabitants per square mile (136.6/km^{2}). There were 205 housing units at an average density of 126.4 units per square mile (48.8 units/km^{2}). The racial makeup of the town was 90.07% White, 4.36% African American, 1.22% Native American, 1.22% from other races, and 3.14% from two or more races. Hispanic or Latino of any race were 2.79% of the population. Elizabeth's closest neighbor in Allen Parish is Oakdale, LA. Oakdale is located to the east of Elizabeth.

There were 191 households, out of which 47.1% had children under the age of 18 living with them, 61.8% were married couples living together, 22.0% had a female householder with no husband present, and 13.6% were non-families. 11.0% of all households were made up of individuals, and 5.8% had someone living alone who was 65 years of age or older. The average household size was 3.01 and the average family size was 3.17.

In the town, the population was spread out, with 32.2% under the age of 18, 9.8% from 18 to 24, 26.8% from 25 to 44, 19.2% from 45 to 64, and 12.0% who were 65 years of age or older. The median age was 30 years. For every 100 females, there were 82.2 males. For every 100 females age 18 and over, there were 86.1 males.

The median income for a household in the town was $28,750, and the median income for a family was $30,375. Males had a median income of $30,000 versus $21,250 for females. The per capita income for the town was $10,259. About 14.8% of families and 15.5% of the population were below the poverty line, including 20.3% of those under age 18 and 3.3% of those age 65 or over.

== Education ==
Allen Parish School Board is the school district for the whole parish.

Elizabeth High School, a PreK-12 school, is in the city.

== Notable people ==
- Cloves Campbell Sr., the first African American to serve in the Arizona Senate
- Faye Emerson, known in the early 1950s as the "First Lady of Television", was born in Elizabeth in 1917.
