= Maluti =

- Village
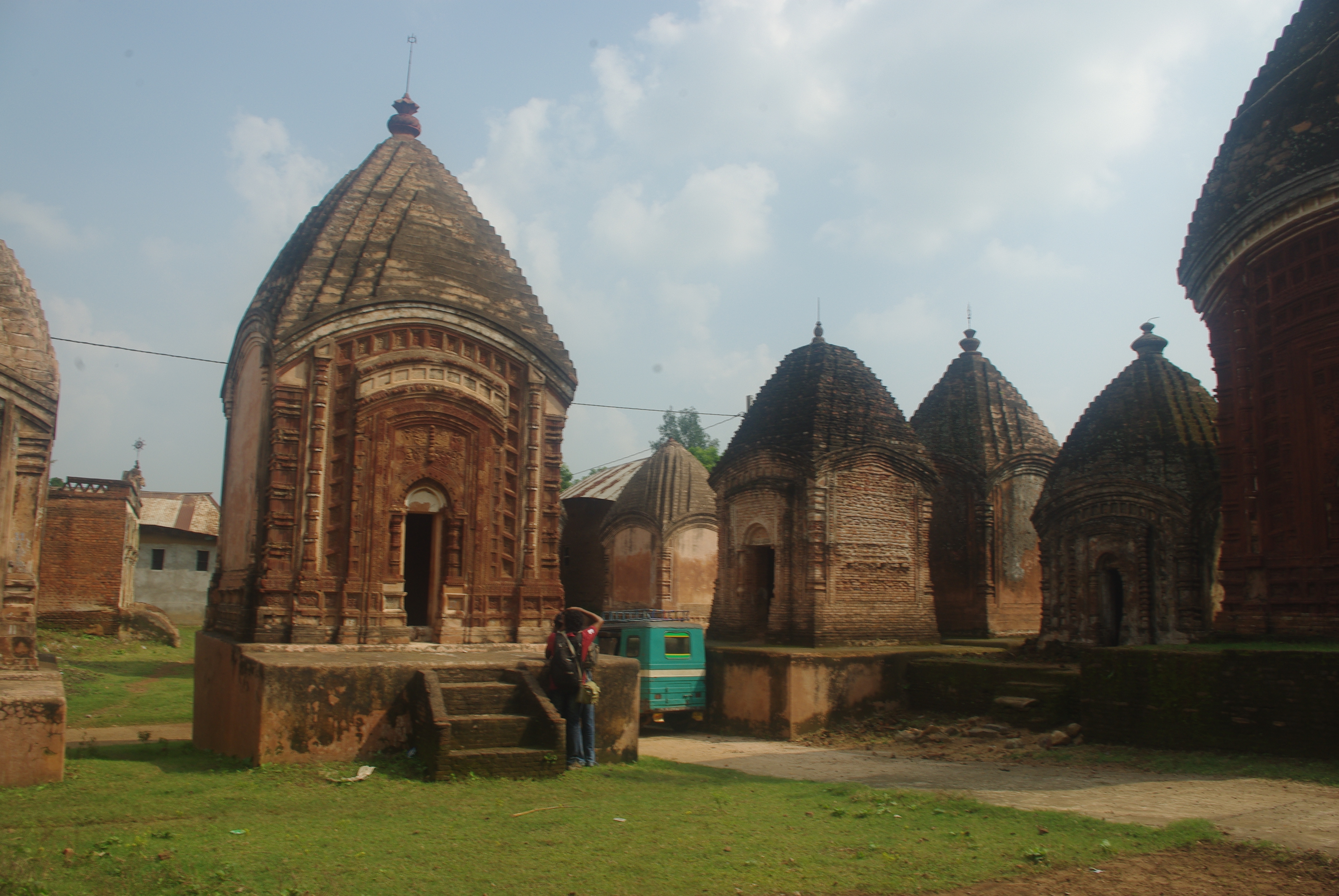
- Temples of Maluti
- Interactive map of Maluti
- Country: India
- State: Jharkhand
- District: Dumka district
- Time zone: UTC+5.30 (Indian Standard Time)

Maluti (also Malooti) is a village in Shikaripara CD block in the Dumka subdivision of the Dumka district of Jharkhand, India. It was built under the Baj Basanta dynasty. The area has 72 old temples, which are edifices to the kings of the Pala Dynasty. They portray various scenes from Hindu mythology including the Ramayana and the Mahabharata. Maluti is known for the annual sacrifice of over 100 goats on Kali Puja, besides one buffalo and a sheep. Animal activist groups have often strongly looked down at this activity. Today Maluti is endangered by insufficient management of the old temples, and threatened by natural disasters.

== Geography ==
Cities, towns and locations in the Deoghar, Dumka and Jamtara districts in Santhal Pargana Division
M: Municipality, CT: census town, R: Rural/ Urban centre, D: Dam,
Owing to space constraints in the small map, the actual locations in a larger map may vary slightly

=== Location ===
Maluti is located at 24°09′40″N 87°40′29″E

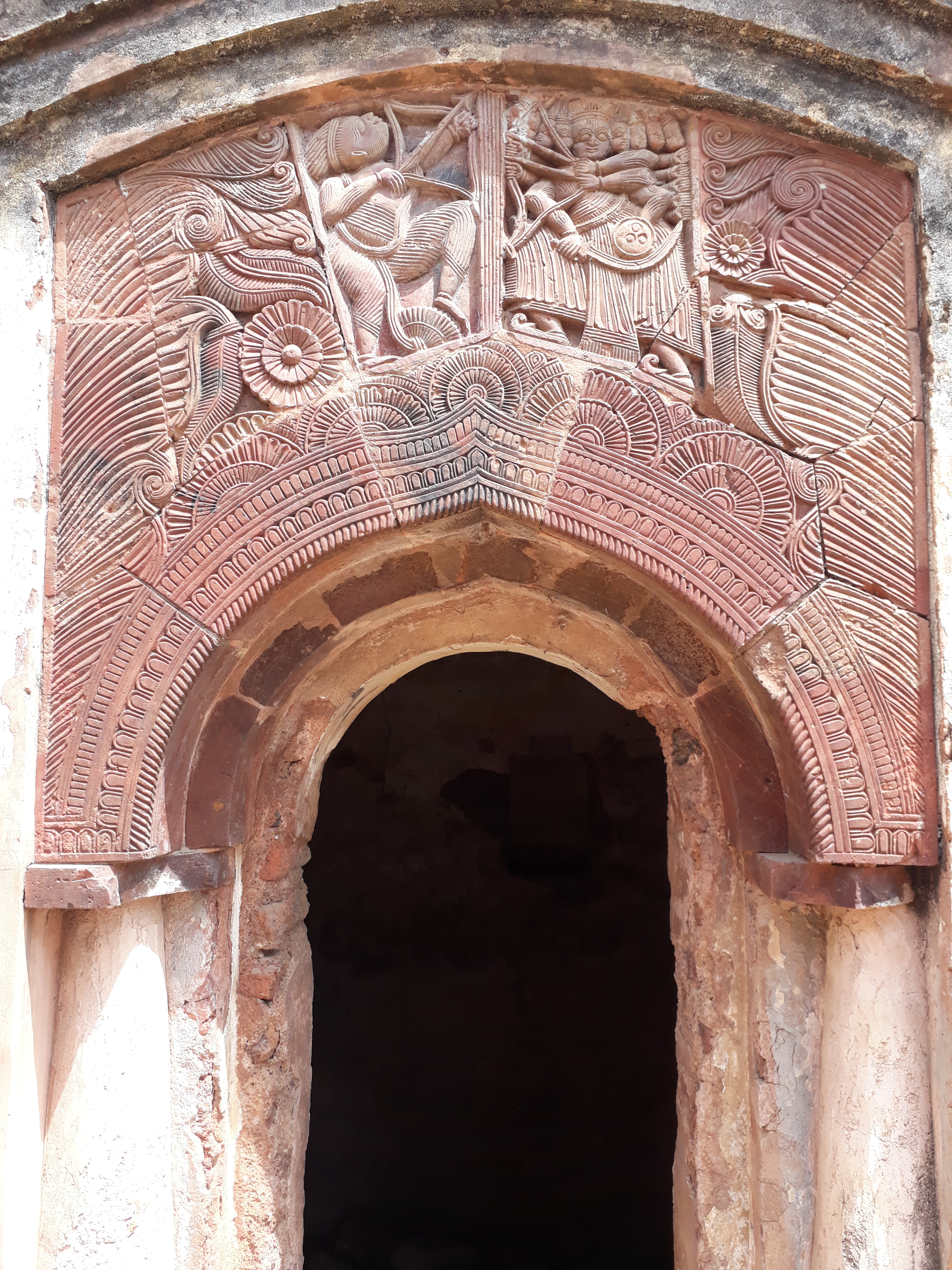
Maluti Temple terracotta works

Note: The full screen map is interesting. All places marked on the map are linked in the full screen map and one can easily move on to another page of his/her choice. Enlarge the full screen map to see what else is there – one gets railway connections, many more road connections and so on.

== Demographics ==
According to census of 2011; the total number of Houses in Maluti is 325, and the total population is 1469 (male=761, female=708). The total number of children aged 0–6 is 163 (male=93, female=70). 363 people (male=189, female=174) belong to Schedule Castes, and 52 (male=23, female=29) to Schedule Tribes.

Maluti village has higher literacy rate compared to Jharkhand overall. In 2011, literacy rate of Maluti village was 75.42% compared to 66.41% in Jharkhand. In Maluti Male literacy stands at 81.29%, while the female literacy rate was 69.28%.

== History ==
Maluti village came into limelight in fifteenth century as the capital of nankar raj (tax-free kingdom). The kingdom was awarded to one Basanta Roy of village Katigram by Sultan Alauddin Hussan Shah of Gauḍa (1495–1525). Son of a poor Brahmin Basanta managed to catch the pet hawk of the sultan and gave it back to the sultan. In lieu of the hawk (Baj), Basanta was given the kingdom. Hence, the king was called Raja Baj Basanta. The capital of Baj Basanta dynasty was in Damra. Later it was shifted to Maluti. The royal family was very pious.

Basanta became a king in lieu of a baj (hawk) by the help of a Dandi Sanyasi of Sumeru Math, Kashi may be true to a great extent because the word Baj has been pre-fixed with the name of Basanta to commemorate the event. The name Baj Basanta is comparatively prominent because it can be found both in local history and government records. Swamiji, the head of Sumeru Math, Varanasi, was the preceptor of Basanta. Since then the head of Sumeru Math who is called Rajguru becomes the preceptor of descendants of king Baj Banata. Even today Rajguru from Sumeru Math Varanasi spends sometime at Maluti every year.

How Maluti — the capital of Baj Basanta dynasty — turn out to be a 'temple city' is also an interesting story. Instead of constructing palaces, the Rajas built temples. The dynasty was broken into parts (tarafs) but each taraf kept building temples, competing with the others. In the end, it turned out be a unique temple village. Inscriptions in Proto-Bengali on the temples show they were named after women.

In another opinion the name of the village Maluti probably comes from Mallahati of Malla Kings of Bankura, Vishnupur had suzerainty over this area. That point of time this area ruled by Malla kings of Bankura was Damin-i-koh (present pakur in north. Burdwan in the east, Midnapore in south and some portion of Chota Nagpur Plateau in west) This vast land was called Mallabhum. The village might have been named in those days by prefixing 'Malla' in relevance with royal dynasty.

Around 1857, Swami Bamdev (or Sadhak Bamakhyapa), one of Bengal's greatest spiritual leaders, came here to be a priest but failed because he couldn't memorise Sanskrit mantras. He was made to cook food for the puja. During his 18-month stay in Maluti, Bamakhyapa used to spend most of his time at Mauliskshya temple. Here he was first blessed. Then, he moved to Tarapith. His trident is still preserved at Maluti.

But Maluti, may not be in this name, existed long before being the kingdom of the tax-exempted capital of Baj Basanta dynasty. It was once revered as a great seat of learning. Mention of Maluti — known as Gupta Kashi in ancient times — is found as early as the Shunga dynasty (185 BC - 75 BC), whose founder was Pushyamitra Shunga (185 BC - 151 BC). It was at Maluti that the king of Pataliputra performed Ashvamedh Yajna. Later Vajrayani Buddhists, followers of Tantrik rituals, settled here. So, Mauliksha Maa is the most ancient idol ever found in Maluti.

It is said that Adi Shankaracharya, on his way to Varanasi, had stopped over at Maluti. And it is here that he launched his mission against Buddhism. Some historians say Maluti is the first place where the Vedic upheaval started. Dandiswami of Varanasi's Sumeru Math still comes here once a year as part of the ritual that began with Adi Shankaracharya.

== The Pre-History ==
Some pre-historic stone tools found in the river bed of Chila confirm that Maluti used to be inhabited by our pre-historic fore-fathers, though the area was never excavated.

The river Chila is flowing at the edge of the village and marks the boundary of Jharkhand and West Bengal. The river originated from Banspahari, a highland in the Dumka district and meet with Dwarka River in Bengal. Stone tools and primitive weapons are found on the river bed at different place.

The stone-tools found in the area are hand-axes, scrappers and blades. Plenty of waste materials are also found scattered everywhere on the river bed. These tools belonged to transit period from Early Stone Age to the Middle Stone Age. The working edge is scattered and is still sharp. Neolithic or Chaleolithic specimens are not found in the village or its vicinity as yet. According to archeologist Prof. Subrata Chakravorty of Visva-Bharati University, the tools belonged to Paleolithic period.

Prof. Subrata Chakravorty divided the tools into two broader categories Acheulian and Middle Paleolithic. Some Mesolithic artefacts also are available in the site. Prof. Chakravorty detailed the Acheulian finds discovered from Chila, classification of such tools collected from the site and raw materials used to make those tools.

Acheulian found at Maluti Sadarghaton Chila, the river that flows in Birbhum – Jharkhand border land. Acheulian finds discovered from three localities one of them fossiliferous include hand axes, cleavers, choppers, scrappers and unqualified wastes, flakes, cores and chips are made of raw materials — traps, basalts, quartzites, charts, jasper. The assemblage of Maluti Sadarghat Acheulian sites show preponderance of various other tools such as retouched flakes, side scrappers, end scrappers, point borers and sundry light duty tools.

The tools bearing area extends from a point called Sadarghat to an up-stream point named Shirali. The distance between the two points is only a kilometer. The archeological remains of late medieval period inside the village Maluti and availability of pre-historic stone tools from the outskirt have made this village a treasure trove of archeology.

== Temples of Maluti ==
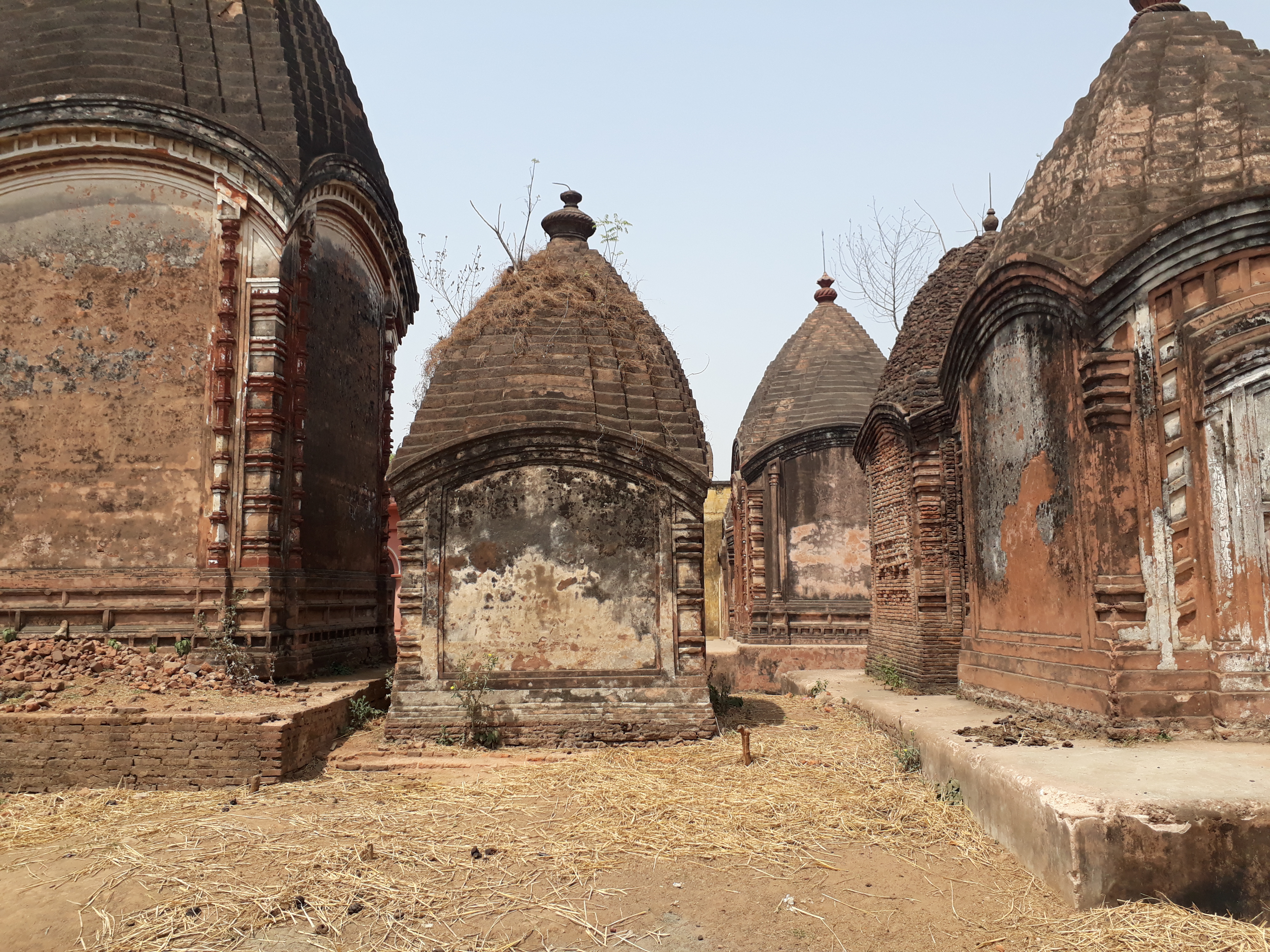
Temples in Maluti, Jharkhand

Today, an important priority of the village Maluti is maintaining its 72 ancient temples. It is alleged that the king of Nankar state originally constructed 108 temples, but later generations could not maintain such a huge number of monuments, and most were left uncared for. With the passing of time, as many as 36 monuments deteriorated and finally crumbled completely.

In a 2010 report titled Saving Our Vanishing Heritage, Global Heritage Fund identified Maluti's Temples as one of 12 worldwide sites nearest ("On the Verge") of irreparable loss and damage, citing insufficient management as primary cause.

With regards to the temples' architecture, it is noticed that in the existing temples no particular style, like Nagara, Vesar or Dravida, have been followed. The specialist artisans who were obviously from Bengal had given shape to numerous designs while constructing these temples. Their designs have been assigned to five categories.

The main temple of Maluti site is Ma Mauliksha Temple, which is the main deity of royal family of Baj Basanta Ray and Guardian Goddess of Maluti. Interestingly this goddess is not found in Hindu scripture but is found in Vajrayana Buddhism as the Goddess Pāndora. Gradually the Buddhist influence of this region tempers down and become a Goddess of Hindu tantra.
