= Hisham's Palace =

Early Islamic archaeological site near Jericho, West Bank, Palestine

- قصر هشام (Arabic)
- Khirbet al-Mafjar
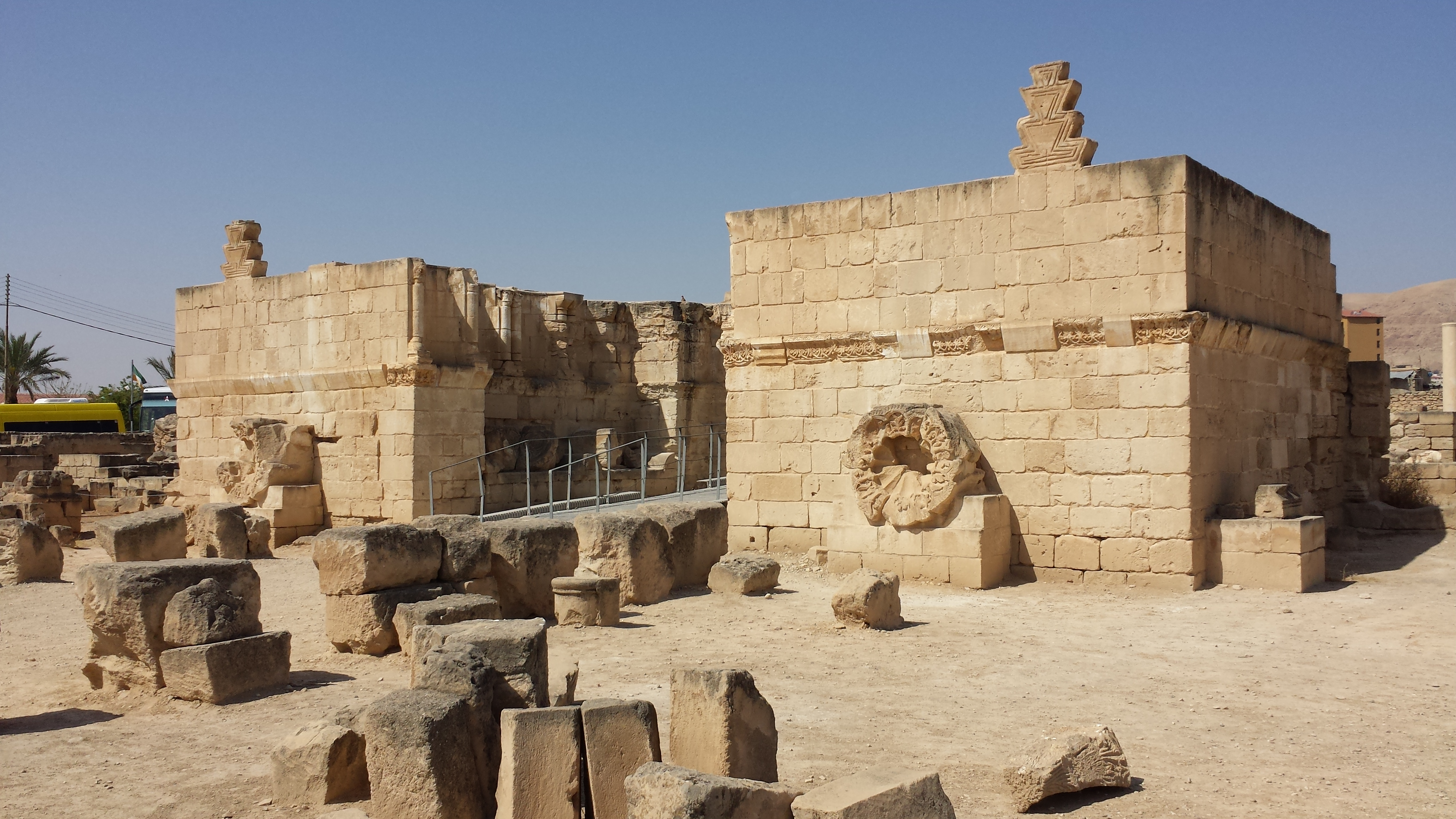
- The entrance to the palace in 2017

- Location within State of Palestine
- 31°52′57″N 35°27′35″E
- Type: Umayyad qasr
- Periods: Early Islamic period
- Cultures: Umayyad
- Location: Jericho Governorate, West Bank, Palestine

History
- Built: 724–743

Site notes
- Excavation dates: 1935–1948; 1957–1960s; 2006–
- Archaeologists: Dimitri Baramki; Awni Dajani; Hamdan Taha and Donald Whitcomb
- Public access: Yes

Hisham's Palace (Arabic: قصر هشام Qaṣr Hishām), also known as Khirbat al-Mafjar (Arabic: خربة المفجر), is an important early Islamic archaeological site in the city of Jericho, in the West Bank in Palestine. Built by the Umayyad dynasty in the first half of the 8th century, it is one of the so-called Umayyad desert castles. It is located 3 kilometres (2 mi) north of Jericho's city center, in an area governed by the Palestinian National Authority (PNA). The palace was used until the 11th century, and it may have been destroyed by an earthquake in 1033.

Spreading over 60 hectares (150 acres), the site consists of three main parts: a palace, an ornate bath complex, and an agricultural estate. The entire complex – palace, baths, and farm – was connected to nearby springs by an elaborate water system. The site is on the tentative list of World Heritage Sites and has been open to the public since 2021. The palace has one of the largest continuous mosaic floors in the world covering nearly 850 square metres (9,100 sq ft).

== Location ==
Hisham's Palace was established north of Jericho's urban centre. It was separated from Jericho by the Wadi Nueima. The archaeologist Michael Jennings suggests that the separation provided protection as Jericho was at the time a mostly Christian settlement. Its position meant accessing the main water source in the area, the Ayn al-Sultan spring, was impractical. Instead, the palace drew its water from springs at Naaran to the north-west. Aqueducts were built to transport water from the springs to the palace. The palace was immediately east of a road running north from Jericho, through the Jordan Valley, and connecting to Damascus.

== History ==
It is difficult to establish a secure historical framework for Hisham's Palace. No textual sources reference the site, and archaeological excavations are the only source of further information. An ostracon bearing the name "Hisham" was found during the course of Baramki's excavations. This was interpreted as evidence that the site was built during the reign of the caliph Hishām ibn ʿAbd al-Malik. Robert Hamilton subsequently argued that the palace was a residence of al-Walid ibn Yazid, a nephew of Hisham who was famous for his extravagant lifestyle. Archaeologically it is certain that the site is a product of the Umayyad dynasty in the first half of the 8th century, although the specifics of its patronage and use remain unknown.

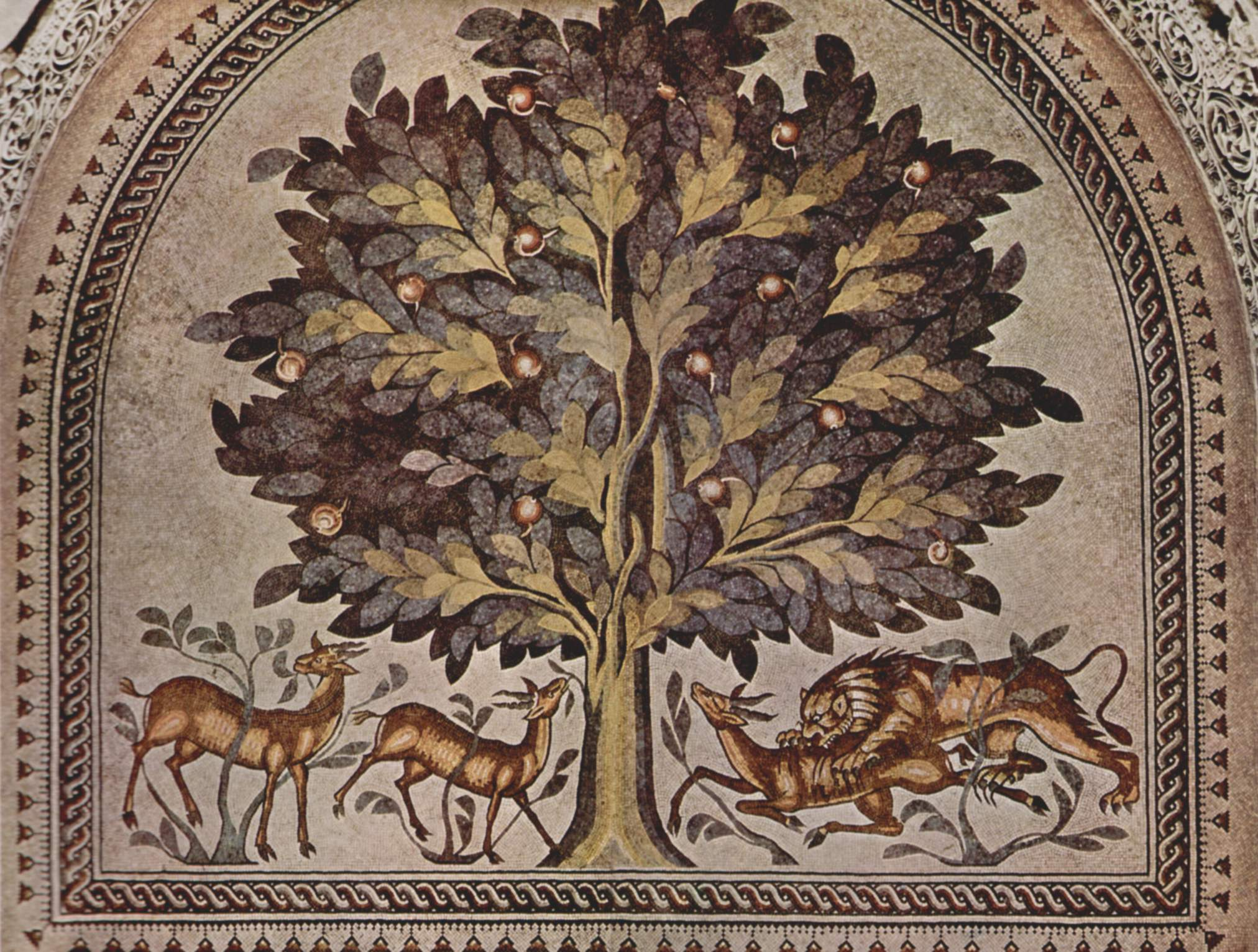
Archaeologists Hamdan Taha and Donald Whitcomb described the "Tree of Life" mosaic in the bath house as "the most famous of Umayyad mosaics".

Hisham's Palace belongs to the category of desert castles, a collection of monuments dating to the Umayyad dynasty and found throughout Syria, Jordan, Israel, and Palestine. Although there is great variation in the size, location, and presumed function of these different sites, they can be connected to the patronage of different figures in the Umayyad ruling family. Though it has been described as one of the Umayyad desert castles, Hisham's Palace is located in a fertile area. Consequently, it has become more common to refer to it as a qasr (plural: qusur), an Arabic word roughly translating to "palace". As a category of building, the Umayyad qusur had several typical characteristics. The main structure was usually two-storeys tall and consisted of ranges of buildings arranged around a courtyard. Other buildings were often found nearby, creating a complex of related structures. This could include a bath building, a mosque, outlying residential buildings, and a large walled enclosure called a hayr that extended east beyond the buildings.

The site is commonly thought to have been destroyed during the earthquake of 749 and then abandoned, but an analysis of Baramki's detailed reporting shows that this is incorrect. Instead the ceramic record indicates that the occupation continued through the Ayyubid-Mamluk period, with a significant phase of occupation between 900 and 1000 during the Abbasid and Fatimid periods. A 2013 geological investigation of the site suggest the palace was destroyed by the later earthquake of 1033. Evidence of faulting and damage corresponded to a more severe earthquake than that of 749.

== Excavation history ==
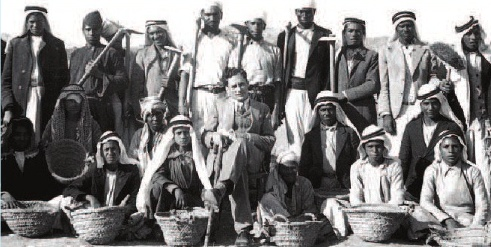
Baramki (centre, seated) with excavators at Hisham's Palace in 1937

The site was discovered in 1873. The northern area of the site was noted, but not excavated, in 1894 by F. J. Bliss. Palestinian archaeologist Dimitri Baramki carried out major excavations at the palace between 1935 and 1948. In 1959 Baramki's colleague, colonial administrator for the British Mandate government Robert Hamilton, published the major work on Hisham's Palace, Khirbat al-Mafjar: An Arabian Mansion in the Jordanian Valley. Unfortunately, Baramki's archaeological research is absent from this volume, so Hamilton's analysis is exclusively art historical. Baramki's research on the archaeological aspects of the site, particularly the ceramics, was published in various preliminary reports and articles in the Quarterly of the Department of Antiquities in Palestine. When Hisham's Palace was discovered there were few similar sites known which could aid interpretation. Since then nearly 40 Umayyad qusur have been identified. Many of the finds from Baramki and Hamilton's excavations are now held in the Rockefeller Archeological Museum in East Jerusalem.

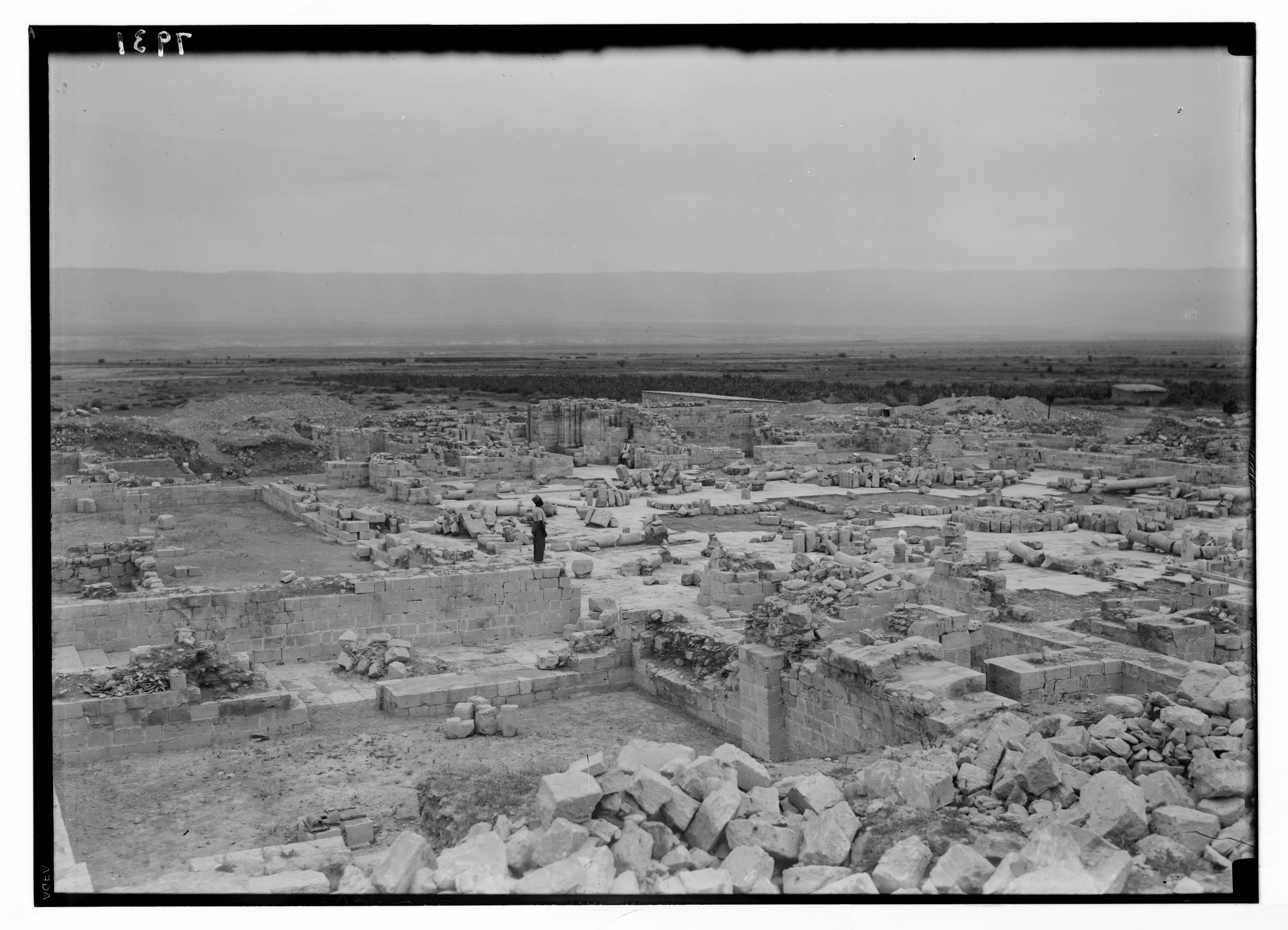
The palace under excavation in the 1930s

Following the 1948 Arab–Israeli War, the Kingdom of Jordan annexed the West Bank. This meant that archaeological sites in the area came under the administration of the Department of Antiquities of Jordan. Baramki was offered the position of director with authority over sites in the West Bank, but he decided to work at the Palestine Archaeological Museum instead. Awni Dajani was appointed to the role; Dajani's family owned the land where Hisham's Palace had been discovered and he began new excavations there in 1957 and continued into the 1960s. Dajani dug to the north of the bathhouse; the results were only partially published and the first plan of the excavated area was created decades after Dajani's investigations.

Across 1994 and 1995, control of archaeological sites in Areas A and B of the West Bank was transferred to the Department of Antiquities of the newly formed Palestinian National Authority. The department initiated international partnerships to address a skills gap resulting from Palestinians being excluded from archaeological investigations in Palestine under occupation. One such project was the conservation of Hisham's Palace. The work led by the department began at the palace in 1996 with funding from the Italian government and the involvement of UNESCO and the Studium Biblicum Franciscanum.

In 2006, new excavations were initiated under Hamdan Taha of the Palestinian Ministry of Tourism and Antiquities. The Jericho Mafjar Project investigating the site was a collaboration between the ministry and archaeologists from the University of Chicago.

Between 2009 and 2014 Mahmoud Hawari led investigations of the landscape around the palace to better understand how Hisham's Palace was connected to its hinterland. In 2015, an agreement was signed between the Palestinian Ministry of Tourism and Antiquities and the Japan International Cooperation Agency to enable the 825 square metres (8,880 sq ft) mosaic in the palace, one of the largest in the world, to be uncovered and readied for display.

== Architecture ==
Plan of the site

The palace, bath complex, and external mosque are enclosed by a retaining wall. The southern gate was known from Baramki's excavations, but the 21st-century discovery of a northern gate in alignment indicates that the development of Hisham's Palace was conceived of as a complete unit to be constructed at once.

=== Palace ===
The largest building at the site is the palace, a roughly square building with round towers at the corners. It originally had two stories. Entrance was through a gate on the center of the east side. The inner rooms were aligned around a central paved portico (riwaq), which featured an underground cellar (sirdab); for refuge from the heat. The room to the south of the portico was a mosque with a mihrab built into the outer wall.

=== Outer pavilion and mosque ===
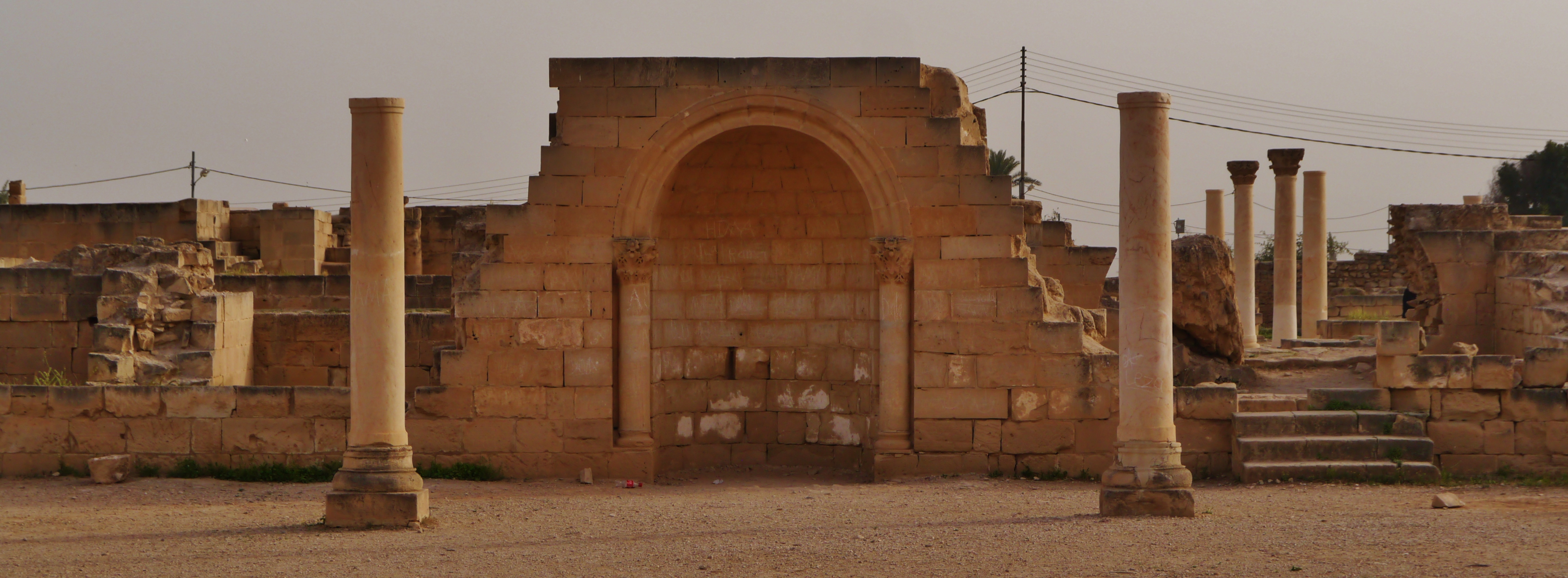
The reconstructed mihrab and columns of the mosque north of the palace gateway

In the courtyard east of the palace-and-baths complex was a pavilion containing a monumental fountain. A second, larger mosque was located inside the complex, north of the palace gateway.

=== Bath complex ===
A reconstruction model of the palace

The bath complex is located just north of the palace across an open area. This free-standing structure is almost 30 meters square, more precisely 827 square metres (8,900 sq ft), and three of its sides feature semi-circular exedrae which project out from the building, three each to the south and west, and two to the east. The east face of the bath had an ornate entrance in its center, flanked by exedrae. Along much of the southern side of the main, square hall is a pool. The interior floor surface of the bath complex was paved with mosaic decoration. A special reception room, or diwan, was entered from the northwest corner. The floor of this room is paved with the famous "tree of life" mosaic, depicting a lion and gazelles at the foot of a tree.

The actual bathing rooms were attached to the northern wall of the complex, and were heated from below the floor by hypocausts.

=== Agricultural annex ===
To the north of the bath complex are the ruins of a large square structure which has clearly gone through many phases of reuse and reconstruction. This part of the site was initially assumed to be a khan or caravanserai, but recent excavations have indicated that the northern area had an agricultural function connected to the hayr or agricultural enclosure during the Umayyad and Abbasid periods.

=== Photo gallery ===
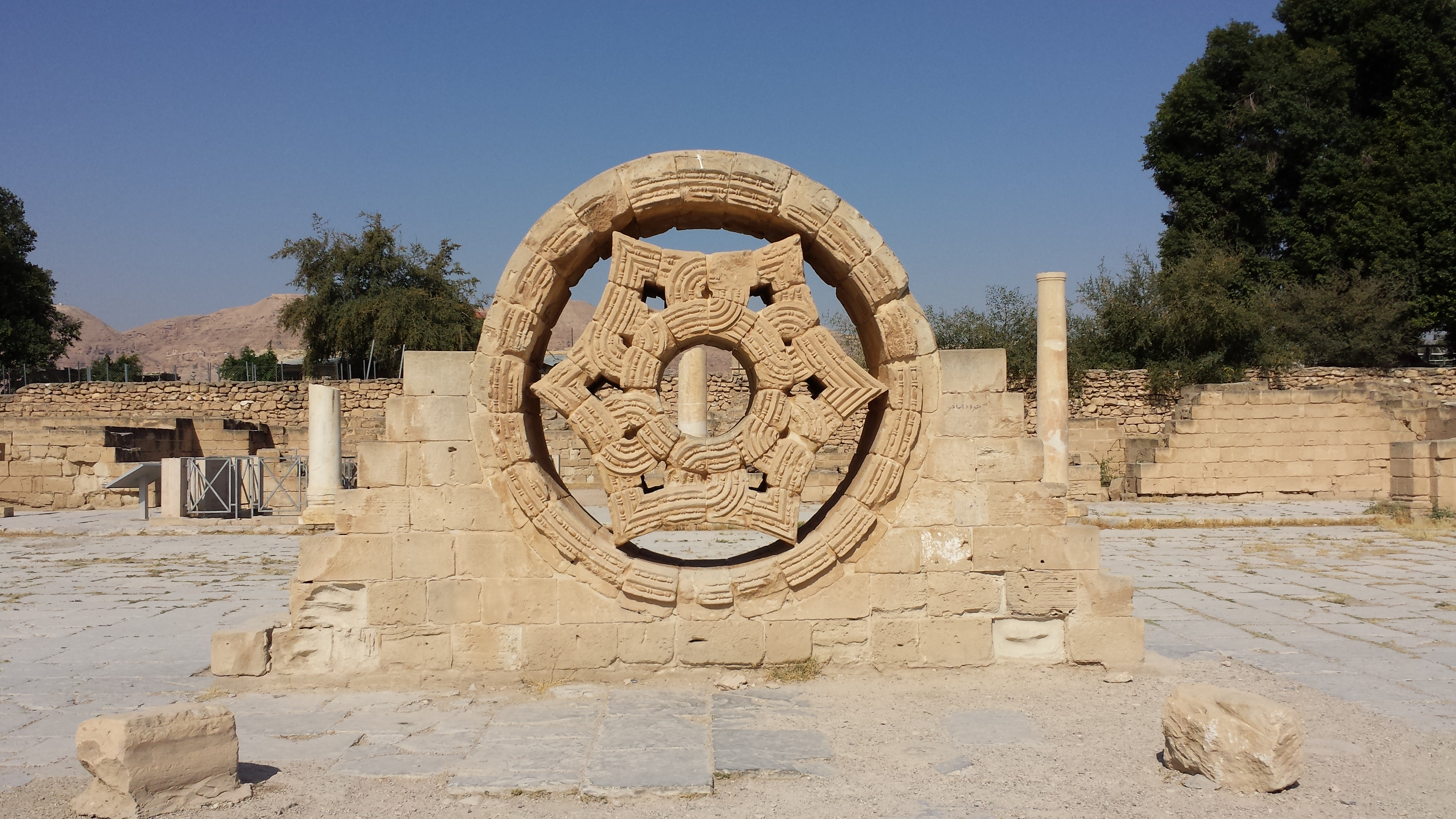
Decorated stone window

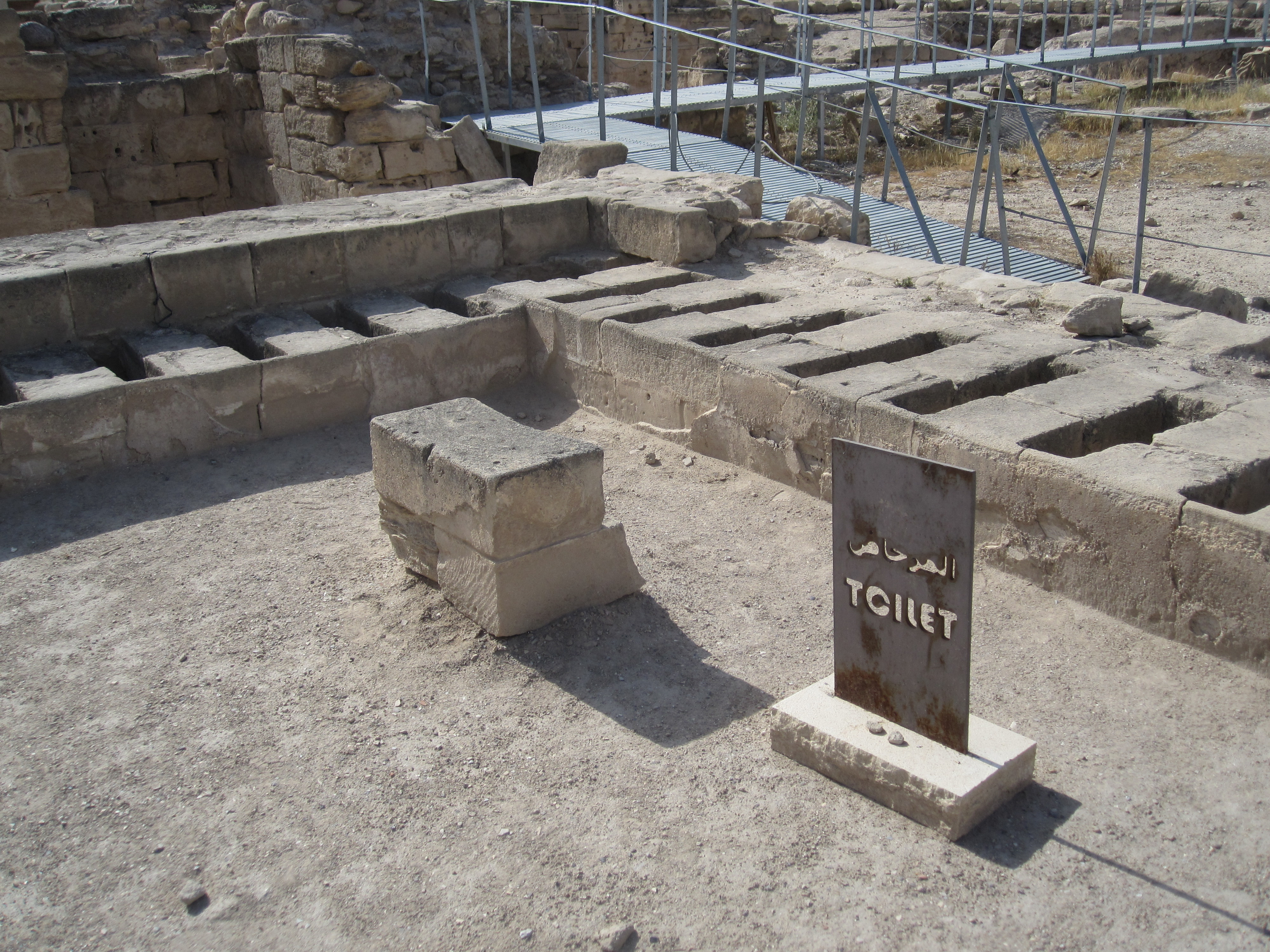
Bath house latrine

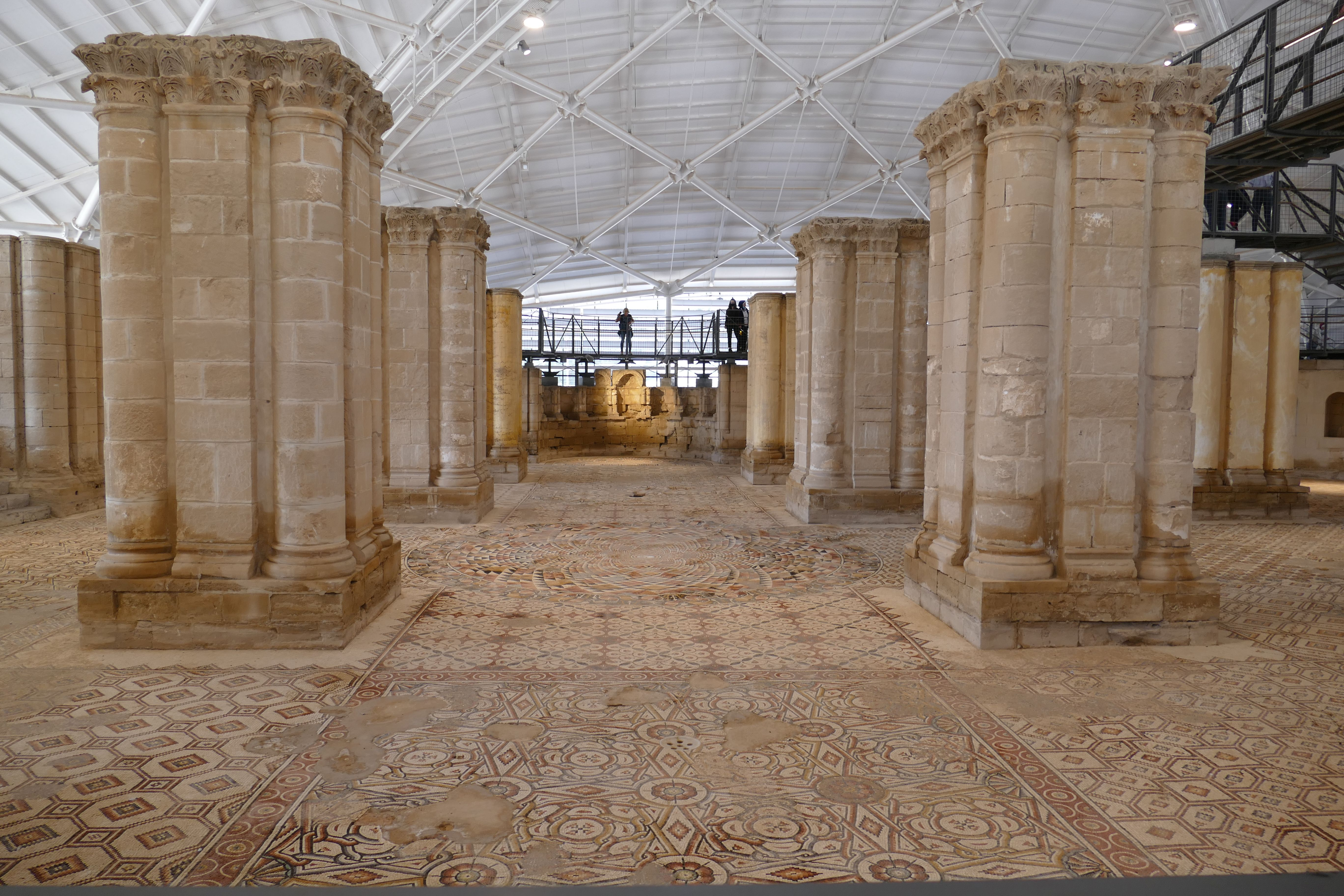
Part of the mosaic floor in the bathing hall

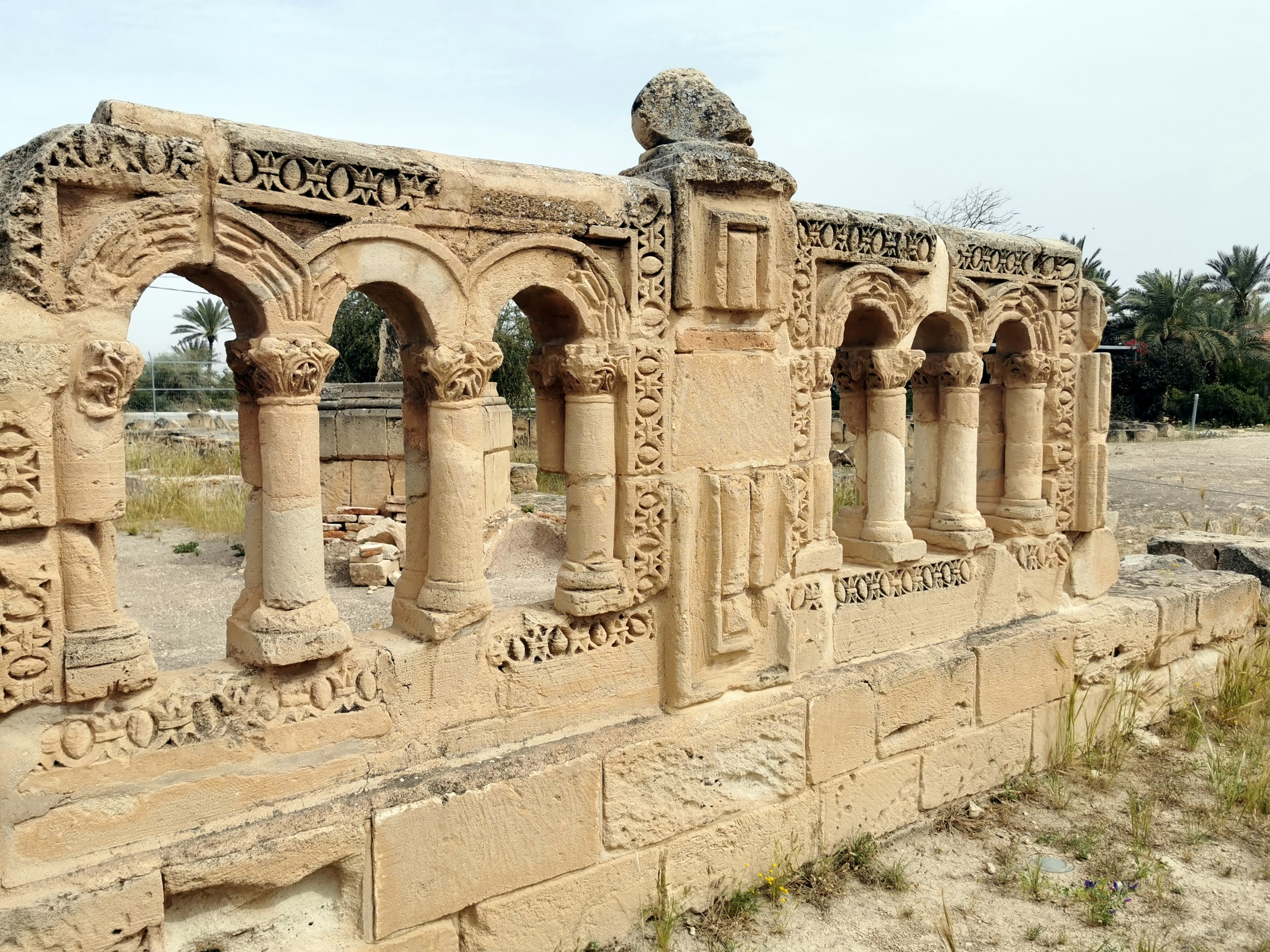
Remain arcs of the palace

== Decorative elements ==
The decorative elements at Hisham's Palace are some of the finest representations of Umayyad period art and are well documented in the publications of Robert Hamilton.

=== Mosaics ===
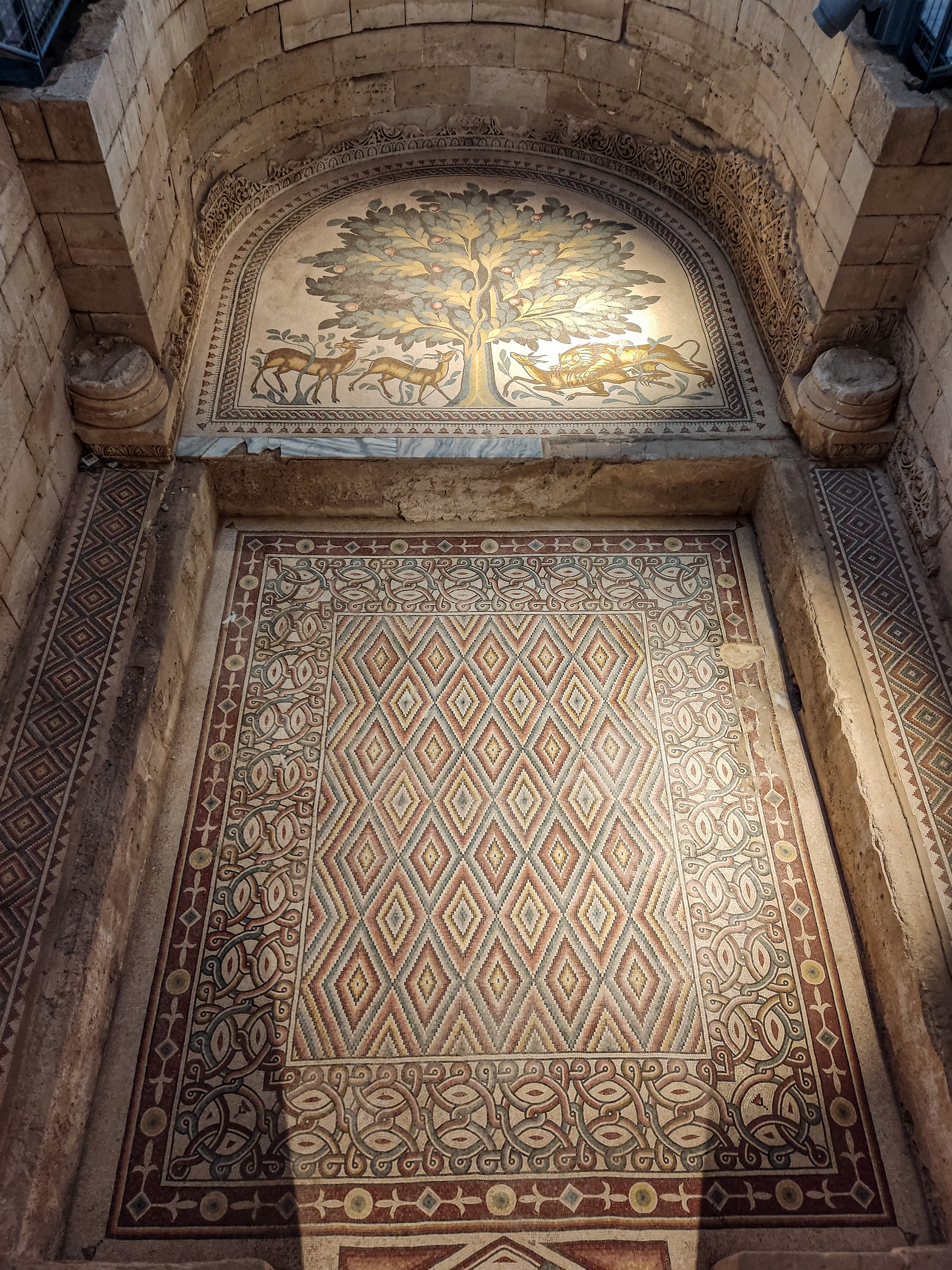
Part of the mosaic floor including the "Tree of Life" mosaic

The floor of the main bathing hall is covered with colorful geometric mosaics, at the center of which is a large kaleidoscope design. The enormous mosaic is divided into 25 square bays that are separated by pier clusters. A large variety of geometric designs cover the floor, which are rarely repeated. The colors used are primarily blue, red, green, yellow, and orange. After years of restoration funded by Japan, the mosaic covering 836 square metres (9,000 sq ft), one of the largest floor mosaics in the world, with more than five million distinctive pieces of stone from Palestine, was unveiled in October 2021. This floor mosaic is one of the largest that has survived from the ancient world.

The most famous mosaic at the site is the "Tree of Life" mosaic in the diwan, or the private audience room, located in the northwestern corner of the main bathing hall. The pavement mosaic depicts a fruiting tree with two unknowing gazelles on the left side and a lion attacking another gazelle on the right side. It is a popular design throughout Islamic history in places like Northern Syria and Transjordan, and has been a popular topic of conversation as there are numerous theories related to its meaning. One idea is that the mosaic represents the peace that the caliph brought with his military prowess. Another idea stems from the border of the mosaic, which resembles the tassels of a curtain or drape. During the Umayyad, Abbasid, and Fatimid periods, court accounts recall that the caliphs sat behind curtains from where they appeared at specified moments in various rituals. The tassels that border the "Tree of Life" mosaic may suggest that the scene of the lion and gazelles should be understood through a lens of intimacy.

All of the mosaics found at Hisham's Palace are of very high quality and feature a wide variety of colors and figural motifs.

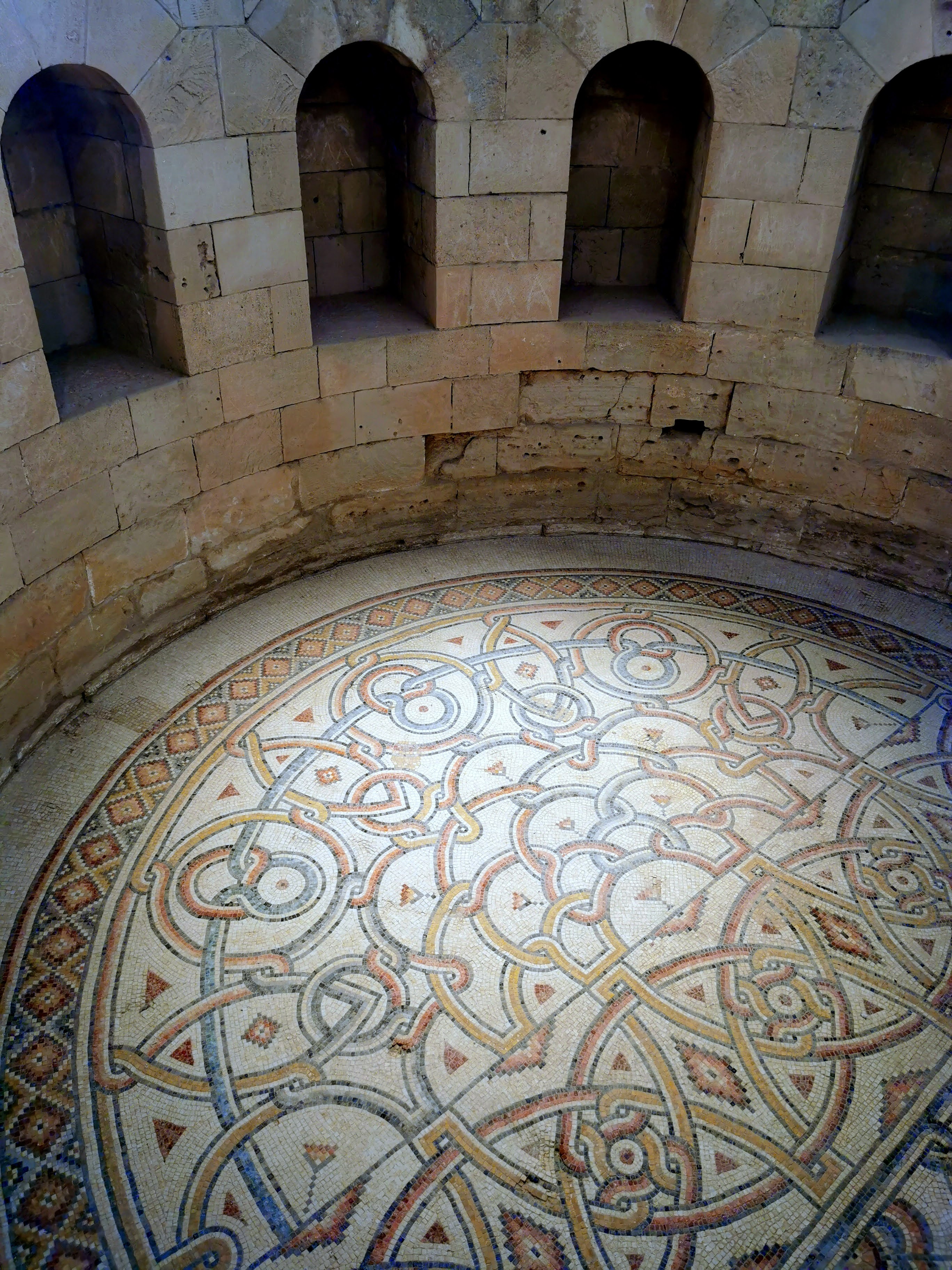

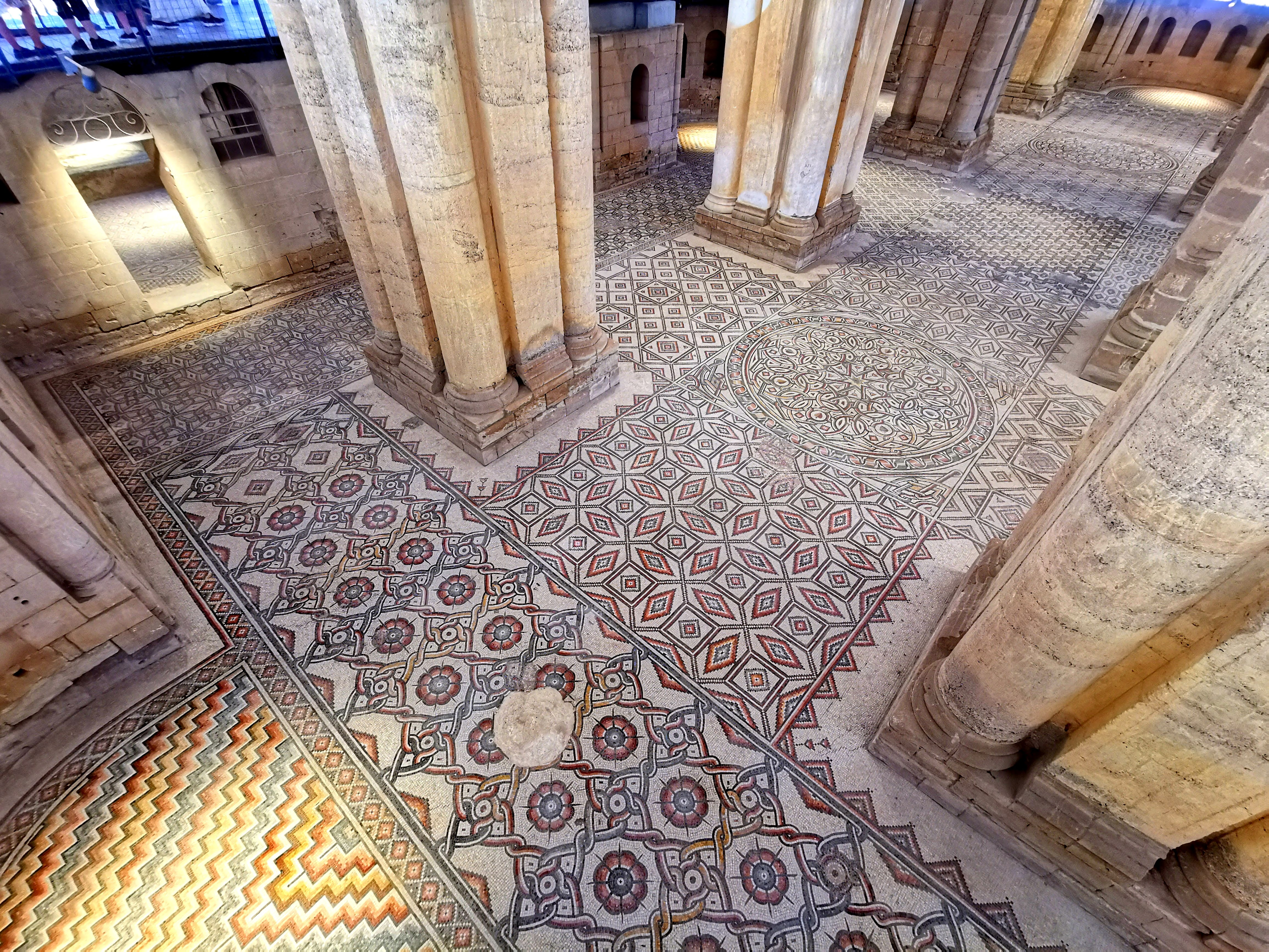

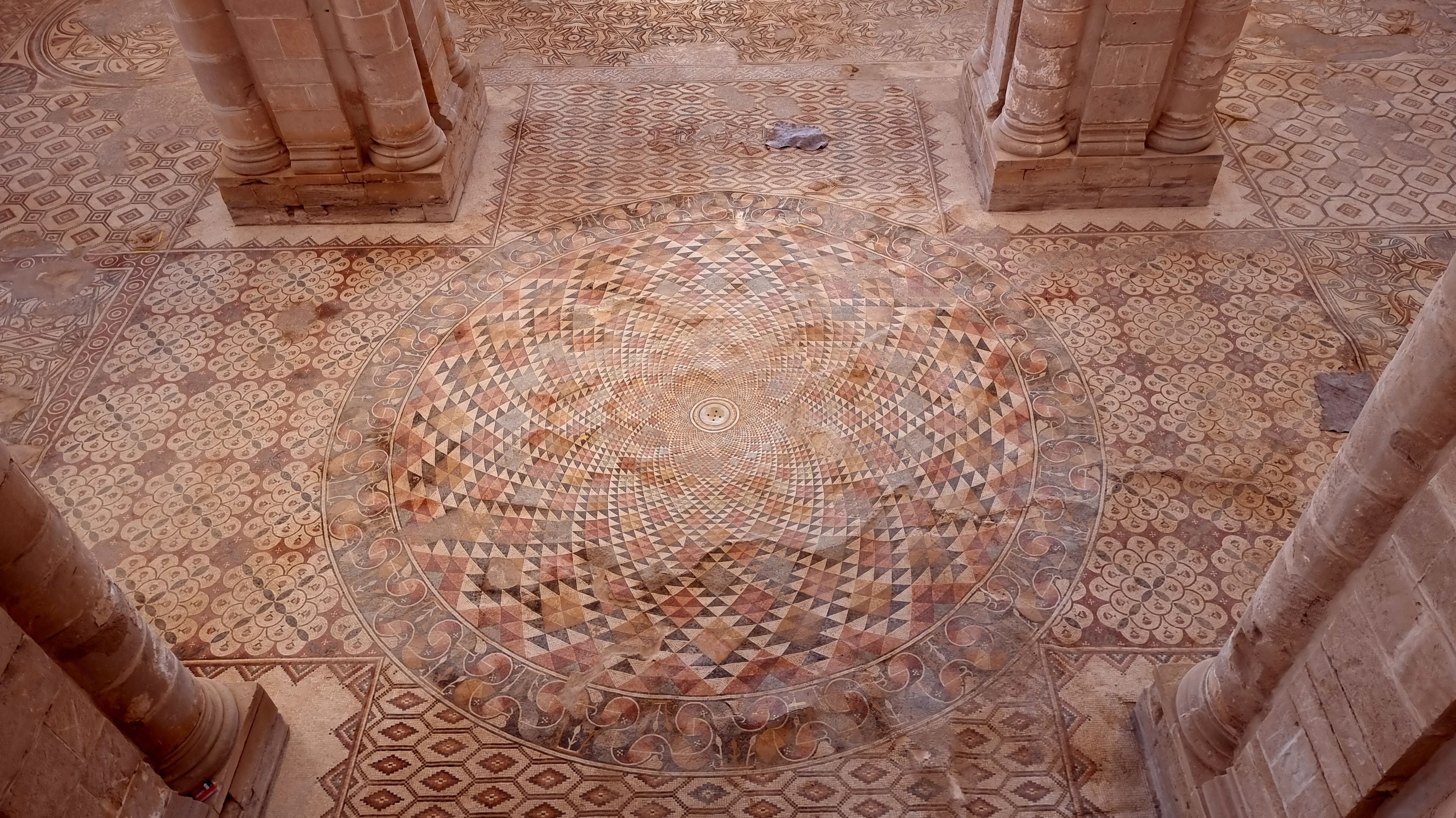

=== Carved stucco ===
The carved stucco found at the site is also of exceptional quality. Of particular note is the statue depicting a male figure with a sword, often presumed to be the caliph, which stood in a niche above the entrance to the bath hall. Additional male and female figures carved in stucco, some semi-nude, adorn the bath complex. Geometric and vegetal patterns are also quite common.

While Hamilton described the carvings at Hisham's Palace as amateurish and chaotic, many subsequent art historians have noted similarities with Iranian themes. Hana Taragan has argued that the artistic themes seen at the site are Levantine examples of an Islamic visual language of power that coalesced from Sasanian influences in Iraq. Priscilla Soucek has also drawn attention to the site's representation of the Islamic myth of Solomon.

Elements from Hisham's Palaceon display at the Rockefeller Museum, Jerusalem

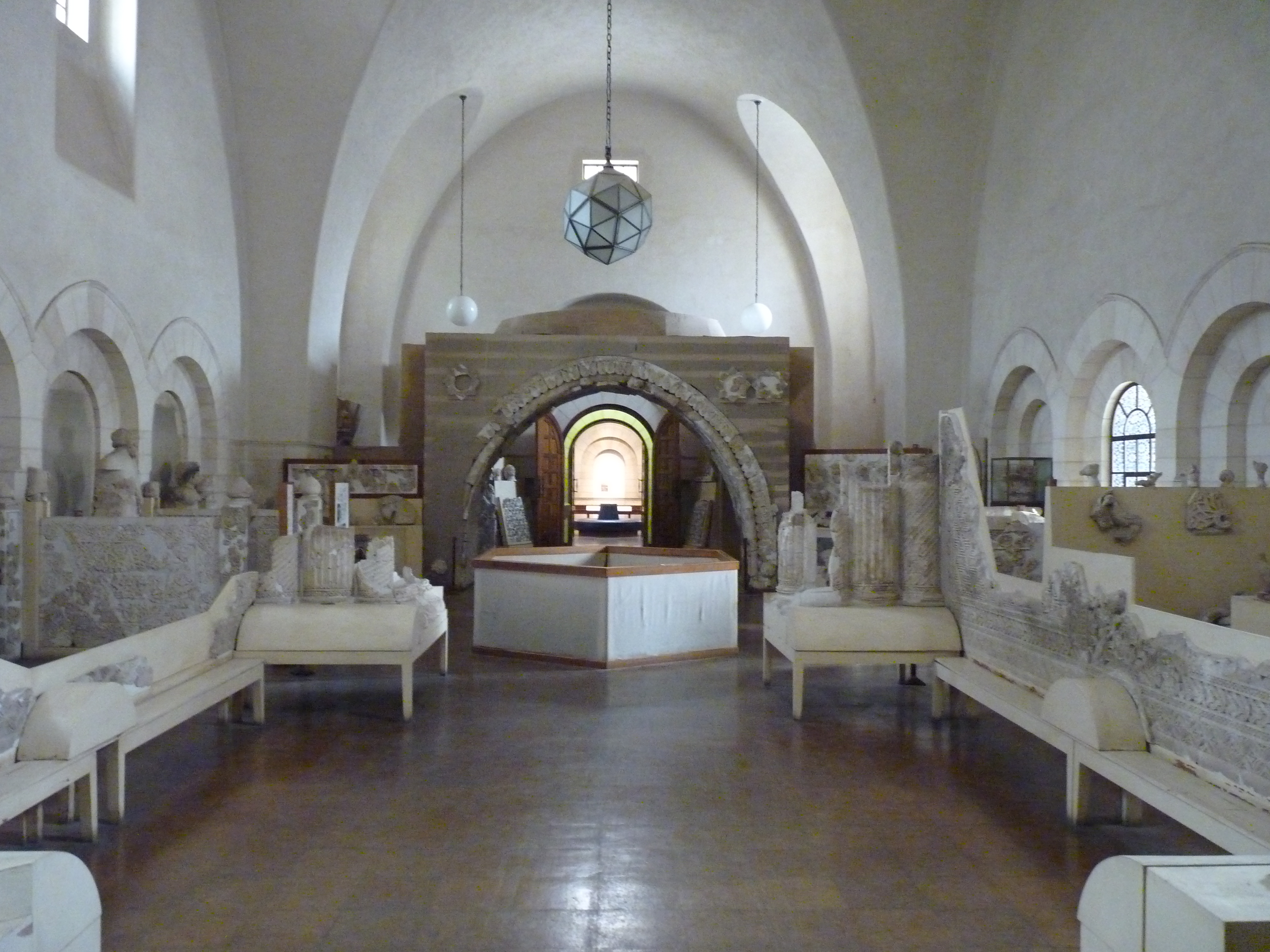
Decorations (mainly stucco)

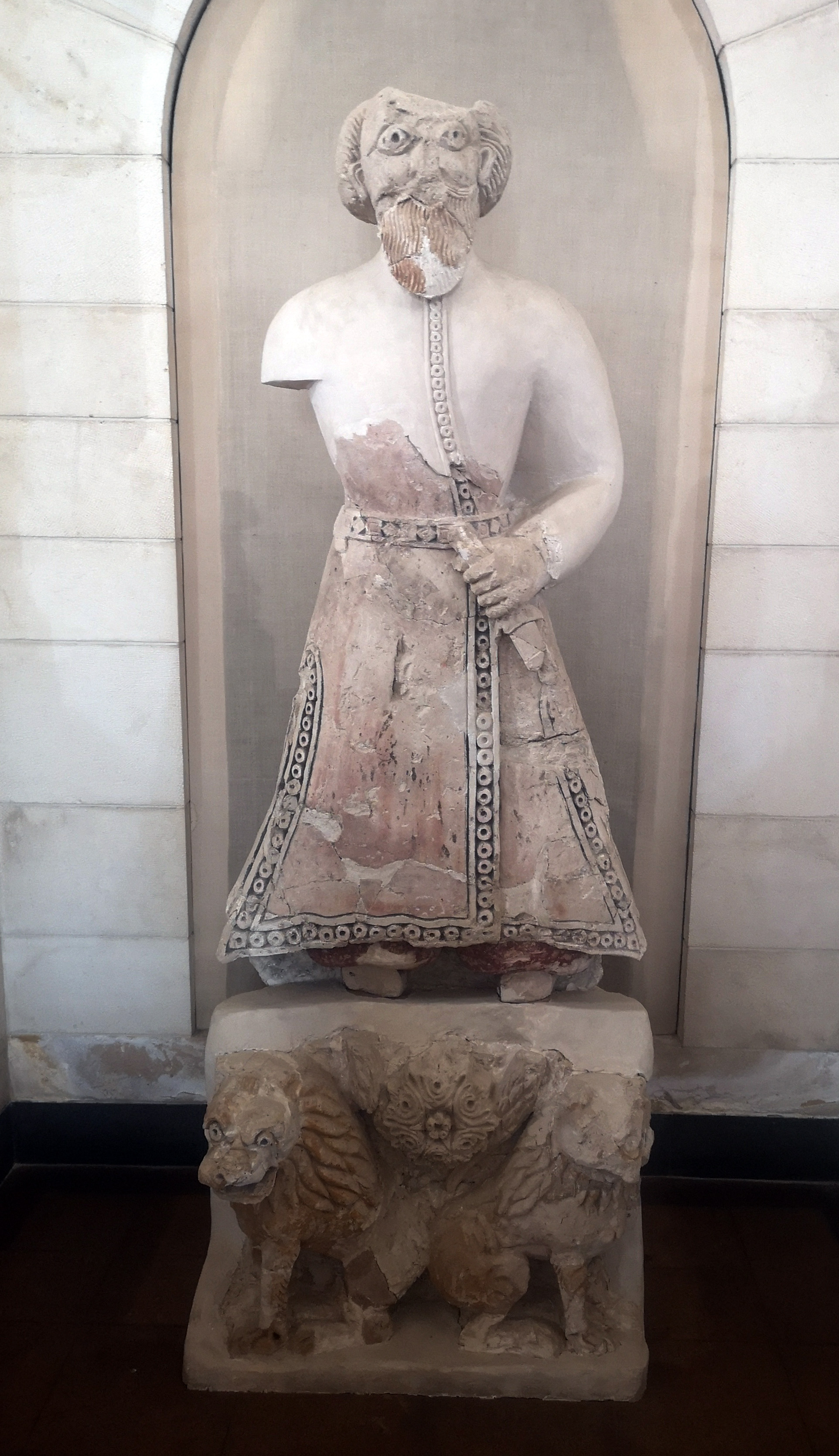
Male figure with a sword, often presumed to be the caliph

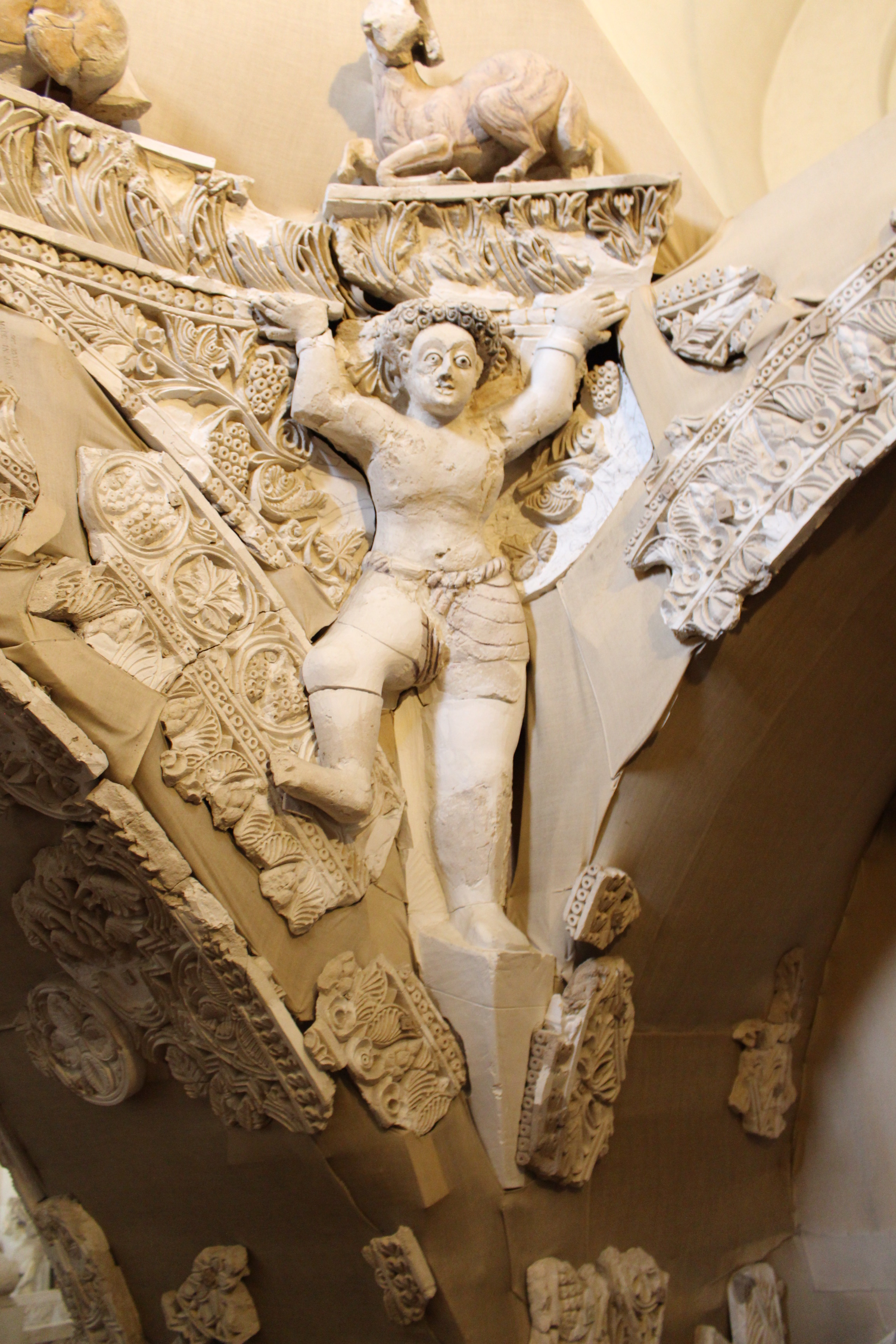
Carved stucco example

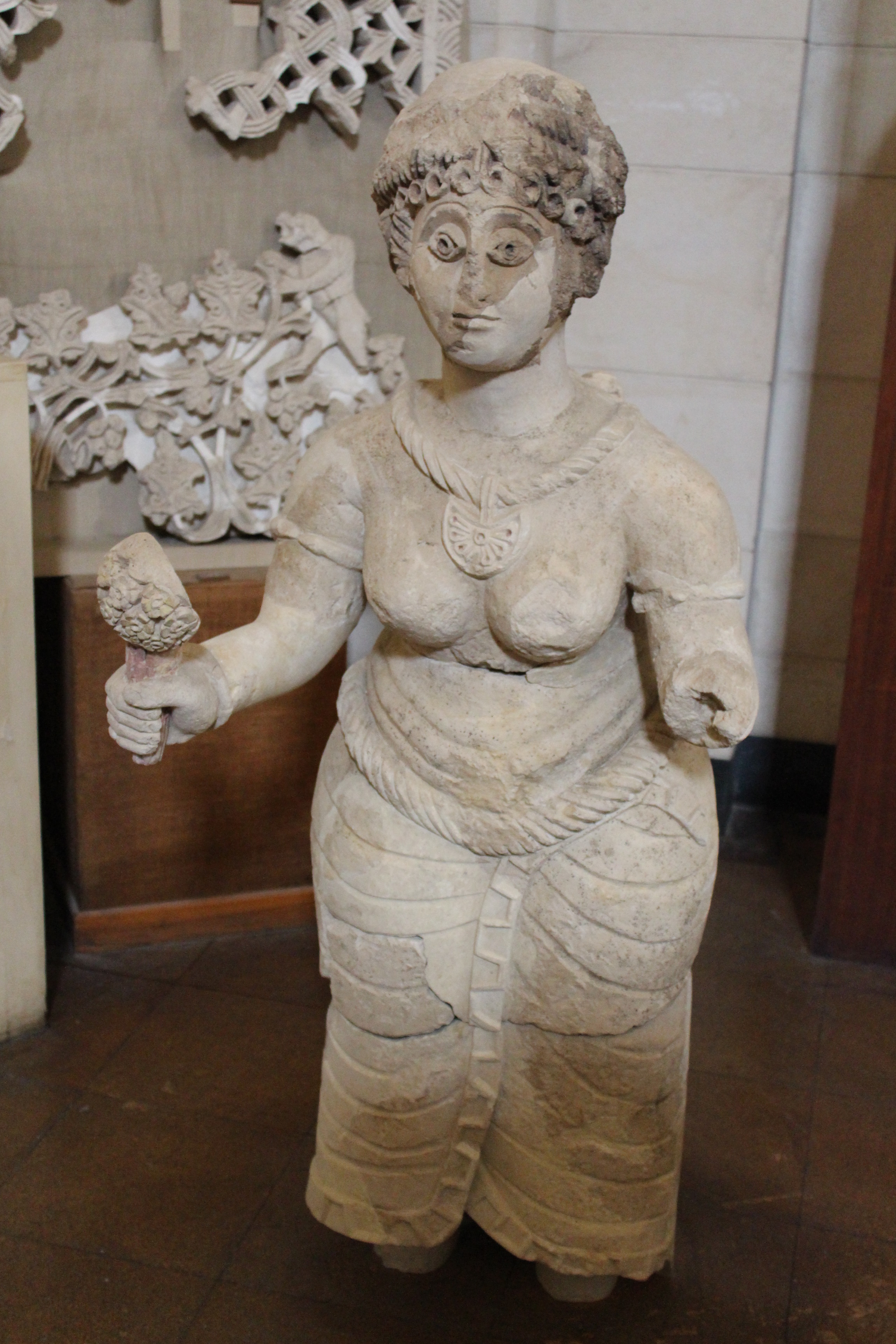
Semi-nude female figure

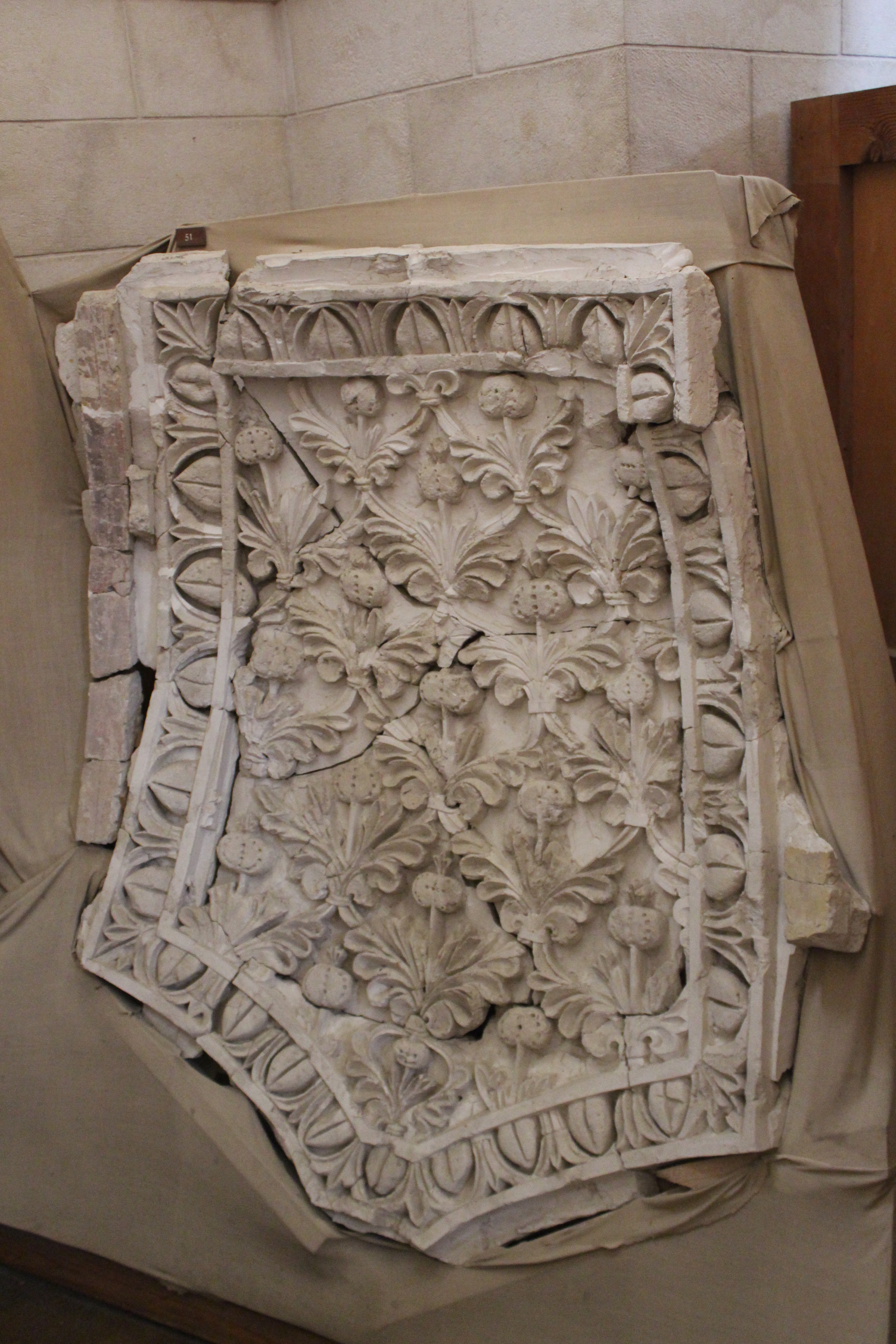
Panel

== Conservation ==
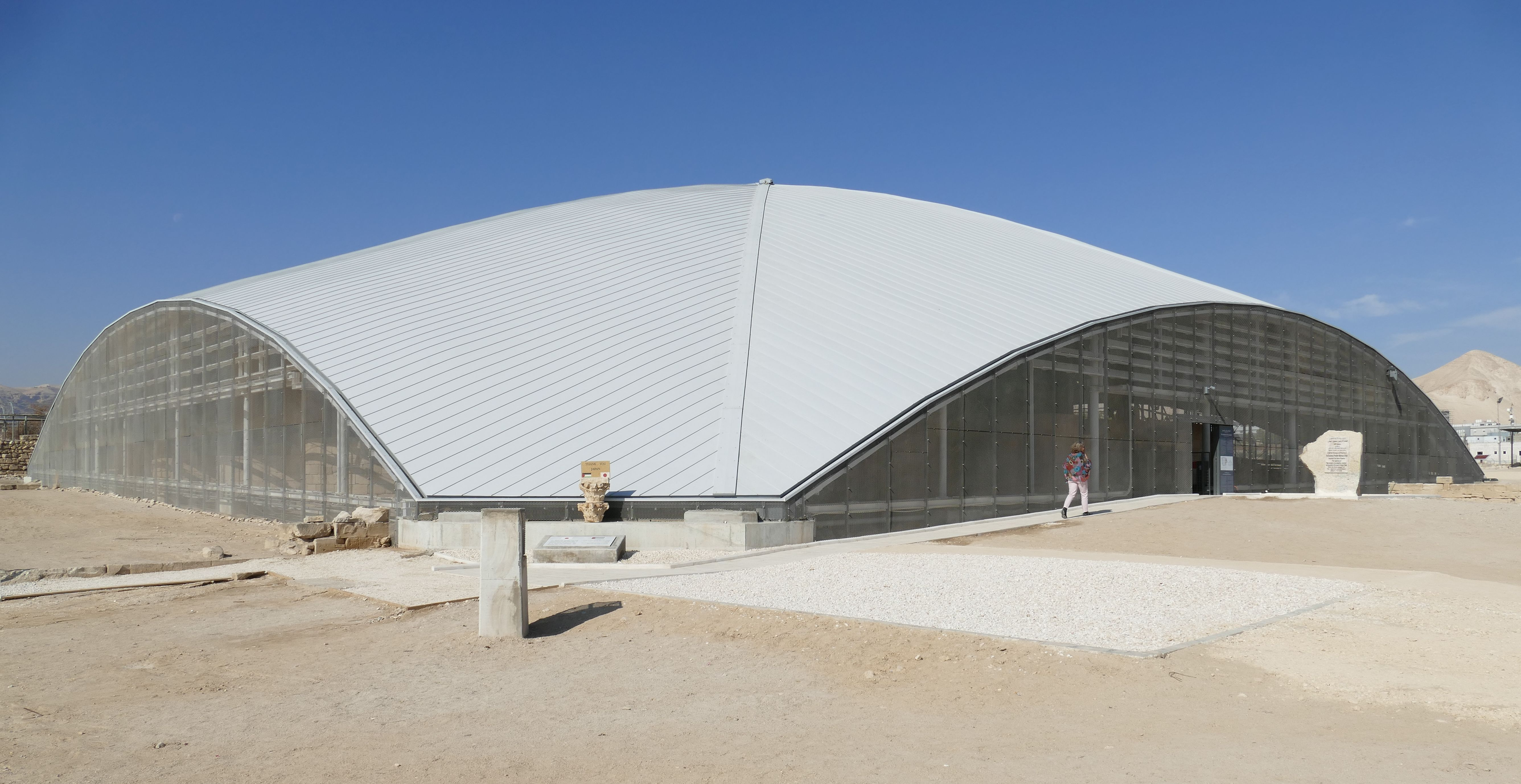
A structure protecting the mosaic floors was installed with support from the Japanese government in 2021.

According to the Global Heritage Fund (GHF), the rapid urban development of Jericho, as well as expansion of agricultural activity in the area, are limiting archaeologists' access to the site, much of which remain unexplored. Conservation efforts aimed at protecting important structures have been hindered by lack of resources. In a 2010 report titled Saving Our Vanishing Heritage, GHF identified Hisham's Palace as one of 12 worldwide heritage sites most "On the Verge" of irreparable loss and destruction. Hamdan Taha of the Ministry of Tourism and Antiquities has published reports concerning the preservation of this and other sites in the Jericho region. In 2020, it was added to the tentative list of World Heritage Sites in Palestine.

In 2021, the restoration of the bath complex's 835-square-meter mosaic floor was completed, at a cost of 12 million USD and with Japanese funding, with a dome-shaped shelter protecting the mosaics, which was designed and executed by a Japanese architecture office. The mosaics can be viewed from walkways suspended over the floor.

== Museum ==
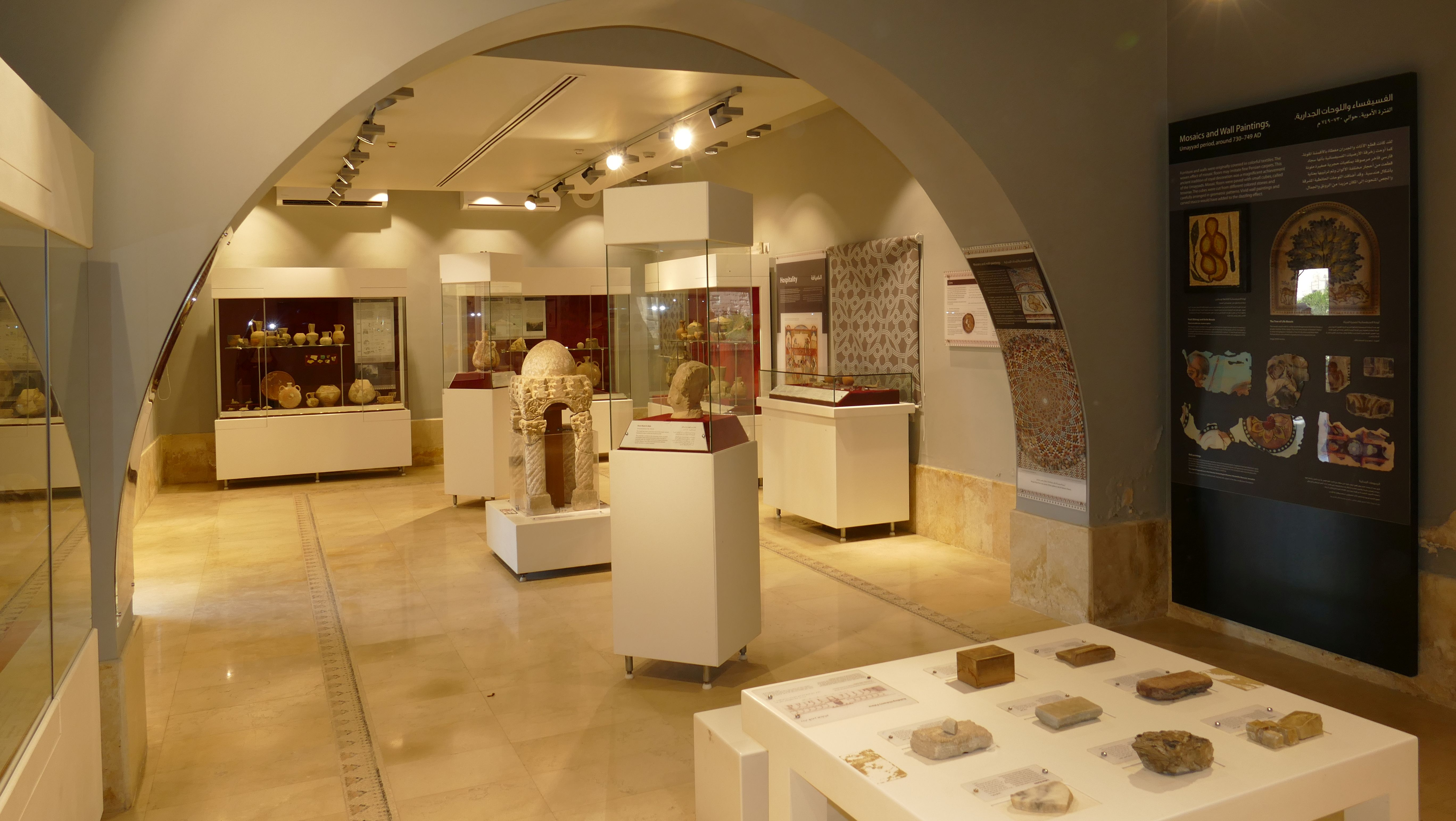
Inside the museum at Hisham's Palace

The Hisham's Palace Museum is located within the grounds of the Hisham's Palace archaeological site. The museum was established in 2000. It displays relics and examples of pottery from the Umayyad and Abbasid caliphates, discovered within the Umayyad palace complex.

== Tourism ==
Hisham's Palace is one of the most important Islamic monuments in Palestine, and is a major attraction for both visitors and Palestinians. In 2010, according to figures collected by the Ministry of Tourism and Antiquities, the site received 43,455 visitors. The site is a common field trip destination for Palestinian schoolchildren. Foreign visitors who enter Palestine through the nearby Allenby Bridge often make Hisham's Palace their first stop. The site has been visited by foreign dignitaries, and was the set for a production of Shakespeare's Richard II in 2012.

Since 2021, the mosaic floor of the bath complex has been opened to the public after the completion of restoration and preservation work and the building of a shelter provided with walkways placed above the floor.

== See also ==
- Levantine archaeology
- List of archaeological sites in Israel and Palestine
- Tell Umm el-'Amr – a World Heritage Site in Gaza which features a Byzantine bath complex
- Early medieval domes

== Bibliography ==
- Alfonsi, Laura; Cinti, Francesca (2013). "The Kinematics of the 1033 A.D. Earthquake Revealed by the Damage at Hisham Palace (Jordan Valley, Dead Sea Transform Zone)". Seismological Research Letters. 84 (6): 997–1003. Bibcode:2013SeiRL..84..997A. doi:10.1785/0220130060.
- Bacharach, Jere (1996). "Marwanid Umayyad building activities: speculations on patronage". Muqarnas. 13: 27–44. doi:10.1163/22118993-90000355.
- Baer, Eva. "Khirbat al-Mafjar." Encyclopaedia of Islam 2nd ed.
- Behrens-Abouseif, Doris (1997). "The Lion-Gazelle Mosaic at Khirbat al-Mafjar". Muqarnas. 14: 11–18. doi:10.1163/22118993-90000367.
- Bloom, Jonathan; Blair, Sheila (1997). Islamic Arts. Phaidon.
- Bliss, Frederick (1894). "Notes on the Plain of Jericho". Palestinian Exploration Fund Quarterly Statement: 175–183. doi:10.1179/peq.1894.26.3.175.
- Hamilton, Robert W. (1988) Walid and his Friends: An Umayyad Tragedy Oxford: Oxford University Press.
- Ken-Tor, Revital; Agnon, Amotz; Enzel, Yehouda; Stein, Mordechai; Marco, Shmuel; Negendank, Jorg F. W. (2001). "High-resolution geological record of historic earthquakes in the Dead Sea basin". Journal of Geophysical Research: Solid Earth. 106 (B2): 2221–2234. Bibcode:2001JGR...106.2221K. doi:10.1029/2000jb900313.
- Lash, Mordechay; Goldstein, Yossi; Shai, Itzhaq (2020). "Underground – Archaeological Research in the West Bank, 1948–1967: Management, Complexity, and Israeli Involvement". Bulletin of the History of Archaeology. 30. doi:10.5334/bha-650.
- Northedge, Alastair (2003), "Khirbat Al-Mafjar", Grove Art Online, doi:10.1093/gao/9781884446054.article.T046439
- Soucek, Priscilla. (1993) "Solomon's Throne/Solomon's Bath: Model or Metaphor." Ars Orientalis Vol. 23: 109–134.
- Ṭāhā, Ḥamdān. (2005) "Rehabilitation of Hisham's Palace in Jericho." in F. Maniscalco ed. Tutela, Conservazione e Valorizzazione del Patrimonio Culturale della Palestina. Naples. 179–188.
- Ṭāhā, Ḥamdān (2010). "The current state of archaeology in Palestine". Present Pasts. 2 (1): 16–25. doi:10.5334/pp.17.
- Ṭāhā, Ḥamdān; Whitcomb, Donald S. (2015). The Mosaics of Khirbet el-Mafjar: Hisham's palace. Chicago: The Oriental Institute of the University of Chicago. ISBN 978-1-61491-004-6.
- Taragan, Hana. (2003) "Atlas Transformed--Interpreting the 'Supporting Figures' in the Umayyad Palace at Khirbat al-Mafjar." East and West Vol. 53: 9–29.
- Whitcomb, Donald. (1988) "Khirbat al-Mafjar Reconsidered: The Ceramic Evidence". Bulletin of the American Schools of Oriental Research 271: 51–67. doi:10.2307/1357040
- Whitcomb, Donald (2013). "Dimitri Baramki: Discovering Qasr Hisham" (PDF). Jerusalem Quarterly. 55: 78–82. doi:10.70190/jq.I55.p78.
- Whitcomb, Donald; Jennings, Michael; Creekmore, Andrew; Arce, Ignacio (2016). "Khirbet al-Mafjar: New Excavations and Hypotheses for an Umayyad Monument". Near Eastern Archaeology. 79 (2): 78–87. doi:10.5615/neareastarch.79.2.0078. JSTOR 10.5615/neareastarch.79.2.0078.
- Whitcomb, Donald; Ṭāhā, Ḥamdān (2013). "Khirbat al-Mafjar and Its Place in the Archaeological Heritage of Palestine". Journal of Eastern Mediterranean Archaeology and Heritage Studies. 1 (1): 54–65. doi:10.5325/jeasmedarcherstu.1.1.0054. JSTOR 10.5325/jeasmedarcherstu.1.1.0054.
- Yegül, Fikret K.; Gendrop, Paul; McLeod, Madeline (3 June 2019). "Bath (ii)". Grove Art Online. doi:10.1093/gao/9781884446054.article.T006848.
