= Maluti temples =

Temples of Maluti village of India

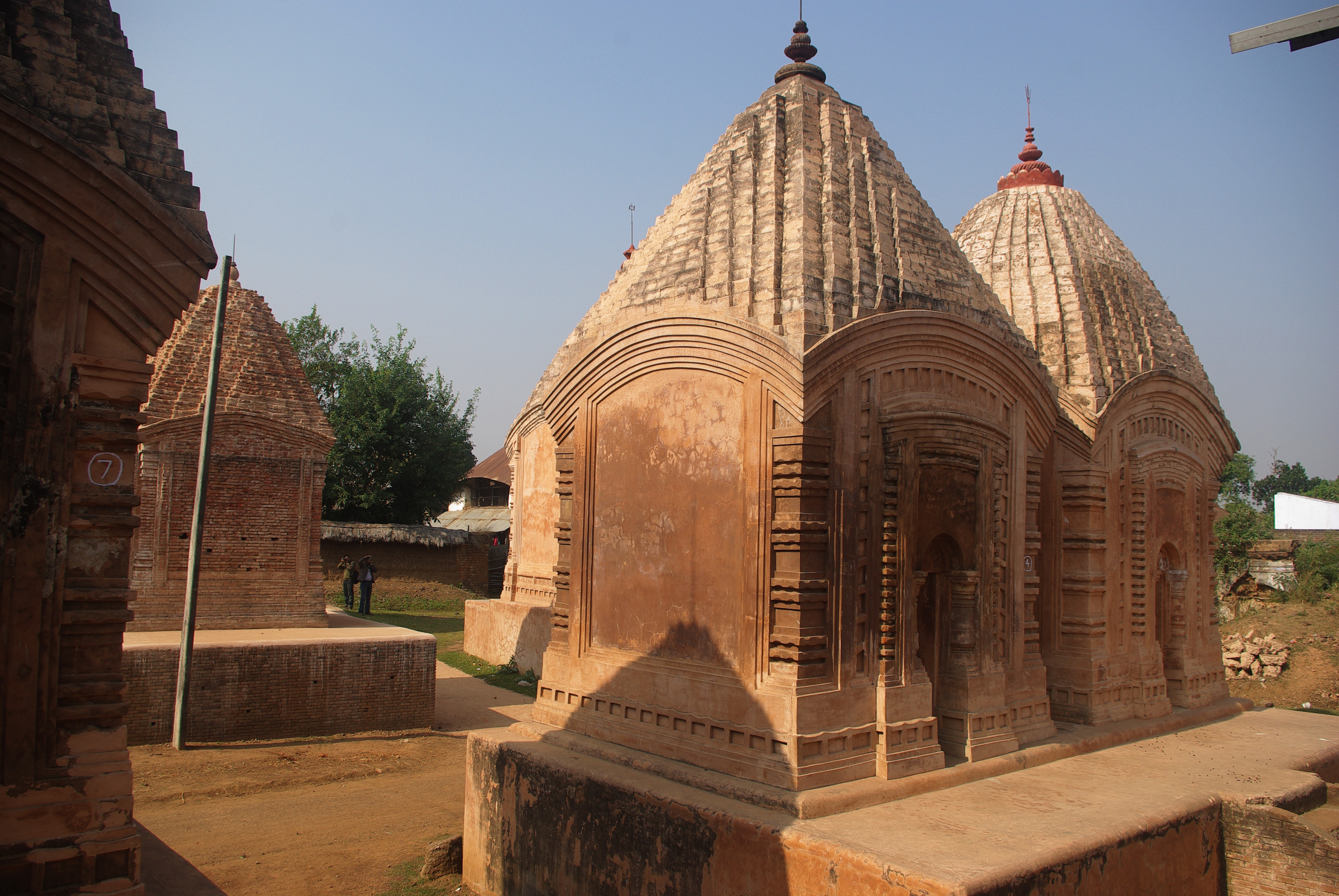
- View of some of Maluti temples

- Location in Malati village, Jharkhand

Religion
- Affiliation: Hinduism
- District: Dumka district
- Deity: Shiva Mauliksha devi
- Festival: Kali Puja

Location
- Location: Maluti
- State: Jharkhand
- Country: India
- Coordinates: 24°09′N 87°40′E

Architecture
- Type: Bengal temple architecture
- Completed: 17th to 19th century
- Monument: 78+8

Maluti temples are a group of 72 extant terracotta temples (out of the original number of 108), located in the Maluti village near Shikaripara in Dumka district on the eastern part of the Chota Nagpur Plateau, Indian state of Jharkhand. These temples, according to the Indian Trust for Rural Heritage and Development (ITRHD), were built between the 17th and 19th centuries. The kings of Baj Basanta dynasty built these temples in Maluti, their capital, inspired by goddess Mowlakshi, their family deity. Many of the temples are deified with different denominations of gods and goddesses, apart from the tutelary deity Mowlakshi, and others such as Shiva, Durga, Kali and Vishnu. The Global Heritage Fund (GHF) has proposed a conservation effort, which would increase tourism to the Maluti village. GHF has declared this site as one of the world's 12 most endangered cultural heritage sites.

== Location ==
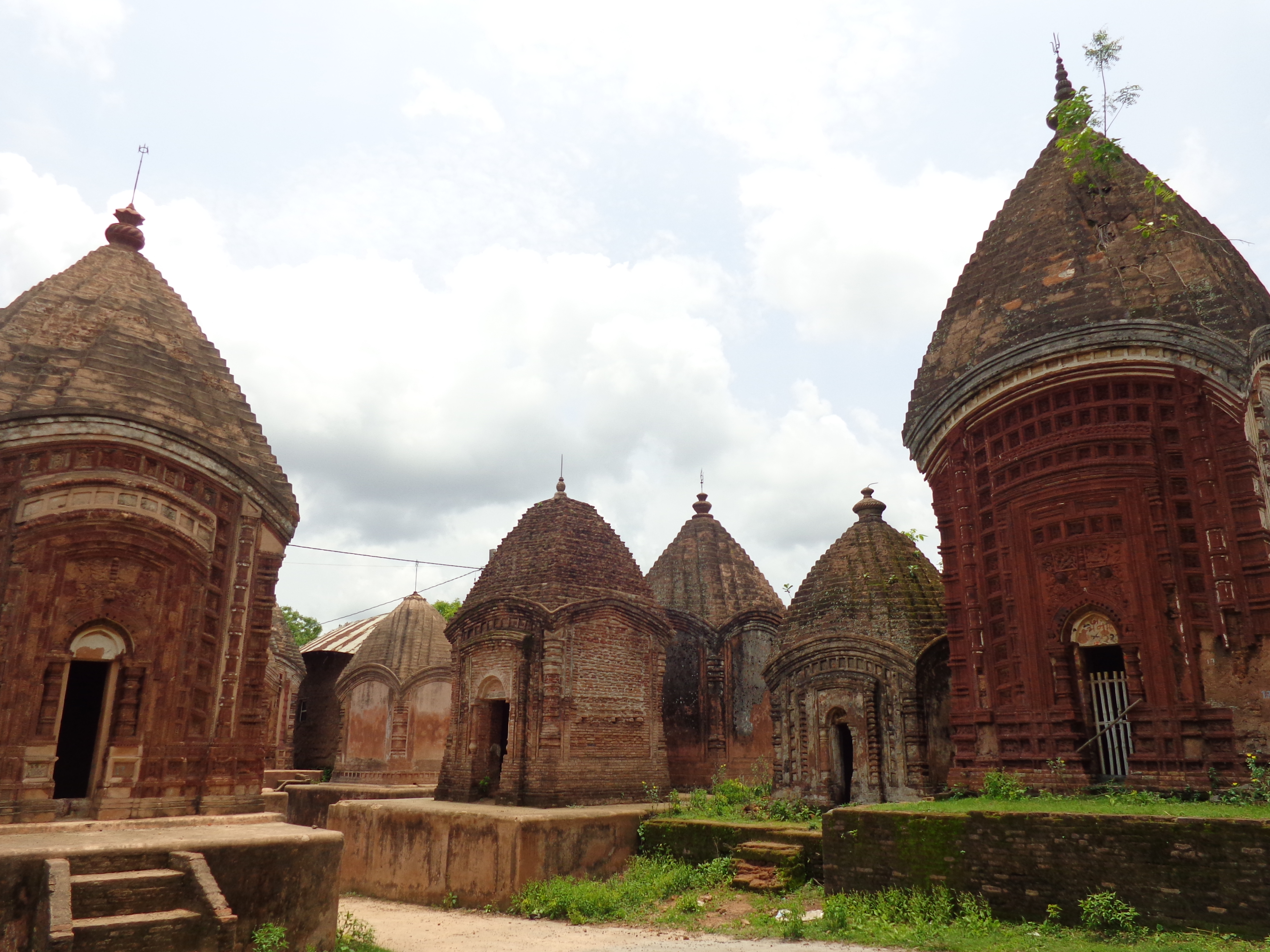
Maluti temples

The extant Maluti terracotta temples are 72 which were built in four groups in Maluti near the border between Jharkhand and West Bengal. The Chila river flows through the village and meets the Dwarka river, close to Tarapith.

Rampurhat, in Birbhum, West Bengal is the nearest railway station to the temple complex. Trains operate from Calcutta. Bus services operate from Rampurhat and also from Dumka. The distance from Maluti to Dumka, the district headquarters, is 55 kilometres (34 mi), and Rampurhat to Maluti is 16 kilometres (9.9 mi).

== History ==
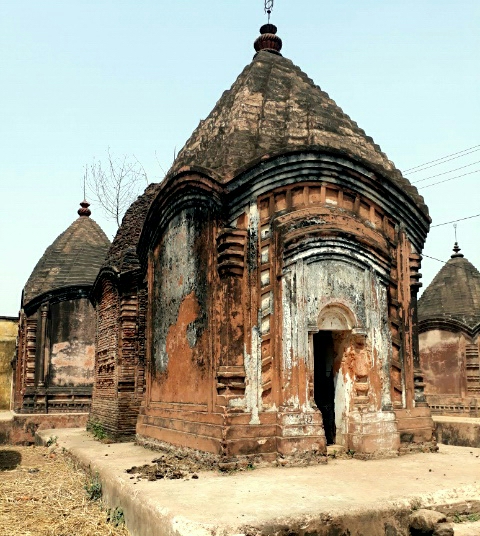
Maluti Temple

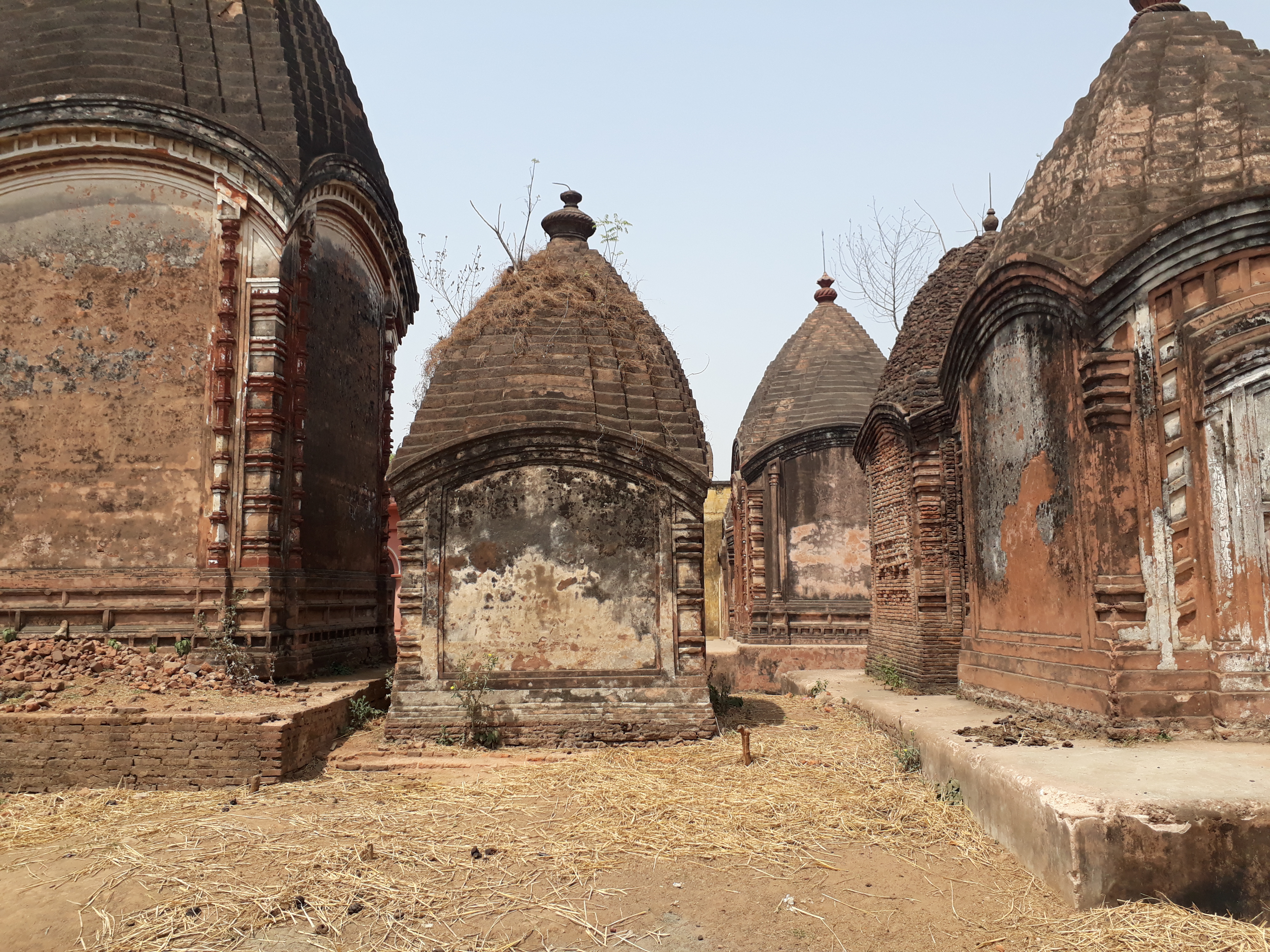
Temples in Maluti, jharkhand

History of these temples is directly linked to the gift of the kingdom of Maluti, then known as "Nankar Raj" (meaning: tax-free kingdom"), that was granted to a Brahmin named Basanta by the Muslim ruler Alauddin Husain Shah of Gaura (1495–1525) for having saved his hawk (Baj) and returning it to him. Consequently, Basanta was given the suffix Raja and called Raja Baj Basanta. As Basanta was a religious person, he preferred building temples instead of palaces. Subsequently, his family divided into four clans and they continued to build the temples in Maluti, their capital, in clusters, inspired by goddess Mowlakshi, their family deity. The name Maluti is said to be derived from Mallahati, the Malla Kings of Bankura. The Indian Trust for Rural Heritage and Development (ITRHD), has dated the building of these temples between the 17th and 19th centuries. The Maluti temples were not known to the outside world until A.K.Sinha, Director of Archaeology, Government of Bihar, publicized them, for the first time in 1979.

== Features ==
Initially there were 108 temples built in the village, within a radius of 350 metres (1,150 ft), all dedicated to Lord Shiva. Of the 108 temples, only 72 still stand, but in a semi-dilapidated condition; the other 36 temples have been lost. Many of the temples are deified with different denominations of gods and goddesses, apart from the tutelary deity Mauliksha, and others such as Shiva, Durga, Kali and Vishnu.

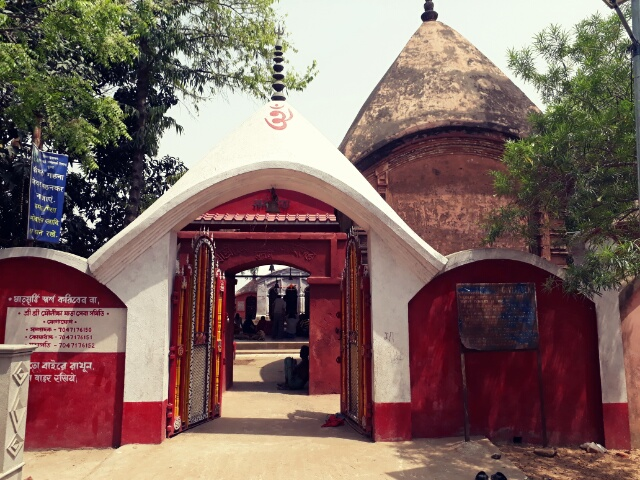
Bamakhyapa's Temple

Apart from the Shiva temples, there are also eight temples dedicated to Goddess Kali. There is a temple dedicated to a saint known as Bamakhyapa where his trident has been deified. Another important temple is that of Manasa Devi. The family deity of the Baj Basanta dynasty is goddess Mauliskha which is widely worshiped and devotees visit the Mauliskha temple all through the year; the goddess is deified facing west and is said to be the elder sister of goddess Tara.

The temples, designed in different styles, which were then popular throughout Bengal, by the artisans from Bengal, are grouped under five categories and none of them are in the architectural styles of the Nagara, Vesara or Dravida. According to Mc Cutchion, these temples were built to the Cara-cala design which consists of a square chamber "surmounted internally by a dome built over pendentives" with corbelled cornices which give the appearance of a hut-shaped roof.

The temples have been decorated with sculptures of episodes from the epic Mahabharata and Ramayana, and the fight between Durga and Mahishasura. Scenes of village life are also carved at some locations of the temples. There are a few inscriptions also on the temples which give details of building of the temples and also on the socio-political history of that period. These are inscribed and dated as "shaka era" (Indian national calendar), in early Bengali script which is a combination of Sanskrit, Prakrit and Bengali.

== Conservation ==
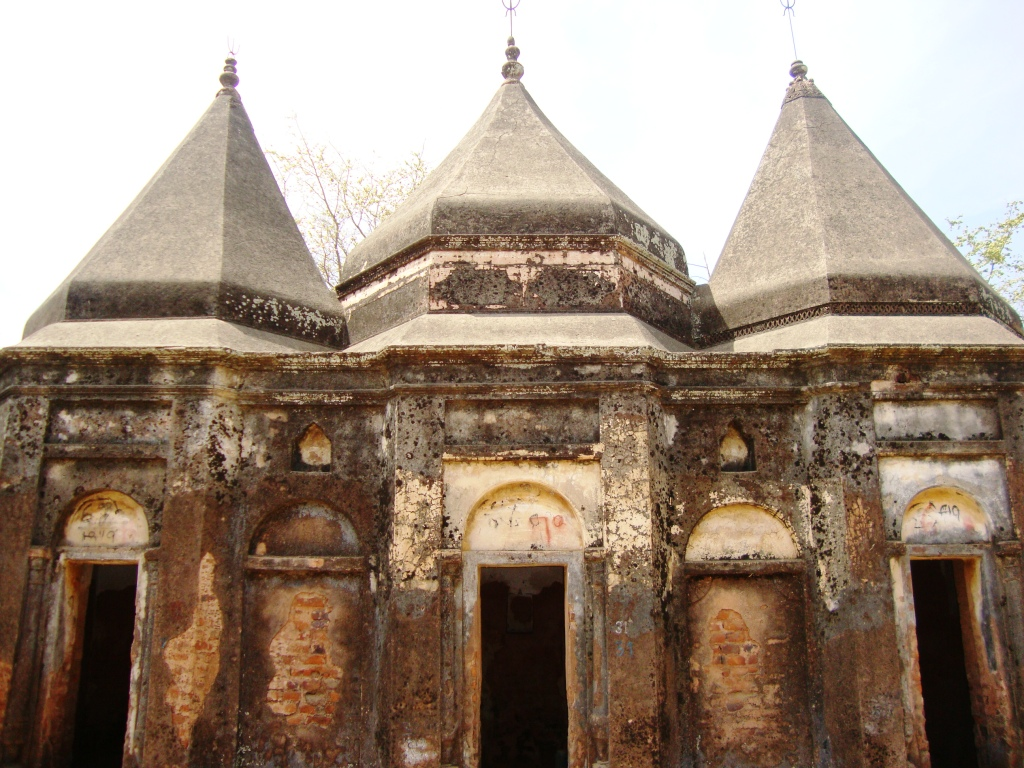
Square chambered hut type temples in a semi ruined condition

The first steps taken to conserve the Maluti temples were taken by an NGO called "Save Heritage and Environment (SHE)". They approached the Global Heritage Fund (GHF) to provide support.

The Global Heritage Fund (GHF) and the Indian Trust for Rural and Heritage Development instituted a study to prepare plans for the conservation of the Maluti temples. The study identified each temple's conservation details and the threats to the temple structures. The report also indicated the names of international organizations which could provide funds and expertise for such restoration whilst retaining the traditional characteristics of the terracotta tiled sloping roofs of the temples. It recommended that this activity should be carried out by "strengthening the local community through education, awareness and a greater stake in the conservation process".

The GHF has now included the temples and the village among "the world’s twelve vanishing cultural heritage sites". Maluti is the lone representative from India on GHF's list of "the world’s twelve vanishing cultural heritage sites".

== Bibliography ==
- Dutta, Sudip (2007). Environment Concerns And Perspectives. APH Publishing. ISBN 978-81-313-0170-8.
- Jhā, Surendra (2009). Synthesis of Buddhist Śaiva & Śākta tantras. Pratibha Prakashan. ISBN 978-81-7702-197-4.
