= Hamdan Taha =

Palestinian archaeologist

- حمدان طه
- Citizenship: Palestinian
- Occupations: Archaeologist; University lecturer

Academic background
- Education: Birzeit University (Bachelor's degree); University of Jordan (Master's degree); Free University of Berlin (PhD)
- Thesis: (1990)

Academic work
- Discipline: Archaeology
- Institutions: Birzeit University; Department of Antiquities; Ministry of Tourism and Antiquities

Hamdan Taha (Arabic: حمدان طه) is a Palestinian archaeologist. He taught at Birzeit University before becoming the director general of the Palestinian Department of Antiquities and Cultural Heritage. Taha later worked for the Ministry of Tourism and Antiquities until he retired in 2014. He has led archaeological fieldwork at sites including Jericho, Hisham's Palace, and Khirbet Belameh.

== Early life and education ==
Taha was raised in al-Shuyukh, a town in the West Bank. He studied archaeology at the universities of Birzeit, Jordan, and the Free University of Berlin where he respectively completed a bachelor's degree, a master's degree, and a doctorate of philosophy.

== Career ==
In 1990 Taha joined Birzeit University's Palestinian Institute of Archaeology – which had been created three years earlier – as a professor of archaeology. He worked there for two years.

Taha was involved in the establishment of the Palestinian Department of Antiquities and Cultural Heritage in 1994, and from 1995 to 2004 was its director general. From 1995, the Palestinian Authority was responsible for archaeology in the Gaza Strip and Areas A and B of the West Bank, and some parts of Area C. In this capacity, Taha was involved in a number of archaeological projects. He led rescue excavations at Jericho in 1997 with Nicolò Marchetti, Khirbet Belameh in 1997–98, and at the site of Bir el-Hammam monastery on Mount Gerizim in 2001. Along with Moain Sadeq, the director of the Department of Antiquities in Gaza, Taha was involved with negotiations with Israel about the return of artefacts excavated in Palestine during the Israeli occupation.

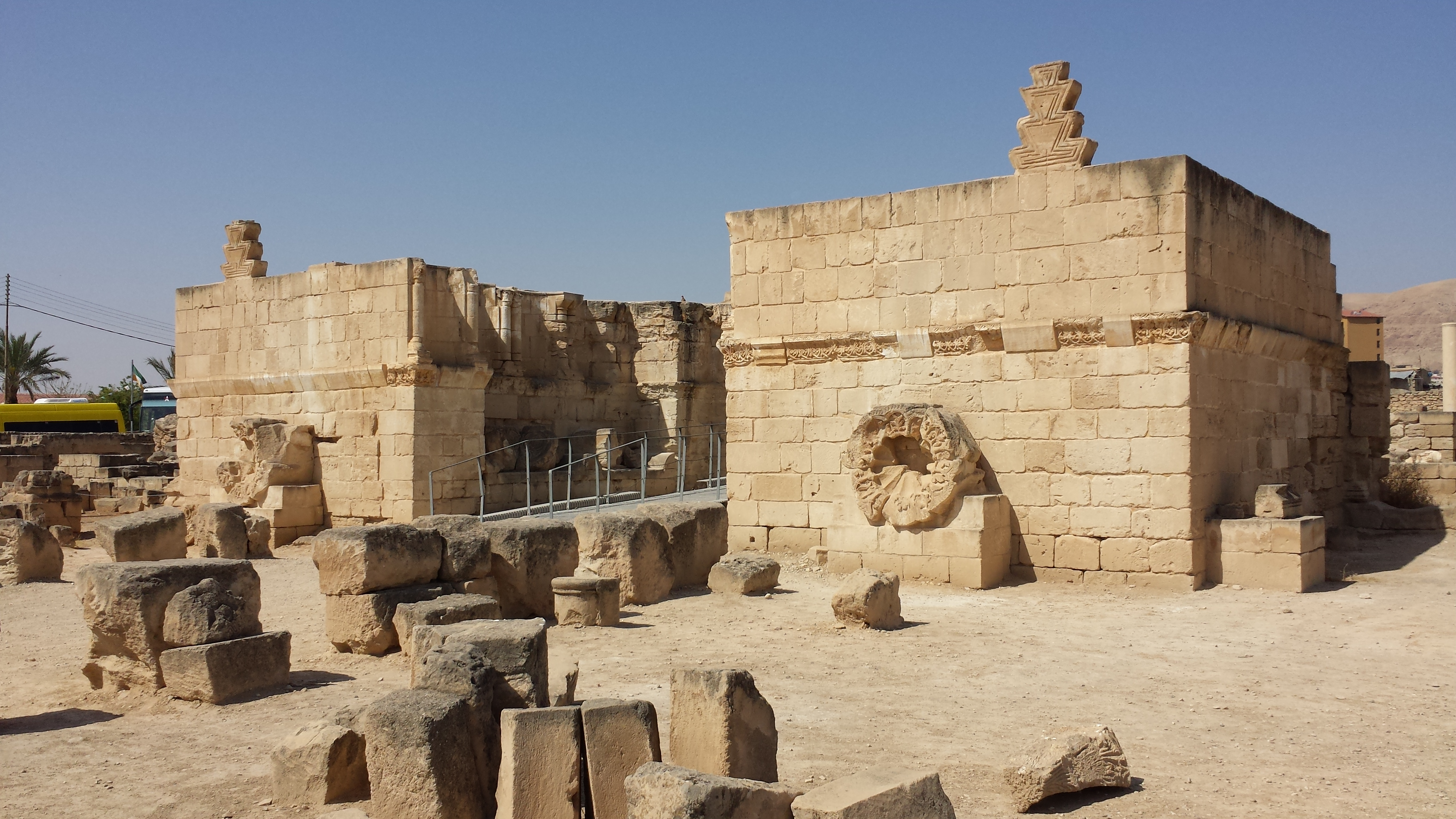
Taha co-led excavations at Hisham's Palace (also known as Khirbat al-Mafjar) in the West Bank.

In 2002, the Department of Antiquities and Cultural Heritage merged with the Department of Cultural Heritage and was part of the Ministry of Tourism and Antiquities. From 2004, Taha worked as Assistant Undersecretary for the Antiquities and Cultural Heritage Sector until 2012, and then as an undersecretary at the Ministry of Tourism and Antiquities until 2014. Taha advocated for Palestine joining UNESCO, and was subsequently the coordinator for World Heritage initiatives in Palestine. During this time he remained involved with fieldwork projects and led research excavations with Donald Whitcomb at Hisham's Palace, an early Islamic archaeological site in the West Bank, from 2006 until 2014 when Taha retired.

Taha has used his position to insist that international projects at archaeological sites in Palestine involve collaboration with Palestinian archaeologists. Taha characterises Palestinian-led archaeology as aiming to "write an inclusive narrative of [Palestinian] history, drawing on primary sources that incorporate the voices of all peoples, groups, cultures and religions that have lived on the land of Palestine". He has also criticised the Israeli government's approach to heritage in the region. When the Israel Museum held an exhibition on King Herod in 2013, Taha criticised the display of artefacts excavated in the West Bank which were removed without consultation with Palestinian authorities.
