= Saving Our Vanishing Heritage =

Saving Our Vanishing Heritage: Safeguarding Endangered Cultural Heritage Sites in the Developing World was a report released by Global Heritage Fund on October 17, 2010. It illuminated five accelerating man-made threats facing global heritage sites in developing countries: development pressures, unsustainable tourism, insufficient management, looting, and war and conflict.

Based on these threats, the report surveyed 500 major archaeological and heritage sites in developing countries to evaluate current loss and destruction, conservation and development. It identified nearly 200 of these sites as "At Risk” or “Under Threat,” and the following 12 as “On the Verge” of irreparable loss and destruction:

- Bangladesh’s Mahasthangarh
- Guatemala’s Mirador
- Haiti’s Sans-Souci Palace
- India’s Maluti Temples
- Iraq’s Nineveh
- Kenya’s Lamu
- Cyprus’ Famagusta
- Pakistan’s Taxila
- Palestine’s Hisham’s Palace
- Philippines’ Intramuros and Fort Santiago
- Turkey’s Ani
- Ukraine’s Chersonesos

The report's editorial committee was composed of 24 experts in global heritage conservation and sustainable development from leading universities, institutions and international agencies, including the World Archaeological Congress, Archaeological Institute of America, ICOMOS (International Council on Monuments and Sites), Stanford University, the University of Pennsylvania, University College of London, and others.

The report has garnered much attention from major media, including National Geographic, CNN, Wall Street Journal, Reuters, Huffington Post, MSNBC, USA Today, and more.

== See also ==
- UNESCO Intangible Cultural Heritage Lists
- World Heritage Site
