= Global Heritage Fund =

Non-profit organisation in the USA

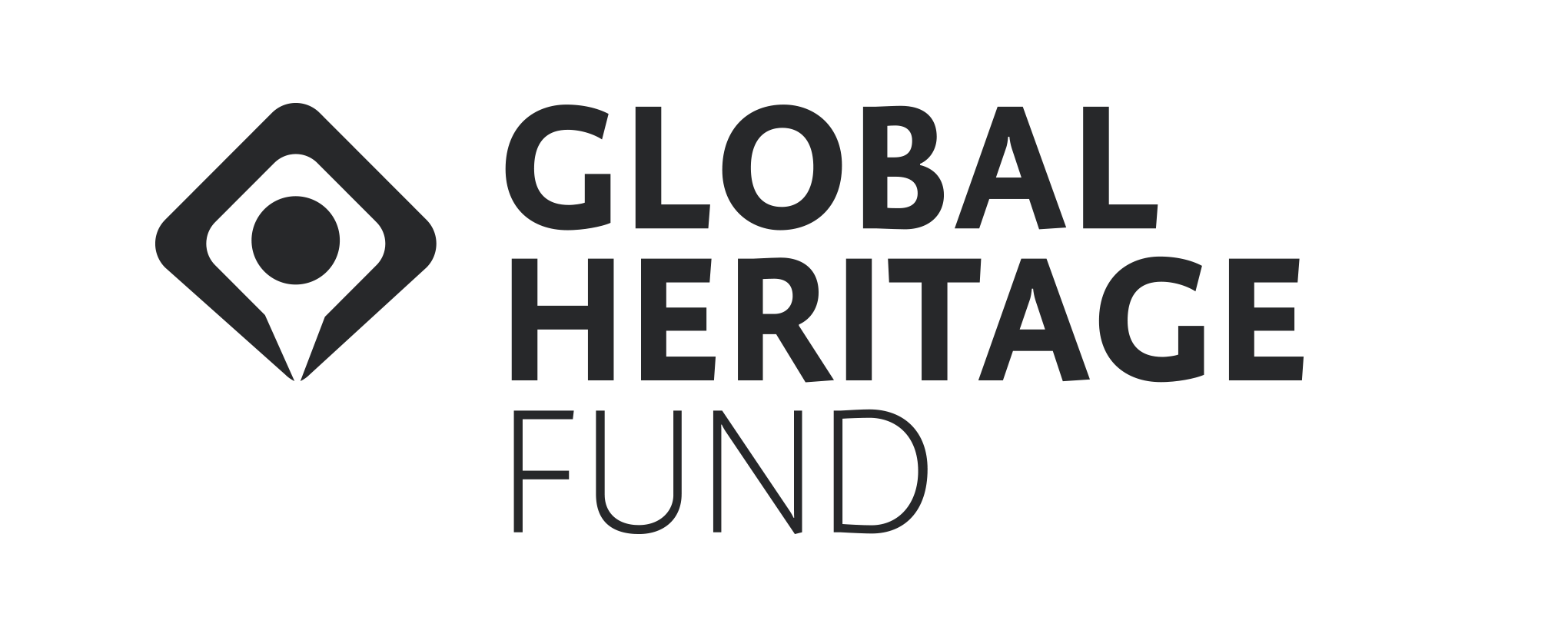
- Founded: 2002; 24 years ago
- Type: Nonprofit
- Headquarters: San Francisco, California
- Region served: Worldwide
- Key people: Nada Hosking (Executive Director)
- Website: globalheritagefund.org

In 2023, Global Heritage Fund and World Monuments Fund announced a Strategic Affiliation. The affiliation aims to create a more resilient, inclusive, and sustainable future for cultural heritage protection worldwide. GHF’s two active projects, Dali Dong Village in Guizhou, China, and La Ciudad Perdida in Colombia, joined WMF’s project portfolio.

== Global Heritage Fund founding ==
Founded in California in 2002, its mission is to "transform local communities by investing in global heritage."

To date, it has partnered with over 100 public and private organizations at 28 sites across 19 countries, investing over $30 million and securing $25 million in co-funding to carry out heritage preservation and socio-economic development.

== Global Heritage Fund projects ==
Projects are selected by Global Heritage Fund's Senior Advisory Board. Global Heritage Fund states that selection is based on a number of factors, including cultural significance of site, need of country or region in question, and high potential for sustainable preservation through community involvement.

=== Projects ===
Global Heritage Fund has current or past projects in the following locations:

- Amer Fort*, India
- Amtoudi, Morocco
- Ayios Vasileios, Greece
- Banteay Chhmar, Cambodia
- Çatalhöyük, Turkey
- Chavín de Huántar*, Peru
- La Ciudad Perdida, Colombia
- Collective Granaries, Morocco
- Cyrene*, Libya
- Daia, Romania
- Dali Dong Village, Guizhou, China
- Foguang Temple*, China
- Göbekli Tepe*, Turkey
- Hampi*, India
- Izborsk, Russia
- Kars, Turkey
- Lijiang*, China
- Maijishan, China
- Mirador, Guatemala
- My Son*, Vietnam
- Patan Durbar*, Nepal
- Pingyao*, China
- Sagalassos, Turkey
- Wat Phu*, Laos

(* indicates a UNESCO World Heritage Site)

== Global Heritage Fund UK ==
Global Heritage Fund registered as a charity in England and Wales in 2006, extending Global Heritage Fund's network of members, staff, and technical experts throughout the United Kingdom and Europe. Global Heritage Fund UK shares the Global Heritage Fund mission to transform local communities by investing in global heritage.

Global Heritage Fund UK Board of Trustees members include Patrick Franco, James Hooper, Nada Hosking, and Princess Alia Al-Senussi.

Prince Richard, Duke of Gloucester, KG, GCVO is the Royal Patron of Global Heritage Fund and Global Heritage Fund UK.

== Global Heritage Fund Asia ==
Based in Hong Kong, Global Heritage Fund Asia shares the Global Heritage Fund mission to transform local communities by investing in global heritage. Global Heritage Fund Asia Board of Directors members include Angus Forsyth, Nada Hosking, and Daniel K. Thorne.

== Recent initiatives ==
=== AMAL in Heritage ===
Global Heritage Fund developed AMAL in Heritage in partnership with ICOMOS-ICORP, ICCROM, and other conservation institutions to document site-specific risk in the cultural heritage sector by providing state of the art tools for preparedness, response, and recovery. The AMAL in Heritage mobile app launched in August 2017.

By monitoring sites before and in the immediate aftermath of a disaster, AMAL preserves crucial information that can be used to repair or reconstruct historic structures. The user-friendly technology also supports locals around heritage sites where access to expertise is challenging.

In the wake of the August 2020 port explosion in Lebanon, Global Heritage Fund launched a campaign to deliver AMAL in Heritage to the people of Beirut in partnership with the Lebanese Department of Antiquities (DGA). A local team recorded and assessed over 200 buildings in two days using the AMAL toolkit. This information was passed to a copy of Oxford University’s Endangered Archaeology in the Middle East and North Africa (EAMENA) Project that is specific to Lebanon and managed by the DGA.

=== Global Heritage Network ===
In 2010, Global Heritage Fund launched Global Heritage Network (GHN), an early warning and threats monitoring system that uses satellite imaging technology and ground reporting to enable international experts and local conservation leaders to clearly identify and solve imminent threats within the legal core and protected areas of each site.

=== Saving Our Vanishing Heritage ===
In October 2010, Global Heritage Fund produced a report titled Saving Our Vanishing Heritage: Safeguarding Endangered Cultural Heritage Sites in the Developing World. The report listed 500 major archaeological and heritage sites in developing countries, evaluating their current loss and destruction, conservation and development. It identified nearly 200 of these sites as "At Risk” or “Under Threat,” and 12 as “On the Verge” of irreparable loss and destruction. The Vanishing report stated that there were five accelerating man-made threats facing global heritage sites in developing countries: development pressures, unsustainable tourism, insufficient management, looting, and war and conflict.

== Strategic Affiliation with World Monuments Fund ==
In 2023, Global Heritage Fund and World Monuments Fund announced a Strategic Affiliation. The affiliation aims to create a more resilient, inclusive, and sustainable future for cultural heritage protection worldwide. GHF’s two active projects, Dali Dong Village in Guizhou, China, and La Ciudad Perdida in Colombia, joined WMF’s project portfolio.

== Partners ==
Global Heritage Fund has worked with over one hundred partners worldwide, including local community boards, NGOs, private sector companies, and local and national governmental bodies. Global Heritage Fund partners include Google Arts & Culture, American Express, Intrepid Foundation (the not-for-profit entity of Intrepid Travel), the A.G. Leventis Foundation, Grow Annenberg, and the J.M. Kaplan Fund.
