= Sadhak Bamakhyapa =

2026 Bengali biographical film

- Theatrical release poster
- Directed by: Sayantan Ghosal
- Written by: Sabyasachi Chowdhury
- Screenplay by: Sabyasachi Chowdhury
- Story by: Sabyasachi Chowdhury
- Based on: Life of Bamakhepa
- Produced by: Shrikant Mohta; Mahendra Soni
- Starring: Sabyasachi Chowdhury; Payel De; Saheb Chatterjee
- Cinematography: Soumik Halder
- Edited by: Subhajit Singha
- Music by: Indraadip Dasgupta
- Production company: SVF Entertainment
- Distributed by: PVR Inox Pictures
- Release date: 20 November 2026
- Running time: 195 minutes
- Country: India
- Language: Bengali

Sadhak Bamakhyapa is a 2026 Indian Bengali-language epic biographical devotional film directed by Sayantan Ghosal and produced by Shrikant Mohta and Mahendra Soni under the banner of SVF Entertainment. It is based on the story of Bamakhepa, a 19th-century saint known for his devotion to the goddess Tara at Tarapith. It stars Sabyasachi Chowdhury in the title role, along with Saheb Chatterjee and Payel De in lead roles.

== Cast ==
- Sabyasachi Chowdhury as Bamakhyapa / Sadhak Bamacharan Chattopadhyay
- Payel De as Maa Tara
- Saheb Chatterjee as Bamakhyapa's father
- Shankadeep Banerjee
- Monalisa Chattopadhyay

== Production ==
=== Development ===
The film was announced by SVF Entertainment, produced by Shrikant Mohta and Mahendra Soni. Sabyasachi Chowdhury was credited as writer, dialogue writer and creative director of the film. In an interview with Variety India, Chowdhury said he had been working on the script since August 2024. He was interested in the increasing success of the devotional genre and the opportunity to "bring a larger-than-life feeling in the theatres".

Sayantan Ghosal, the director of the film had wanted to portray Tarapith's reality on the big screen. Chowdhury, who appeared as Bamakhyapa in TV series Mahapeeth Tarapeeth, said that this film was different from the show as it "reduced the journey of the saint from his teens to old age". The muharat was conducted in the first week of July 2025.

=== Filming ===
Principal photography started in late July 2025. The film was shot for a total of five and a half months, with a week of delays due to rain that resulted in damage to sets and outdoor locations. The director of photography was Soumik Halder, and the editing was done by Subhajit Singha. Chowdhury gained 20 kg for his role at various ages.

== Music ==
Indraadip Dasgupta composed the music for the film. The soundtrack features a few tracks of bengali devotional music The song "Ami Mantra Tantra Kichhui Janine Ma" was released on 3 November 2026 and four songs from the soundtrack were released before the film by singers Manomay Bhattacharya, Jayati Chakraborty and Atanu Mishra.

== Release ==
=== Theatrical ===
Sadhak Bamakhyapa was initially scheduled for release on 6 November 2026, during Diwali, but was postponed to 20 November 2026 to avoid a box-office clash with Ramayana: Rise of a Legend. Trade sources said the change was to make certain the film got the most screens and optimum show timings.

On 19 November 2026, a special premiere was held at Geetanjali Cinema in Bolpur, near Tarapith. The makers chose Bolpur over Kolkata for its special screening to pay tribute to Bamakhyapa's birthplace in Birbhum and to reach out to the film's core audience in the districts. It was the first new release to premiere at the theatre after 25 years, since Sathi in 2001.

=== Marketing ===
The film's team organised an evening of Shyama Sangeet at Lake Kalibari in Kolkata on 4 November 2026. A trailer launch was held at Tarapith Mahashamshan on 14 November 2026. Chowdhury and De visited Thanthania Kalibari in Kolkata to promote the film on 26 October 2026.

== Reception ==
Ahead of the release, Dainik Statesman stated that Bengali viewers embraced Bamakhyapa's story as much as the rest of the country anticipated Ramayana.

== Controversy ==
On November 7, 2026, a scene from the film leaked on social media where Chowdhury was seen playing the part of Bamakhyapa in a red dress, with a bowl of payesh in his hand, and chatting with Maa Tara in the temple. Chowdhury, who said he was shocked by the leak and claimed he was not on social media, and the cast and crew were trying to figure out what had happened. He expressed that the scene was not significant and there were more intense scenes in the film. The scene's release led to a few netizens speculating about a promo, however, the producers did not comment.
