= Tarapith Rath Yatra =

- Type: Hindu religious festival
- Observed by: Hindus in West Bengal
- Date (2026): July 16
- Frequency: Annual
- Significance: Chariot procession of Goddess Tara
- Related to: Rath Yatra, Tarapith, Shaktism

Tarapith Rath Yatra (Bengali: তারাপীঠ রথযাত্রা) is a Hindu religious festival observed annually at the Tarapith temple in Birbhum district, West Bengal, India. It is held on the same day as the Rath Yatra in Puri, usually in the Hindu month of Ashadha (June–July). On this day, the idol of Tara Devi is placed on a chariot and pulled in a procession around The Tarapith Mandir.

Tara
- Compassion, Destruction, Protection, Tantric Liberation
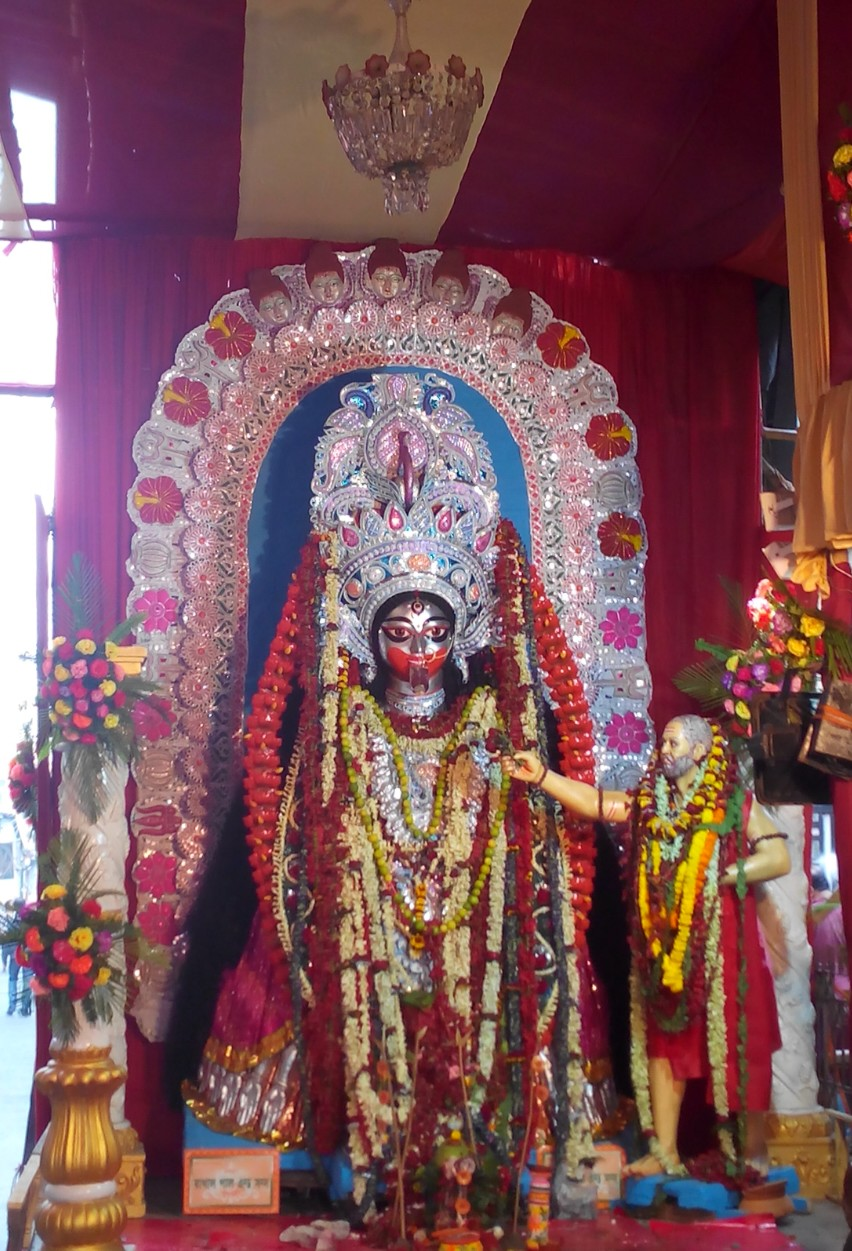
- Goddess Tārā with Bāmakṣepa at Poush Kālī Puja, Kolkata
- Affiliation: Mahavidya, Devi, Shaktism
- Abode: Cremation ground Shmashana
- Mantra: Oṃ Tārāyai Namaḥ
- Mount: Corpse (Shava)
- Texts: Tara Tantra, Rudrayamala, Devi Bhagavata Purana
- Festivals: Kali Puja,Kaushiki Amavasya, Navaratri
- Consort: Tārakeshwar (regional belief)

== Overview ==
Tarapith is a Shakta pitha and one of the most important centers of Shakta worship in Bengal. The temple is dedicated to Goddess Tara. The Rath Yatra at Tarapith is an adaptation of the Puri Rath Yatra, and it marks a major religious occasion for devotees from Bengal and neighboring states. In Shakta philosophy, Jagannath is considered same as Kali. This shows the harmony between Vaishnavas and Shaktas.

== History ==
The exact origins of the Tarapith Rath Yatra are not clearly documented. However, according to local tradition and oral histories, the ritual may have begun over 200 years ago, possibly under the guidance of early tantric practitioners like Sadhak Anandanath. The temple became even more popular during the time of Bamakhepa, a renowned 19th-century saint who practiced tantra in Tarapith.

== Rituals ==
The Rath Yatra at Tarapith is marked by a series of traditional Shakta rituals centred on the ceremonial procession of Goddess Tara. Unlike the conventional Rath Yatra observed at Puri, the principal deity carried on the chariot at Tarapith is Goddess Tara herself. According to temple traditions, the festival provides devotees with an opportunity to receive darshan of the goddess outside the sanctum sanctorum. Preparations for the procession include special worship of the goddess. Maa Tara is traditionally dressed in a Banarasi sari and adorned in her royal attire (''Rajbesha''). The ceremonial decoration includes garlands of flowers such as hibiscus (''Jaba''), aparajita, rajnigandha and karabi, along with leaves of the deodar tree associated with the temple's cremation-ground surroundings, and jewelry (gahana). Shringar arati is performed before the goddess is offered ''bhoga'', traditionally including flattened rice (''chire''), five varieties of sweets and fruits. A special worship ceremony follows before the deity is taken out of the sanctum.

== Public Participation ==
Devotees from across Bengal, Jharkhand, and Bihar visit Tarapith during the Rath Yatra. Local stalls sell flowers, sweets, and devotional items. Volunteers help manage the crowd, and the local administration often arranges for security and health services.

The day is marked by the distribution of prasad usually sweets, fruits, and puffed rice. Devotees consider this food sacred and believe it carries blessings from the goddess.

== Media Coverage ==
The Tarapith Rath Yatra receives regional media attention every year. Bengali news channel ABP Ananda reported in 2025 that the festival took place on June 27, with large crowds and full ceremonial observance.

News reports also showed that devotees chanted "জয় মা তারা!" while the chariot was being pulled around the temple. Temple authorities confirmed that the event was carried out with full traditional rituals under security arrangements.

According to Sangbad Pratidin, devotees waited in long queues from early morning to get a glimpse of Maa Tara on the rath. Many offered red hibiscus flowers, sweets, and sindoor as part of their vows.

== Significance ==
While it is smaller in scale compared to the Puri Rath Yatra, the Tarapith version holds deep emotional and religious importance for the Shakta community. The act of pulling the goddess’s chariot is considered an opportunity to receive direct blessings. Many consider it an especially auspicious day to offer prayers, fulfill vows, and seek divine protection.

== Comparison with Puri Rath Yatra ==
Unlike the Puri Rath Yatra involves multiple chariots and a journey to the Gundicha Temple, the Tarapith Rath Yatra is more symbolic. It features only the main idol of Maa Tara and is limited to a circumambulation of the temple premises. However, both share the common idea of bringing the deity outside the sanctum to bless the general public.

== See also ==
- Tarapith
- Rath Yatra
- Bamakhepa
- Shakta pithas
- Jagannath
- Shaktism
