= Tarapith temple =

Hindu temple dedicated to goddess Tara at Tarapith, India

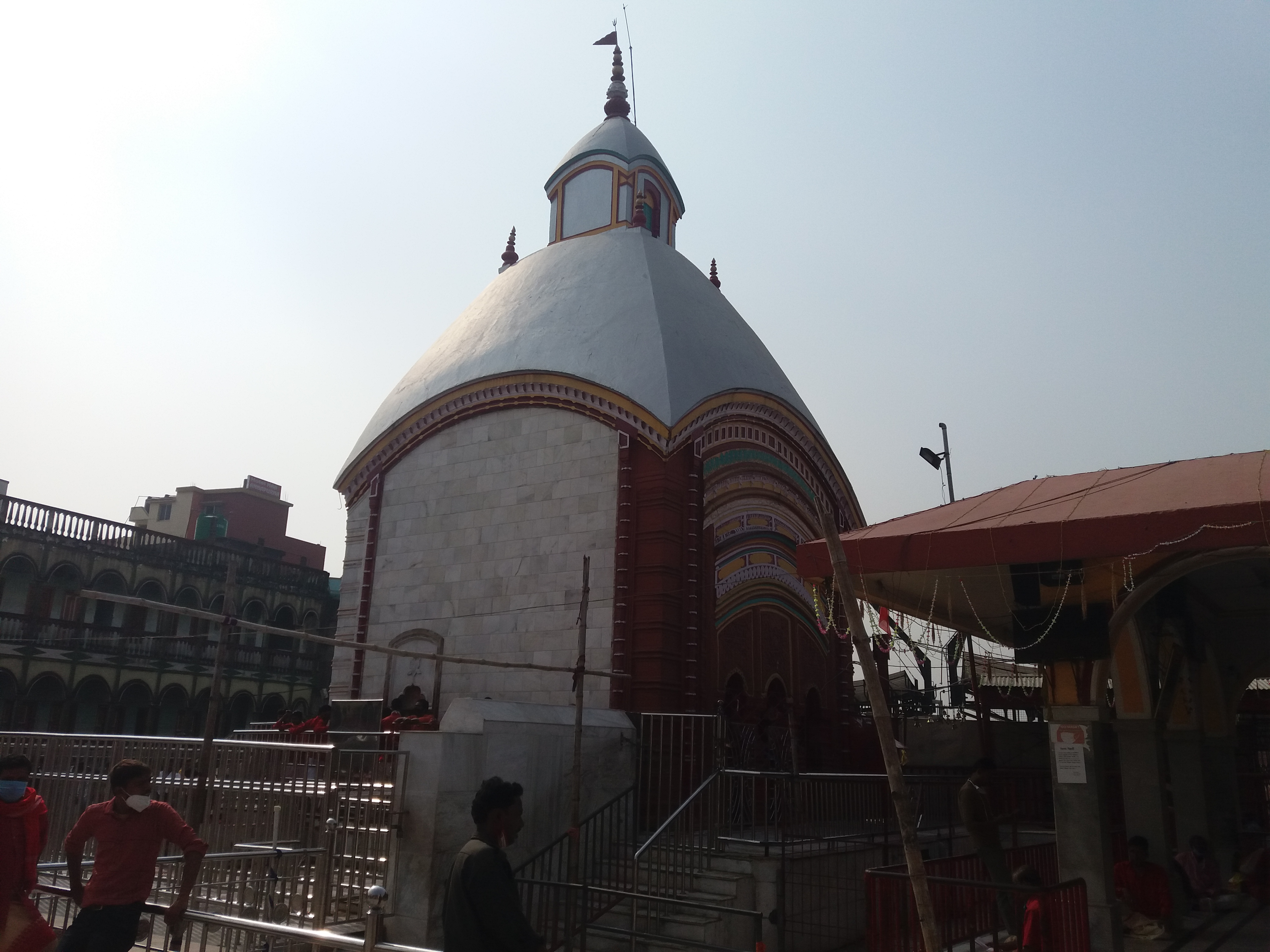
- View of the Tarapith temple

- West Bengal

Religion
- Affiliation: Hinduism
- Deity: Maa Tara: Tara Puja; Kali Puja; Durga Puja; Ambubachi; Kaushiki Amavasya; Phalaharini Amavasya
- Governing body: Tarapith Rampurhat Development Authority

Location
- Location: Tarapith
- State: West Bengal
- Country: India
- Coordinates: 24.1133183°N 87.7969825°E

Architecture
- Type: Chala Style of Bengal architecture

Website
- tarapith.in

Tarapith temple (Bengali pronunciation: [tarapiʈʰ mondir]), is a Hindu temple in Tarapith, Birbhum, West Bengal in India, dedicated to the Hindu goddess Tara, the second of the ten Mahavidyas in Hinduism. It is recognised as both a Shakta pitha and Siddhapith, and has long been regarded as one of the most prominent and historically significant centres of Tantra and Shakti worship.

According to the Devi Bhagavata Purana, Kalika Purana, Markandeya Purana and the Shakta pitha Stotram, the third eye of Goddess Sati fell here, after Vishnu's Sudarshan Chakra splintered her body into many parts to calm down Mahadev's rage, during his cosmic dance. Vashishta Muni, who first saw it, started worshipping there and the place was later developed into a temple. In addition to the temple, Tarapith is closely associated with the mystic saint Bamakhepa, who is said to have had deep spiritual experiences in this area. The cremation ground accompanying the temple is one of the most revered and popular sites for tantric practices in Shaktism.

== Geography ==
Tarapith temple is situated near the Dwaraka river in the serene village landscape of Rampurhat-II Tehsil. Emerged in a spiritual and crowded atmosphere, the temple attracts millions of pilgrims every year. The nearest railway station is Rampurhat Railway Station while the nearest bus stop is the Tarapith Bus Stop. The Netaji Subhash Chandra Bose International Airport is its nearest airport.

== Legend and importance ==
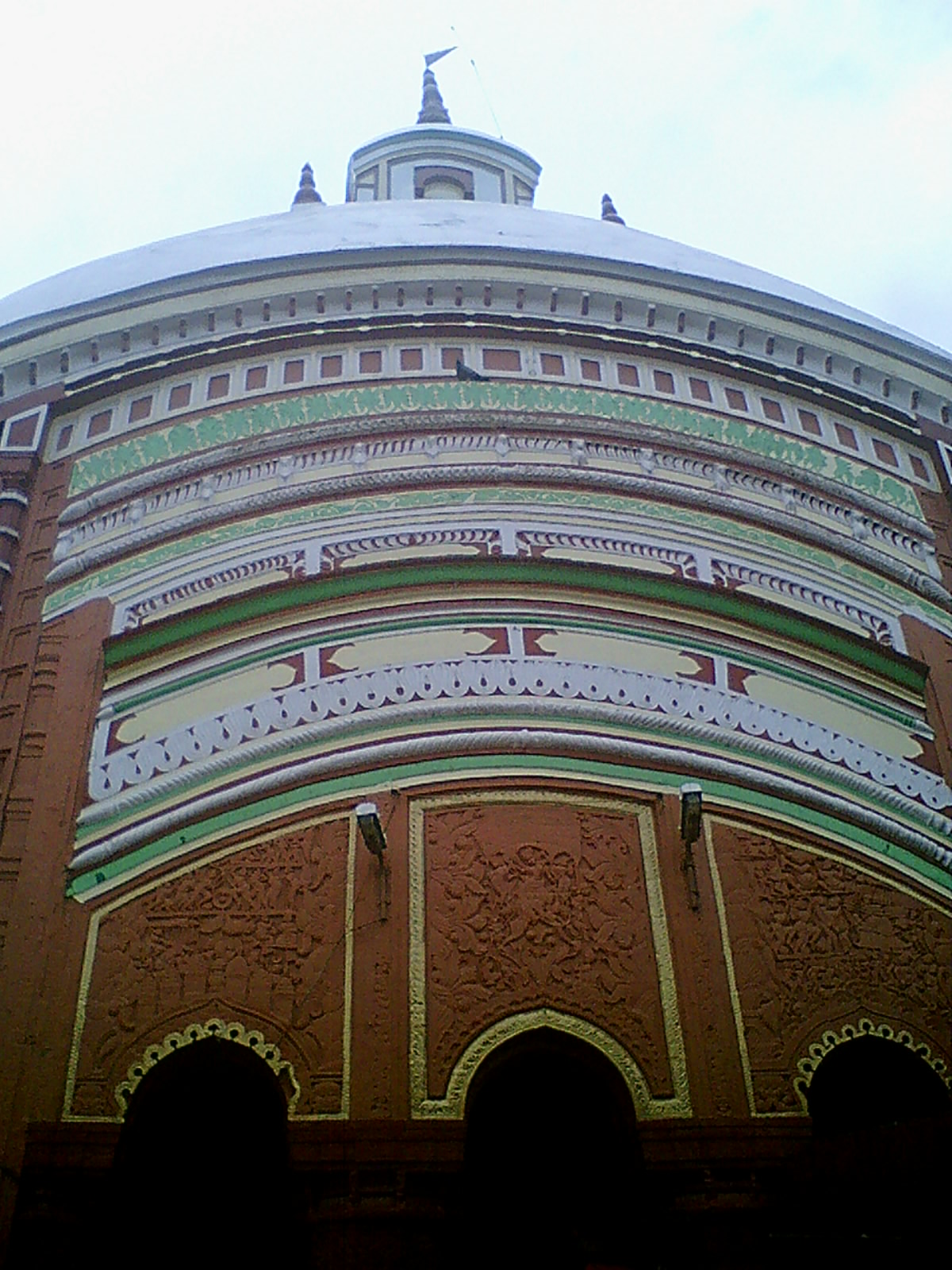
The temple of Tarapith

There are several legends narrated on the origin and importance of Tarapith and the temple, all related to the goddess Tara deified in the Tarapith temple.

A well-known legend relates to the Shakta pithas. Sati, Shiva's counterpart, felt insulted when her father Daksha deliberately did not invite Shiva to the great yajña "the fire sacrifice" he organized. Despite Shiva's refusal citing that they're not invited, when Sati however arrived to the place, Daksha insulted Shiva by saying cuss words for him in front of all the attendants. Unable to bear this humiliation of her husband, Sati gave up her life by jumping into the yajña fire. Infuriated by this tragic turn of events, Shiva went wild. Then, Vishnu, in order to pacify Shiva, decimated the body of Sati with his chakram. Sati's body part fell all over the Indian subcontinent. The places where the body parts fell have become centres of worship of the Goddess in different manifestations. There are 51 such holy temples which are called Shakta pithas. In West Bengal, there are many such piths such as the Kalighat.

Vashistha had seen this form and worshipped the goddess Sati in the form of Tara. Another legend describes the following: Shiva had drunk the poison that had emerged by the churning of the cosmic oceans, to save the universe. To relieve the intense burning in his throat, Sati – in the form of Tara – breast fed Shiva to relieve him of the effect of poison in his throat. Another local narration is that Vasishtha chose this place for the worship of Sati as it was already known as a Tarapith. Among piths, Tarapith is a siddha pith, which grants enlightenment, wisdom, happiness and siddhis ("supernatural powers").

Another oral legend about the temple states that the sage Vashishtha practised austerities toward Tara, but was unsuccessful, so on the advice of a divine voice, he went to meet the Buddha – an avatar of Vishnu according to some schools of Hinduism – in Tibet. The Buddha instructed Vasishtha to worship Tara through the practices of vamachara. During this time, Buddha had a vision of Tarapith as an ideal location for a temple that would serve to enshrine the image of Tara. Buddha advised Vasishtha to go to Tarapith, the abode of Tara. At Tarapith, Vasishtha performed penance by reciting Tara mantra 300,000 times. Tara was pleased with Vasishtha's penance and appeared before him. Vasishtha appealed to Tara to appear before him in the form of a mother suckling Shiva on her breast, the form that Buddha had seen in his divine vision. Tara then incarnated herself in that form before Vasishtha and turned into a stone image. Since then Tara is worshipped in the Tarapith temple in the form of a mother suckling Shiva on her breast.

Tarapith, Kalighat and Nabadwip are considered among the most important tirthas (holy places with a sacred water body) for Bengali Hindus.

== The shrine as a Sidhha Pith - Tarapith ==
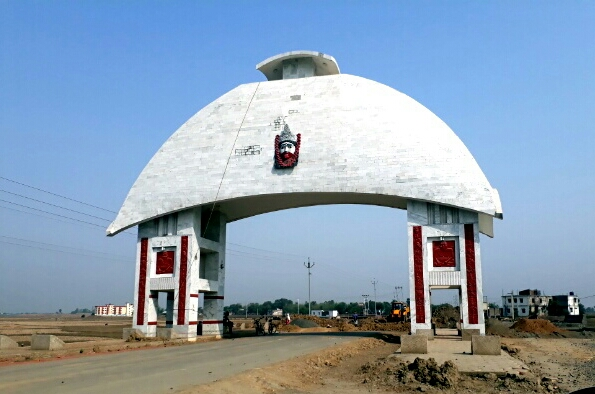
Gateway of Tarapith

The shrine gets its name being a Sidhha Pith - Sidhha Pith holy temple of Tara Maa. They are believed to have originated due to the falling of body parts of the corpse of Sati Devi, when Shiva carried it and wandered in sorrow. There are 51 Shakta Pithas all over South Asia is linked to the 51 letters in Sanskrit. The Shakta pithas are associated with the mythology of Daksha yaga and Sati's self immolation. These shrines are important place of worship for Tantra practitioners.

== Maa Tara and the rituals ==
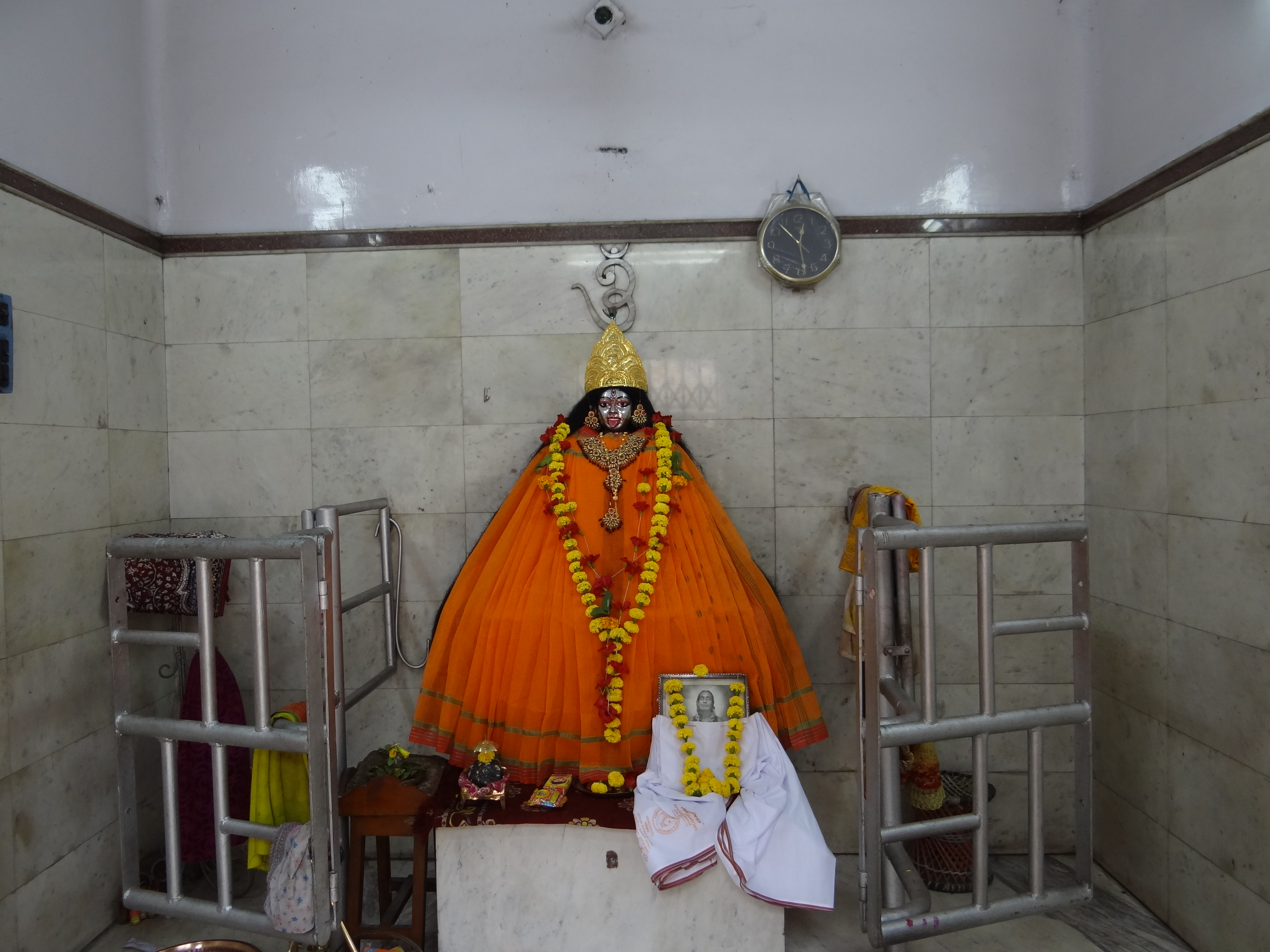
Maa Mundamalini at Mundamalini temple in Tarapith

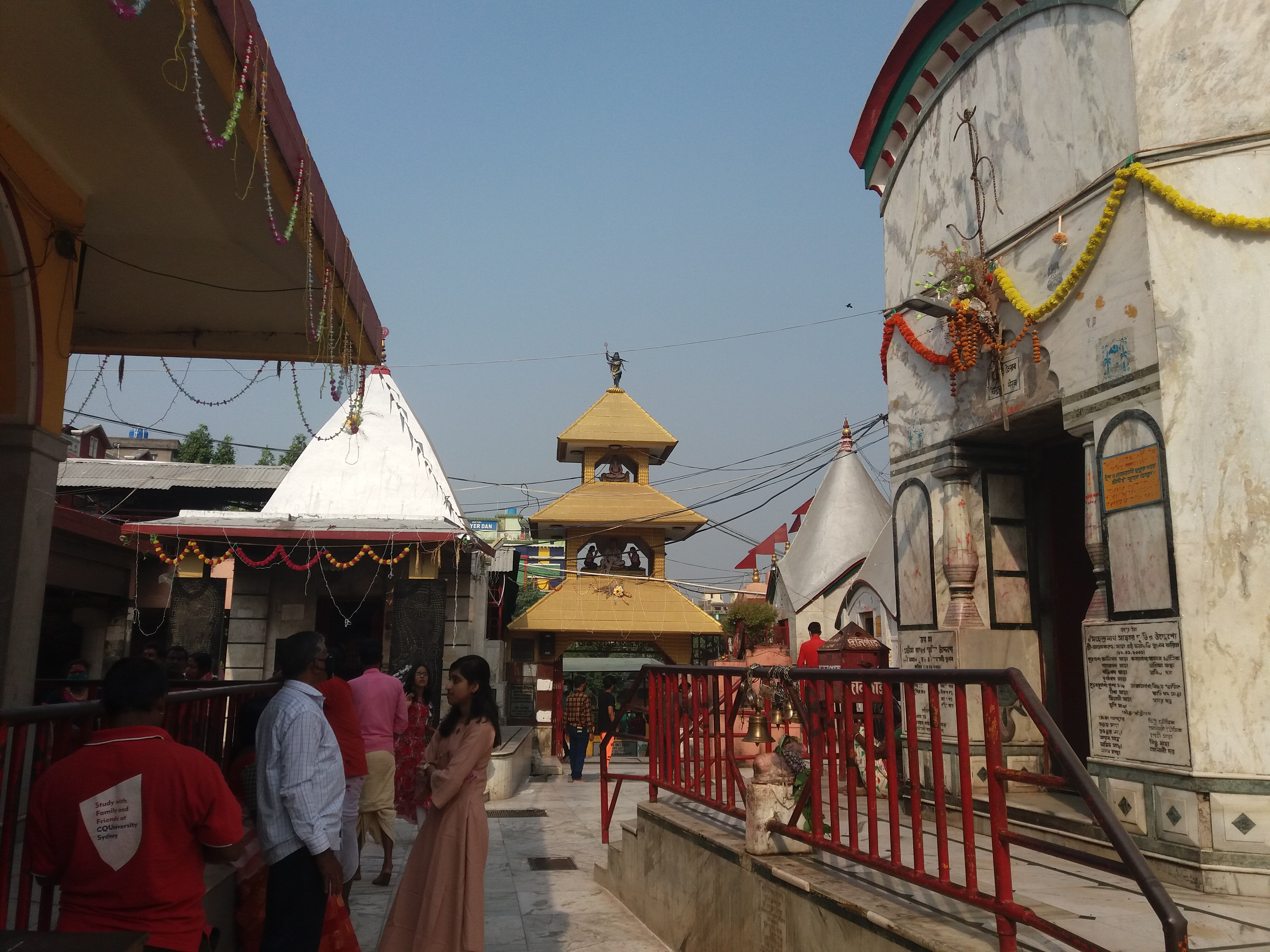
Inside the temple complex

The Tara temple in Tarapith is a medium-sized temple in the rural precincts of Bengal. Its fame as a pilgrimage centre with the deity of Tara enshrined in it.

The temple base is thick with thick walls, built of red brick. The superstructure has covered passages with many arches raising to the pinnacle with a spire (shikara). The image of the deity is enshrined under the eaves in the sanctum. There are two Tara images in the sanctum. The stone image of Tara depicted as a mother suckling Shiva – the "primordial image" (seen in the inset of the fierce form of the image of Tara) is camouflaged by a three feet metal image, that the devotees normally see. It represents Tara in her fiery form with four arms, wearing a garland of skulls and a protruding tongue. Crowned with a silver crown and with flowing hair, the outer image wrapped in a sari and decked in marigold garlands with a silver umbrella over its head. The forehead of the metal image is adorned with red kumkum (vermilion). Priests take a speck of this kumkum and apply it on the foreheads of the devotees as a mark of Tara's blessings. The devotees offer coconuts, bananas and silk saris, and some devotees unusually offer bottles of whisky. The primordial image of Tara has been described as a "dramatic Hindu image of Tara's gentler aspect".

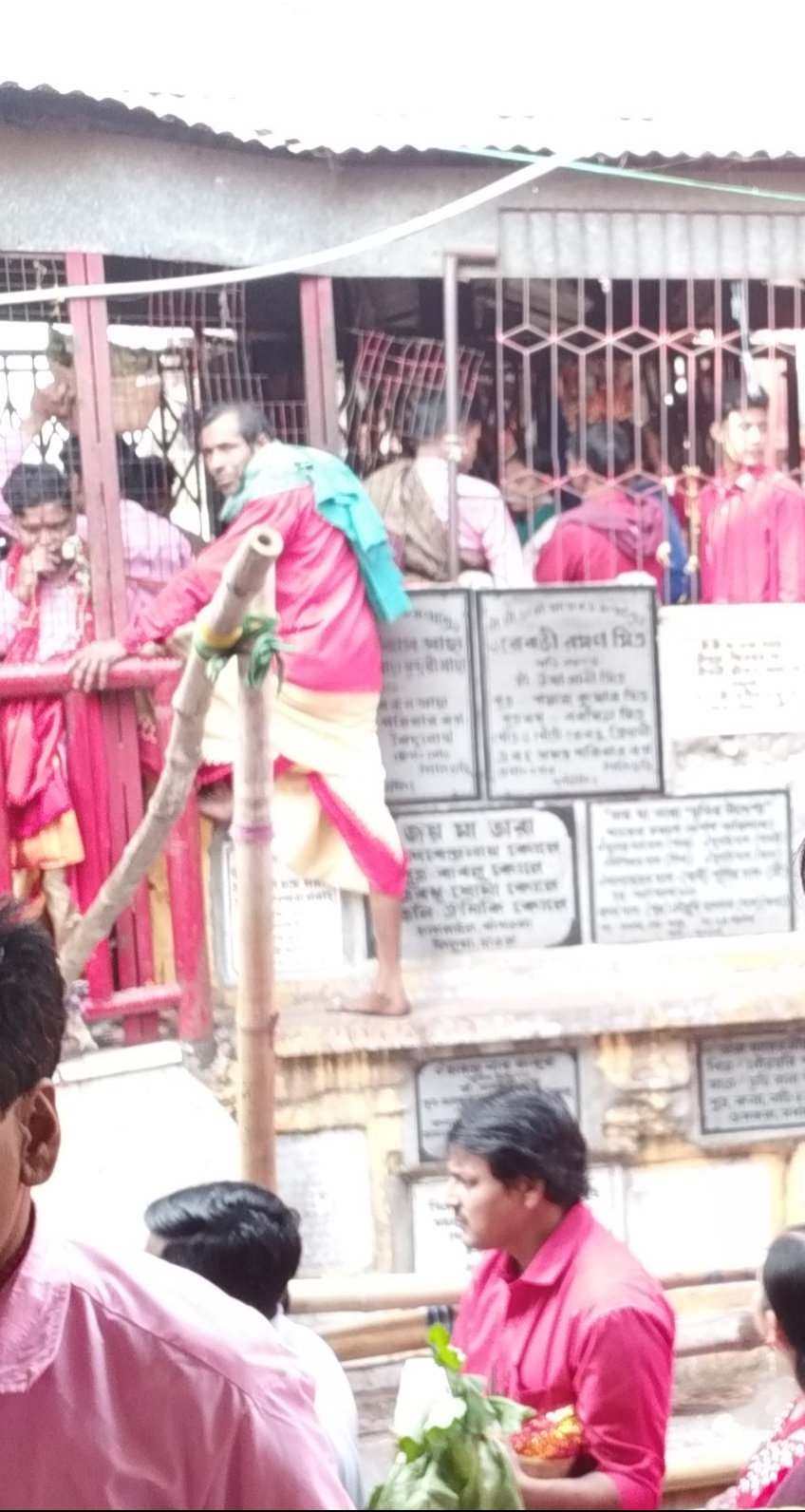
Devotees at the Tarapith temple in Birbhum

The priests of the temple offer puja (worship) with great reverence, in order to reveal her motherly aspect to the devotees. Their worship blends the fierce North Indian depiction of the Sati myth of the goddess with the peaceful motherly visionary form of Tara, as seen by Buddha and his disciple Vasishtha of the Tantric tradition – the Buddhist Tara form. At Tarapith, though the softer motherly aspect of the fierce goddess is emphasized. The chanting of hymns or stotrams in her praise is also a part of the devotional appeal made to the goddess.

The devotees take a holy bath at the sacred tank (Jivita Kunda) adjacent to the temple before entering the temple premises to offer worship and even after the worship. The waters of the tank is said to have healing powers and even restore life to the dead.

Blood sacrifice of goats is the daily norm in the temple. Devotees who offer such goat sacrifices seek blessings from the deity. They bathe the goats in the holy tank near the temple before the sacrifice. They also purify themselves by taking bath in the holy tank before offering worship to the deity. The goat is then tethered to a stake, the designated post in a sand pit, and the neck of the goat butchered with a single stroke by a special sword. A small quantity of the blood of the goat is then collected in a vessel and offered to the deity in the temple. The devotees also smear their forehead with a bit of blood from the pit, as a mark of reverence to the deity.

== Prasad ==
Tarapith is one of the few temples in India where non-veg food is served as the prasad. As per the age-old rituals, Tarapith has been a Tantric temple, where goat sacrifices are performed to seek blessings of the goddess. Goat meat (mutton) and shol maach are the two most indispensable part of the bhog served. On special events like Kaushiki Amavasya, Phalaharini Amavasya and Ambubachi, special bhog is served. It includes rice, fried rice, pulao, moong dal, five types of fried vegetables, five types of curries, slaughtered mutton, shol maach pora, maach bhaja, five types of sweets and payesh.

== The temple complex ==
The temple complex houses four other temples beside the main temple which is dedicated to Maa Tara. There is the "Chandrachur Shiv temple" dedicated to Shiva, "Bajrangbali temple" dedicated to Hanuman and "Maa Shashthi temple" dedicated to Maa Shashthi. There is also "Bamakhyapa temple" in respect of Bamakhyapa, which was made at the place where he was cremated.

== Spiritual tourism ==
Tarapith is one of the prime centres for spiritual tourism in West Bengal as well as Eastern India. With an average of 12000 devotees daily and 7 million devotees annually visiting the Tarapith, the economy of the town thrives around it. Besides the Tarapith temple, the ISCKON temple, Jagannath temple, Nalateshwari temple and Akalipur Kali temple also draws large number of tourists. The place is also visited being the birth place of preachers like "Bamakhepa" and "Nityananda Thakur".

In 2023, the state government got permission from Ministry of Environment, Forest and Climate Change to build replicas of the 51 sati peeths in Tarapith, close to the Tarapith temple on 14,682 hectares of land. Although Mamata Banerjee sanctioned the project in 2017, it was delayed due to the late sanctioning from the central government. It will benefit the common people who will be able to visit all the sati peeths at one place, which would have been otherwise not possible for them due to economic reasons. Also expected to boost the spiritual tourism in Tarapith, the state government tourism department has sanctioned ₹2 crore funds for the mega project. Mamata Banerjee has announced another project "Tarabitan", which will include 21 cottages made over 7 acres of land, within 6–7 km of the temple. ₹5.16 crore have been invested in the project by the state government, which will also include a helipad, several restaurants, a parking plaza, a shopping complex and an auditorium.

== Renovation ==
In 2023, the temple was renovated over a period of 7 days, when the main temple was closed owing to less crowd of devotees for certain trains being cancelled for 20 days. It was done two years after CM Mamata Banerjee sanctioned ₹16.5 crore in 2021 for the temple renovation, in two phases of ₹10.5 crore and ₹6 crore. The renovations included the inner temple floor being marbled, inner walls painted, the "bedi" renovated and the outside walls repainted. The "bhog ghar" which could previously accommodate 1000 pilgrims was expanded to hold more pilgrims at a time. For that period, Maa Tara's idol was kept in the Shiva temple, located inside the temple complex. For that week, devotees were only allowed to see the deity and not enter inside, due to the small space inside the Shiva temple.

Barring the main temple, new temples were being constructed inside the temple complex in order to replace the four old temples, which were demolished later as they were in a fragile state. They temples rebuilt were the "Chandrachir Shiv temple", "Bajrangbali temple", "Maa Shashthi temple" and "Bamakhyapa temple".

After the renovations were completed and Maa Tara's idol was transferred back to the main, the temple committee generated a new set of rules which banned on the cracking of coconut on the floor and carrying vermillion or "alta" inside the "garbhagriha", in order to keep the floor and walls in proper condition for a longer time. The water passages of the garbhahriha were cleansed and AC was installed, as a token of devotion towards Maa Tara.

== Cremation ground ==
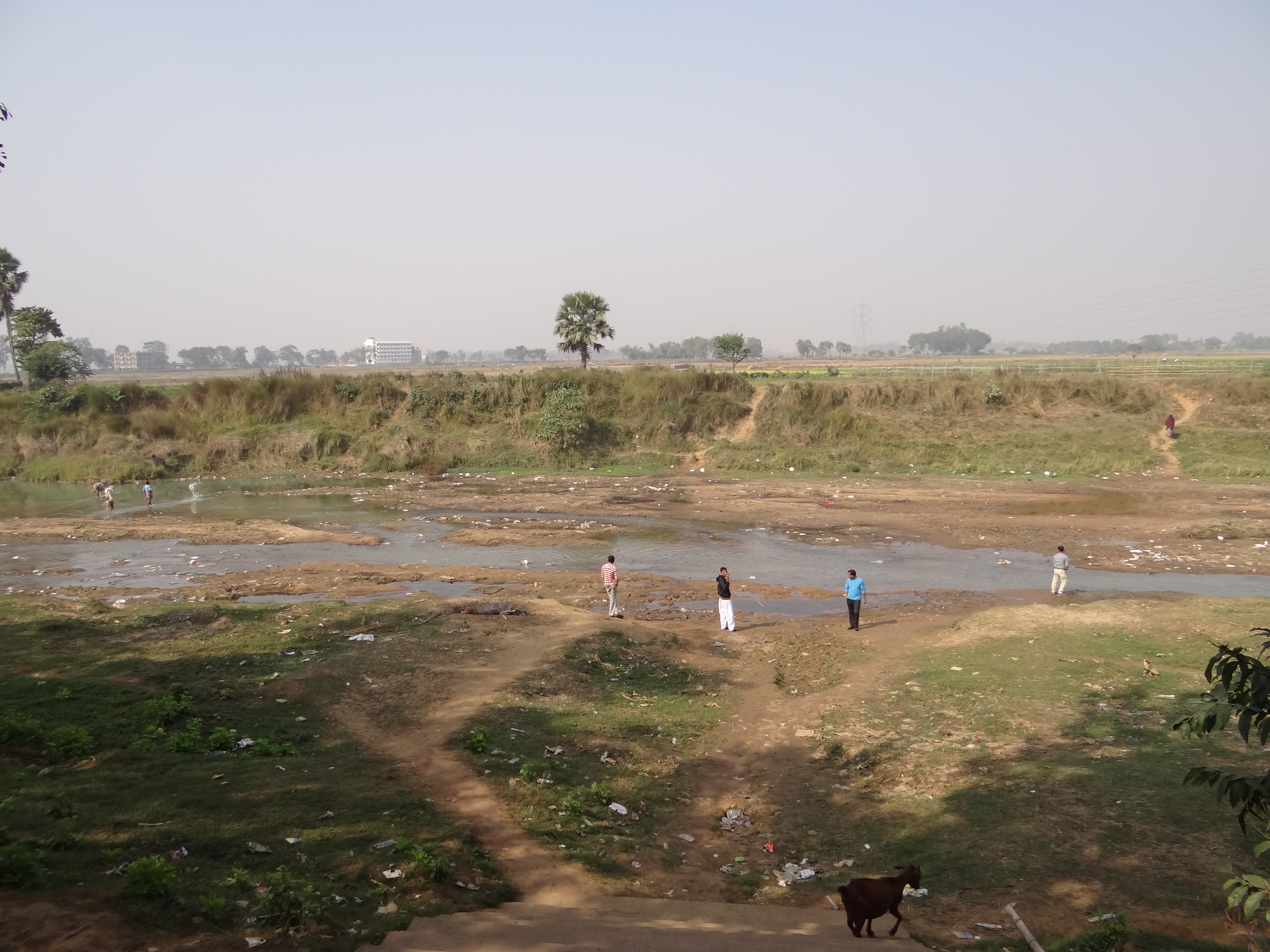
Cremation ground at Tarapith

The cremation ground (maha smasan), amidst dark forest surroundings, is located on the river side at the end of town limits, away from the village life and practices of the Bengali social order. In Bengal, the cremation ground of Tarapith is also considered integral to the Shakta pithas. It is believed that goddess Tara can be seen in shadows drinking blood of goats which are sacrificed every day at her altar, to satiate her anger and seek favours.

Tantric practitioners believe that Tara is attracted to bones and skeletons and the cremation ground is her preferred residence. Goddess Tara's iconographic depictions show her amidst cremation grounds. Tantric practitioners have, therefore, been flocking these grounds for generations for performing their Tantric sadhana (spiritual practice); many Sadhus permanently reside here. The cremation grounds are flowed by the "dread locked ash-smeared sadhus". Sadhus have built their hutments, amidst banyan trees and embellished their huts with red-painted skulls embedded into the mud walls. In addition, calendar pictures of Hindu goddesses, saints of Tarapith and a trishul (trident) decorated with marigold garlands and skulls at the entrance are a common sight in front of the huts. Human as well as animal skulls like those of jackals and vultures – which are unfit for Tantric rites – and snake skins decorate the huts. Good skulls used for tantric rituals and for drinking purpose by the Tantrics are cured before use; skulls of virgins and people who have committed suicide are said to be powerful.

== Bamakhepa ==
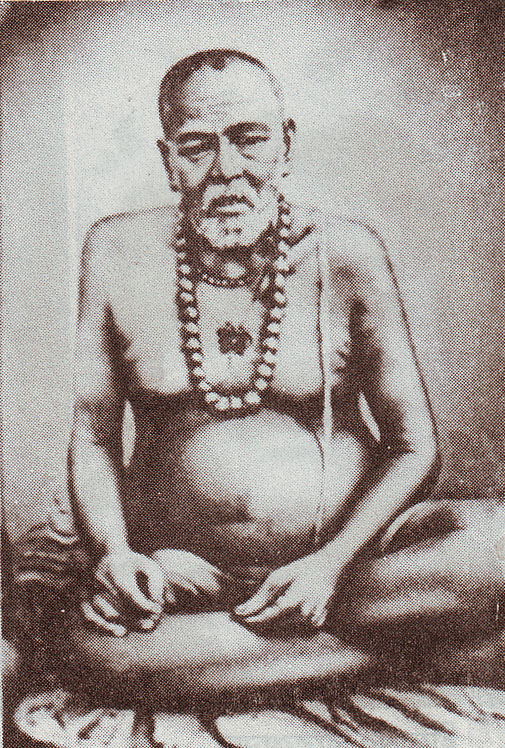
Bamakhepa, the tantric saint of Tarapith in the 19th century

A saint, held in great reverence in Tarapith and whose shrine is also located in the vicinity of the Tara temple, was Bamakhepa (1837–1911) popularly known as the "mad saint". Bama-khepa, literally means the mad ("khepa") follower of "left handed" ("Bama" or "Vama" in Sanskrit) path – the Tantric way of worship. Bamakhepa, goddess Tara's ardent devotee lived near the temple and meditated in the cremation grounds. He was a contemporary of another famous Bengali saint Ramakrishna. At a young age, he left his house and came under the tutelage of a saint named Kailsahpathi Baba, who lived in Tarapith. He perfected yoga and Tantric sadhana (worship), which resulted in his becoming the spiritual head of Tarapith. He also went to Devi Moulakhsi temple at Maluti village for worship. People came to him seeking blessings or cures for their illness, in distress or just to meet him. He did not follow the set rules of the temple and, as a result, was once assaulted by temple priests for having taken food meant as an offering for the deity.Tara Ma appeared in the dream of Maharani ("Queen") of Natore- Rani Annadasundari Devi and told her to feed the saint first as he was her son. After this incident, Bamakhepa was fed first in the temple before the deity and nobody obstructed him. It is believed that Tara gave a vision to Bamakhepa in the cremation grounds, in her ferocious form, before taking him to her breast.

== Bibliography ==
- Dalrymple, William (2009). Nine Lives. Bloomsbury Publishing Plc. pp. 203–233. ISBN 978-1-4088-0153-6.
- Kinsley, David R. (1997). Tantric visions of the divine feminine: the ten mahāvidyās. University of California Press. ISBN 978-0-520-20499-7.
