= Atla, Birbhum =

Coordinates: 24°07′N 87°46′E

Atla
- Village
- Location in West Bengal, India Atla (India)
- Country: India
- State: West Bengal
- District: Birbhum district

Population (2011)
  - Total: 3,398

Languages
  - Official: Bengali, English
- Time zone: UTC+5:30 (IST)
- Website: birbhum.gov.in

Atla is a village in Rampurhat I CD Block in Rampurhat subdivision of Birbhum district, West Bengal, India. It is famous for being the birthplace Bamakhepa, a saint of India.

== Education ==
According to the 2011 census, the literacy rate of Atla village was 72.62%, with male literacy at 79.90% and female literacy at 64.71 %. Recently Atla village came into news for efforts made by Mohanananda Brahmachari Charitable Foundation community centre with help from Haven Charity, UK, to impart Information Technology skills to students.
