= Amrita Chattopadhyay =

Indian film actress

- Born: Kolkata, West Bengal, India
- Occupation: Actress

Amrita Chattopadhayay is an Indian film and television actress. She debuted with Buddhadeb Dasgupta's film Anwar ka Ajab Kissa. After that, she has acted in a number of Bengali and Hindi films and web series, besides some multilingual international projects.

== Early life and education ==
Amrita did her schooling at Patha Bhavan Kolkata. She graduated from St. Xaviers in sociology (with honours) and did her post-graduation studies at Jadavpur University, scoring first class marks in both cases.

== Career ==
Filmmaker Buddhadeb Dasgupta's film Anwar ka Ajab Kissa marked her film debut. It did not release theatrically. She has acted in Bengali films as the protagonist, including Janla Diye Bou Palalo and Meher Ali.

== Filmography ==
Year	Film	Director	Character
2013	Anwar Ka Ajab Kissa	Buddhadeb Dasgupta	Nafisa
2014	Janla Diye Bou Palalo	Aniket Chattopadhyay	Mimi
2014	Kolkata Calling	Mainak Bhaumik	Pallavi
2015	Onnyo basanto	Aditi Roy	Tannistha
2015	Bhengchi	Krishanu Ganguly	Aleya
2015	Loadshedding	Soukarya Ghosal	Papiya (grown-up)
2015	Meher Aali	Arindam Dey	Riya
2018	III Smoking Barrels	Sanjib Dey	Morjina
2019	Tushagni	Rana Banerjee	Atreyee
2019	Ahaa Re	Ranjan Ghosh	Shahida
2021	Chabiwala: The Keysmith	Raja Ghosh	Fatima
2022	A Holy Conspiracy	Saibal Mitra	Reshmi Merry Mal
2023	Rohoshyomoy	Soumyaa Supriyo	Esha
2023	A Knock on the Door	Ranjan Palit	Ramona
2023	Mrs. Undercover	Anushree Mehta	Priyanka
2025	‘Bhuto’ Purbo	Kakoli Ghosh, Abhinab Mukhopadhyay	Manimalika
TBA	Mother	Teona Mitevska	Madam Kumar

== Web Series ==
Year	Series	OTT	Character	Director	Ref
	Kanakanjali				
2018	Byomkesh Season 3 "Shajarur Kanta"	Hoichoi	Deepa	Sayantan Ghosal	
	Teen Kanya				
2018	Laboratory	Hoichoi	Young Sohini	Soumik Chatterjee	
2019	Manbhanjan	Hoichoi	Lobongobala	Abhijit Chowdhury	
2019	Teen Cup Cha	Hoichoi	Unnamed Girl	Debaloy Bhattacharya	
2019	Bou Keno Psycho	Hoichoi	Konkal Kakoli	Debaloy Bhattacharya	
2020	Paanch Phoron Season 2	Hoichoi	Dipali	Chandril Bhattacharya	
2020	Damayanti Season 1	Hoichoi	Sharmistha	Aritra Sen Rohan Ghosh	
2020	JL50	Sony Liv	Shriparna	Shailender Vyas	
2021	Gangulys Wed Guhas	Klikk	Modhura	Samadarshi Dutta	
2023	Varanasi Junction	Klikk	Supriya Chowdhury	Riingo Banerjee	
2024	Inspector Nalinikanta Season 2	Klikk	Nandini	Soumik Chatterjee	
2024	DuggaDugga	Platform8	Anamika	Jiit Chakraborty	
2025	Sondhe Namar Pore	Darshoo	Mohar Lahiri		

== Awards and nominations ==
Award Show	Award name	Movies	Year	Result
BFJA	Best Debut Award- in films		2015	Won
Filmfare	Best Actor in a Supporting Role	A Holy Conspiracy	2023	Nominated
Telecine Awards	Best Actor in a Leading Role OTT	Varanasi Junction	2023	Won
TV9 Bangla Ghorer Bioscope	Best Actor in a Leading Role OTT	Varanasi Junction	2023	Nominated
