= Mahapeeth Tarapeeth =

Bengali mythological TV show

- Genre: Mythology; Drama
- Written by: Tapan Ganguly, Ritun Chatterjee
- Screenplay by: Writam Ghosal
- Story by: Writam Ghoshal
- Directed by: Subhendu Chakraborty
- Creative director: Nairwita Dutta
- Starring: Sabyasachi Chowdhury; Nabanita Das; Jeetu Kamal; Roosha Chatterjee; Goutam Halder; Sagnik Chakraborty
- Music by: Devjit Roy
- Country of origin: India
- Original language: Bengali
- No. of episodes: 781

Production
- Executive producers: Taniya, Sweta, Anwesha (Star Jalsha) Sayantanee, Darsana, Tanima, Pinky (Surinder Films)
- Producers: Surinder Singh; Nispal Singh
- Production locations: Dassani Film Studio, Tollygunge
- Cinematography: Biswajit Mitra
- Editors: Ankan Maity, Bikram
- Running time: 22–24 minutes

Original release
- Network: Star Jalsha
- Release: 4 February 2019 – 25 February 2022

Mahapeeth Tarapeeth was a Bengali mythological show that was aired on Star Jalsha and is also available on Disney+ Hotstar. The show narrates the origin of Tarapith shrine- the journey from fear to faith and chart the various phases of Maa Tara and Bamakhepa’s journey to fight against societal evils. This show was produced by Max Entertainment, Surinder Films.

== Plot ==
The show revolves around the manifestation of the unparalleled Tarapith, which according to legends is home to one of the 51 parts (Tara-eyeball) of Maa Sati. It depicts how the Tantric Hindu temple became the revered Shakti Peeth by regaling tales known and unknown that surround it.

Set in 19th century Bengal, the show narrates the journey of the omnipotent goddess’ origin and her miracles, her connection with her ardent devotee Bamakhepa and the obstacles they overcome to abolish malpractices and superstitions in tumultuous times.

== Cast ==
- Nabanita Das as Maa Tara / Devi Durga / Maa Kali / Devi Chhinnamasta
- Sabyasachi Chowdhury as Bamakhepa / Bama Charan Chattopadhyay / Sadhak Bamakhyapa / Bama / Bamdev
- Sarbik Pal as Child Bama
- Roosha Chatterjee as Rani Annada Sundari / Choto Rani Maa
- Jeetu Kamal as Anandanath Roy / Choto Kumar (deceased)
- Kushal Chakraborty as Sarbanandho Chotopadhay (Bama's father) (deceased)
- Aditi Chatterjee as Rajkumari (Bama's Mother) (Deceased)
- Sagnik Chatterjee as Borendronath Roy / Boro Kumar
- Mousumi Bhattacharya / Moyna Bandyopadhyay / Indrakshi Nag as Madhabilata / Boro Rani Maa
- Goutam Halder as Aghoreswar (Deceased)
- Riju Biswas as Birendranath Roy
- Dhrubojyoti Sarkar as Mahadev
- Jasmine Roy as Maa Durga
- Sayak Chakraborty as Lord Krishna
- Pradip Dhar as Morol moshai of Atla village
- Indranil Mallick as thakurdas Bama's childhood friend
- Arindam Halder as Neel Madhob Chattopadhyay (deceased)
- Anindya Banerjee as Durga Das
- Suchandra Banerjee as Labanya
- Sourav Chatterjee as Labanya's husband
- Gourob Chatterjee as Rabindranath Tagore
- Palash Debnath as the Nayeb of young Rabindranath Tagore
- Niladri Lahiri as Debendranath Tagore
- Samir Biswas as Joggyeswar Tantraguru of Aghoreswar
- Debraj Mukherjee as Rudranath
- Chandraneev Mukherjee as Kalachand Roy
- Mishmee Das as Chandana
- Mimi Dutta
- Rupankar Bagchi
- Biswabasu Biswas as Shri Aurobindo
- Aritra Dutta as Mukunda Das
- Sambhabhi
- Dev Chhat as greedy Zamindar
- Ayesha Bhattacharya as Dakini
- Soumi Chakraborty as Yogini
- Sayantani Sengupta as Lalita
- Surojit Banerjee
- Kaushambi Chakroborty / Alokananda Guha as Maa Bipodtarini
- Sohini Banerjee as Jhunjhuni
- Judhajit Banerjee
- Arijit Chowdhury
- Bimal Chakraborty as Kapalik
- Hirojeet Chatterjee
- Deerghoi Paul
- Tramila Bhattacharya
- Sanchita Bhattacharya as payesh mata
- Priyanka Chakraborty
- Biplab Chatterjee as Bishnu Das
- Avrajit Chakraborty as Shymananda
- Sumanta Mukherjee as Nidhu Sardar
- Sancharee Mukherjee as Sulakkhana's mother
- Anamika Saha
- Nishantika Das
- Anamika Chakraborty
- Partha Sarathi Deb
- Moumita Chakrabarty
- Arindam Ganguly
- Pranabhi Bose / Pallavi Sharma as Kamala
- Sudip Mukherjee
- Raja Goswami as Tarananda
- Biswarup banerjee as mahadevananda(mahadev thakur)
- Madhupriya Chowdhury
- Mainak Dhol

== Reception ==
In week 22 of 2021, the series has risen to fifth place with 3.546 million impressions for the most watched television series in Bengal.
