= Sabyasachi Chowdhury =

Indian television actor

- Born: October 31, 1985 (age 41); Purulia
- Other name: Archi
- Occupation: Actor
- Known for: Mahapeeth Tarapeeth Ramprasad

Sabyasachi Chowdhury (born 31 October 1985) is an Indian Bengali television actor who is known for portraying Bamakhepa in the TV serial Mahapeeth Tarapeeth, a Hindu religious show which aired on Star Jalsha, he also worked in Saat Bhai Champa most recently appeared in the TV serial Ramprasad on Star Jalsha, which concluded in April 2024.

== Career ==
Sabyasachi started his career in television as an actor and acted in serials like Esho Maa Lokkhi, Agnijal, Bhakter Bhogoban Sri Krishna, Jhumur, Om Namoh Shivaay, and Saath Bhai Champa. He later starred in the Bengali television series Mahapeeth Tarapeeth. The series was aired on Star Jalsha and completed 781 episodes before ending in February 2022. Most recently, he worked in Ramprasad, autobiography of Ramprasad Sen, which has also concluded.

== TV series ==
- Mahapeeth Tarapeeth as Bama Charan Chotopadhay / Sadhak Bamakhyapa / Bama
- Saat Bhai Champa as King Nakshatrajyoti
- Jarowar Jhumko as Arnab
- Om Namoh Shivaay as Lord Vishnu
- Jhumur
- Bhakter Bhogobaan Shri Krishna as Yudhisthira
- Agnijal
- Esho Maa Lokkhi
- Ramprasad as Ramprasad Sen
- Jaisalmer Jomjomat as Nilanjan

== Films ==
- Sadhak Bamakhyapa (2026) as Sadhak Bamakhyapa
