= Jaisalmer Jomjomat =

2025 Bengali language web series

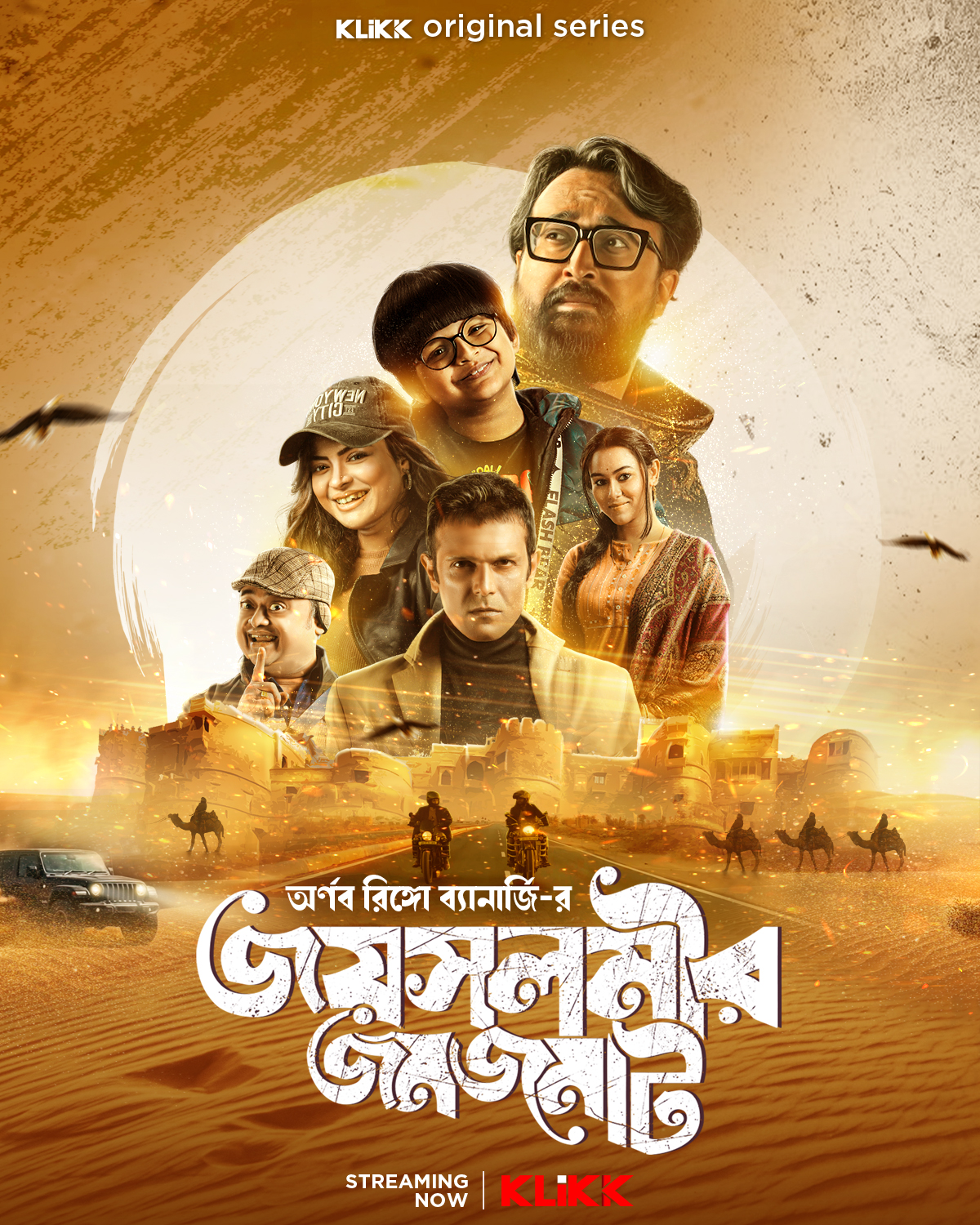
- Genre: Thriller, adventure
- Written by: Riingo Banerjee
- Screenplay by: Sabyasachi Chowdhury
- Directed by: Riingo Banerjee
- Starring: Sabyasachi Chowdhury, Meghla Dasgupta, Devtanu, Pratik Bobby Roy, Amrita Debnath, Debasish Nath, Shahir Raj, Moumita Paul
- Music by: Riingo Banerjee, Shameek Kundu
- Country of origin: India
- Original language: Bengali
- No. of seasons: 1
- No. of episodes: 5

Production
- Producers: Ohendrila Banerjee, Ring a Bell Films
- Cinematography: Riingo Banerjee

Original release
- Release: May 26, 2025

Jaisalmer Jomjomat is a 2025 Indian Bengali language adventure and thriller web series written and directed by Riingo Banerjee.

The series starring Sabyasachi Chowdhury, Meghla Dasgupta, Devtanu, Pratik Bobby Roy, Amrita Debnath, Debasish Nath, Shahir Raj, and Moumita Paul.

The music is composed by Riingo Banerjee and Shameek Kundu. Cinematography is done by Riingo Banerjee.

== Synopsis ==
A Bengali family's holiday in the medieval city of Jaisalmer takes an unforeseen twist when they uncover sinister secrets concealed within the Golden Fort. A sightseeing excursion rapidly transforms into a captivating adventure replete with intrigue, treachery, and peril. The family unravels layers of mystery while navigating a web of deception and contending with escalating challenges. KLIKK can be downloaded to view Jaisalmer Jomjomat online.

== Cast ==
- Sabyasachi Chowdhury as Nilanjan
- Meghla Dasgupta as Rituparna
- Devtanu as Rakesh
- Pratik Bobby Roy as Anwar
- Amrita Debnath as Oishi
- Debasish Nath as Rajat
- Shahir Raj as Mukesh
- Moumita Paul as Madhu
- Abhishek Singh as Raman
- Duke Bose as Joy
- Rajdeep Pal as Dhruv

== Episodes ==
No.	Title	Directed by	Original release date
1	"GONDOGOL"	Riingo Banerjee	26 May 2025
The Ganguly family travels to Jaisalmer to explore the iconic Sonar Kella. A drug deal goes south and the cartel begins the hunt for the missing drugs. The family is about to get entangled in the nexus as they fall under the cartel radar.
2	"PHAND"	Riingo Banerjee	26 May 2025
The couple who met the Ganguly's in the train has secrets of their own. Oishi's plan to meet her boyfriend in the sky lead them to the barren lands of the Thar desert where they witness a murder and soon become prey of the gang that committed the crime.
3	"BOMBETE"	Riingo Banerjee	26 May 2025
The NIA officers get into the act and soon Oishi's boyfriend becomes the prime focus for the agency. The parents are shocked to hear that their daughter planned this trip to get her boyfriend introduced to them. The cartel begins to close in to the family. A truth of the travelling couple is exposed.
4	"BICCHU"	Riingo Banerjee	26 May 2025
Ribhu is taken. Joy is stabbed. Ransom is announced. The traitors get identified. Risks go up. Rescue seems impossible. Action begins.
5	"KELLAFATE"	Riingo Banerjee	26 May 2025
The war begins and new friends and enemies are exposed. Can the Ganguly family rescue their son? Can the agency men kill the cartel? Everything leads to a Jomjomat climax.
