= Varanasi Junction (TV series) =

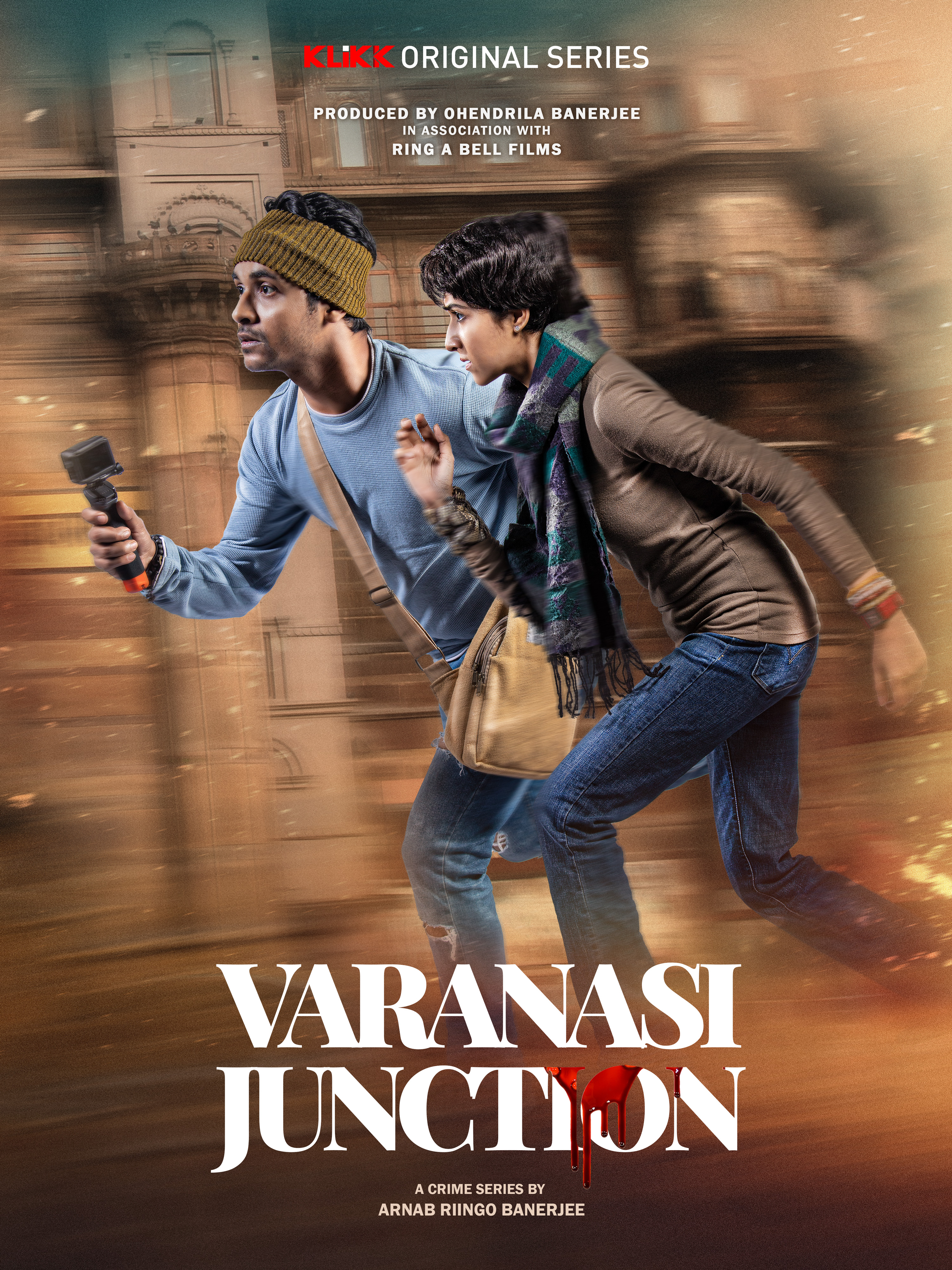
- Genre: Crime & Thriller
- Story by: Arnab Riingo Banerjee
- Directed by: Arnab Riingo Banerjee
- Starring: Amrita Chattopadhyay, Jeet Sundor Chakraborty, Riddhish Chowdhury, Judhajit Sarkar, Arup Zaigirdar, Agniva Banerjee
- Music by: Tirthankar Majumdar
- Country of origin: India
- Original language: Bengali
- No. of seasons: 1
- No. of episodes: 5

Production
- Producers: Ohendrila Banerjee and Ring a Bell Films
- Cinematography: Arnab Riingo Banerjee

Original release
- Network: Klikk
- Release: 23 March 2023

Varanasi Junction is a 2023 Indian Bengali language thriller and crime streaming television series written and directed by Arnab Riingo Banerjee. The series is produced by Ohendrila Banerjee and Ring a Bell Films. The series was released on 23 March 2023.

== Cast ==
- Amrita Chattopadhyay as Supriya Chowdhury
- Jeet Sundor Chakraborty as Ronodip Sen
- Riddhish Chowdhury as Roy
- Judhajit Sarkar as Wajib Suleman
- Arup Zaigirdar as Gokul Pandey
- Agniva Banerjee as Ashwin Pathak
- Korak Samanta as Ranga
- Abhijit Sengupta as Abdul
- Md Kareem as Taya

== Plot ==
Varanasi Junction is a pursuit thriller set in the heart of Varanasi, in which a teenage YouTube blogger recognises a missing girl in the news and passes information, only to become a target in one of the most violent criminal rackets operating in the holy city. Every step he makes is being watched, and he doesn't know whom to trust in a place where he doesn't belong.

== Episodes ==
No.	Title	Directed by	Original release date
1	"A Murder On Camera"	Arnab Riingo Banerjee	23 March 2023
Ronodip, a Youtube vlogger, travels to Varanasi and, while vlogging, sees a murder and chooses to investigate, only to discover that the perpetrators are after him.
2	"Clues And Secrets"	Arnab Riingo Banerjee	23 March 2023
Freelance journalist Supriya is set to disclose breaking news on a crime ring operating in Varanasi when her partner is pursued and killed. She resolves to go against her racket alone, and she quickly becomes a marked victim like Ronodip.
3	"Find The Criminals"	Arnab Riingo Banerjee	23 March 2023
When Ronodip and Supriya meet paths, the killings begin, and it is only a matter of time before they, too, fall victim to the gang's gunfire.
4	"A Trap Is Set"	Arnab Riingo Banerjee	23 March 2023
When bodies start to fall, Supriya realises she has a chance to save Ronodip, and they both go incognito to save themselves. However, as a team, they both have their own strategies for cracking the case.
5	"The Verdict"	Arnab Riingo Banerjee	23 March 2023
The case's twists are disclosed, and Ronodip sacrifices himself to allow Supriya to receive her due since she will identify the ones running the scam.
