= Love (2008 Bengali film) =

- Directed by: Riingo Banerjee
- Written by: Erich Segal
- Produced by: Shree Venkatesh Films
- Starring: Jisshu Sengupta; Koel Mallick
- Music by: Jeet Gannguli
- Production company: Shree Venkatesh Films
- Distributed by: Shree Venkatesh Films
- Release date: 11 July 2008
- Country: India
- Language: Bengali
- Budget: $100,000

Love is a 2008 Bengali film by Indian director Riingo Banerjee, and based on Love Story by Erich Segal.

== Plot ==
The film is about two young people in love, who battle the odds, live through the tough times with a smile and who take a vow to never part until death. Jisshu plays Rahul Ray, a rich Hindu boy and management student, who falls in love with Ria Fernandez, a poor Christian music student, played by Koel Mallick.

== Cast ==
- Jisshu Sengupta as Rahul Ray
- Koel Mallick as Ria Fernandez
- Krishnokishore Mukherjee
- Chaitali Dasgupta
- George Baker

== Soundtrack ==
Love

Soundtrack album by Jeet Gannguli
- Released: 2008
- Recorded: 2007
- Studio: Shree Venkatesh Films
- Genre: Feature film soundtrack
- Language: Bengali
- Label: SVF
- Producer: Shree Venkatesh Films

Jeet Gannguli chronology
Premer Kahini (2008)	Love (2008)	Chirodini Tumi Je Amar (2008)

Singles from Love
- 1. "Purono Smritira" Released: 30 Jan 2019; 2. "Prithibi Onek Boro" Released: 30 Jan 2019; 3. "Kalke Chilam Jajabar" Released: 30 Jan 2019

All music is composed by Jeet Gannguli.

No.	Title	Lyrics	Singer(s)	Length
1.	"Purono Smritira"	Gautam Susmit	Saptak Bhattacharjee	4:11
2.	"Prithibi Onek Boro"	Gautam Susmit	Dibyendu Mukherjee, Monali Thakur	4:26
3.	"Kalke Chilam Jajabar"	Gautam Susmit	Saptak Bhattacharjee, Monali Thakur	3:02
4.	"Aami Chanchala He (Bonus Track)"	Rabindranath Tagore	Monali Thakur
