= Kali Puja =

Hindu festival dedicated to the goddess Kali

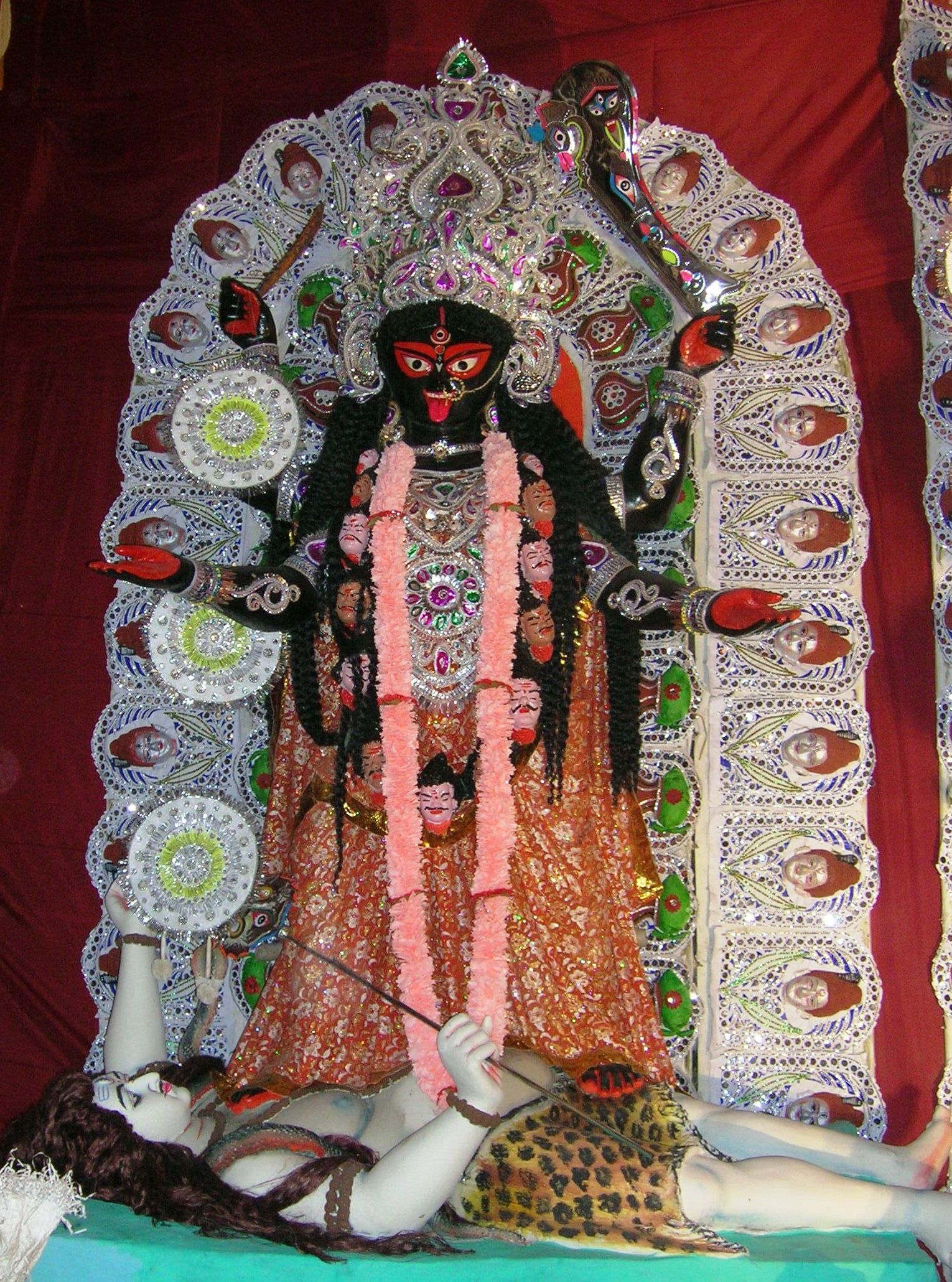
- Goddess Kali
- Observed by: Hindus
- Type: Hinduism
- Celebrations: Fireworks
- Observances: Puja, prasadam
- Date: Ashwayuja 30 (Amanta); Karthika 15 (Purnimanta)
- 2025 date: 20 October
- 2026 date: 8 November
- 2027 date: 29 October
- 2028 date: 17 October
- Frequency: Every year

Kali Puja (ISO: Kālī Pūjā), (Bengali: কালীপূজা) also known as Shyama Puja or Mahanisha Puja, is a festival originating from the Indian subcontinent, dedicated to the Hindu goddess Kali. It is celebrated on the new moon day (Dipannita Amavasya) of the Hindu calendar month of Ashwayuja (according to the amanta tradition) or Kartika (according to the purnimanta tradition). The festival is especially popular in the regions of Barasat, Naihati, Barrackpore, Begampur, Kolkata, Basirhat and Tamluk in West Bengal, Bhagalpur in Bihar's Anga, and Magadha and other places like Jharkhand, Odisha, Assam, and Tripura, along with the neighbouring country of Bangladesh.

== History ==
Descriptions of Kali in Sanskrit texts from the late medieval period point to her growing popularity alongside other goddesses. She appears in the vernacular genre of mangalkavya in the 17th century, and the Kalikamangalkavya describes worship of Kali.

Kali Puja is a major festival in West Bengal. Kali Puja became widespread in the eighteenth century through patrons. In Bengal during the 18th century, King Krishnachandra of Nadia also made this puja wide spread. Kali Puja saw a surge in popularity in the 19th century, coinciding with the rise in prominence of the Kali devotee Sri Ramakrishna among Bengalis. This period marked a significant shift, as affluent landowners began to sponsor the festival extensively, leading to grander and more elaborate celebrations.

== Significance ==
Kali Puja is a reminder for devotees that they depend on Kali, who can be either compassionate or wrathful, and thus their life is fragile.Also Goddess kali is believed to bridge the gap between death and immortality for her true devotees.

== Worship in Bengal ==
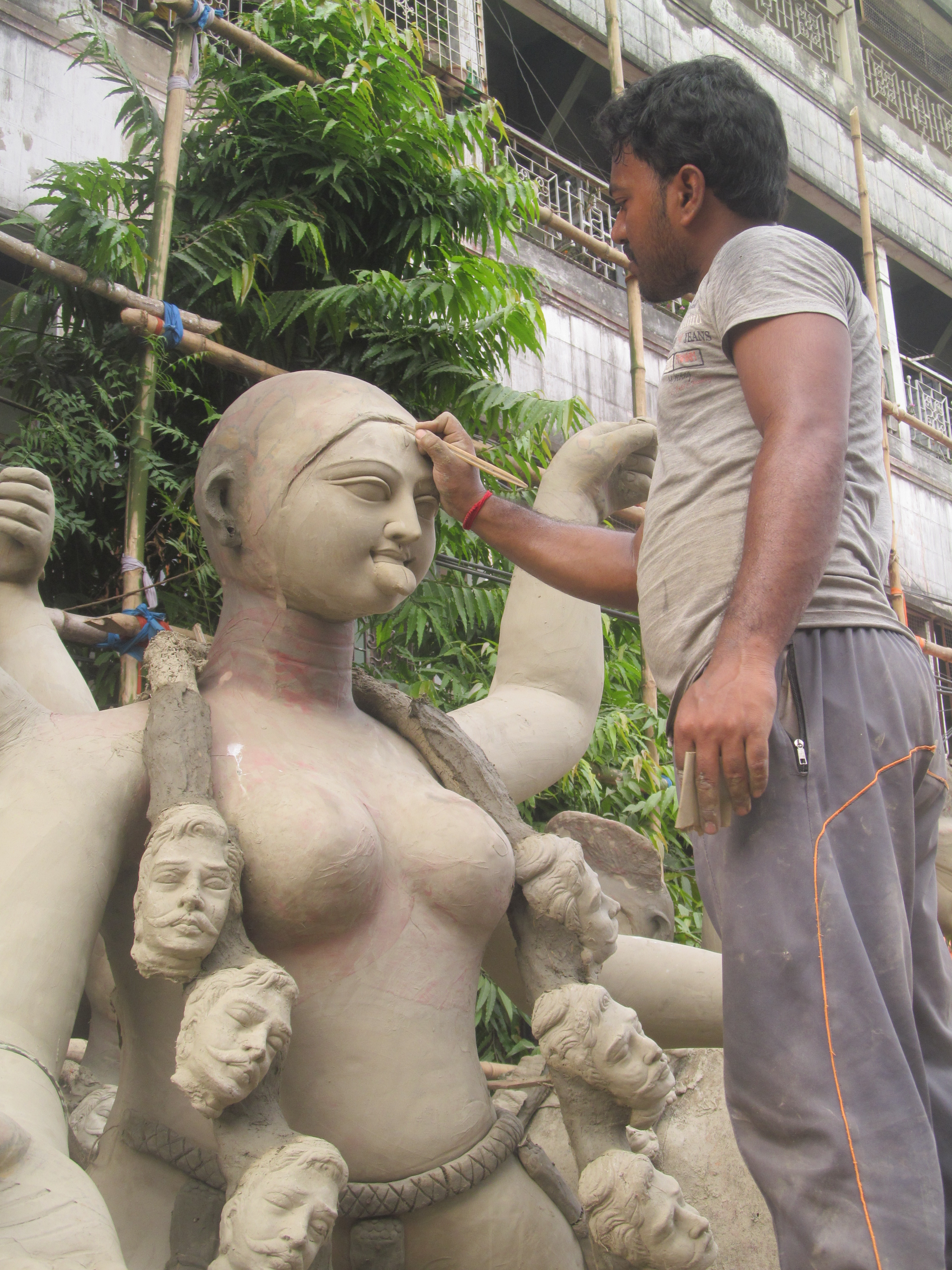
Artisan making an idol of goddess Kali at Kumortuli, Kolkata

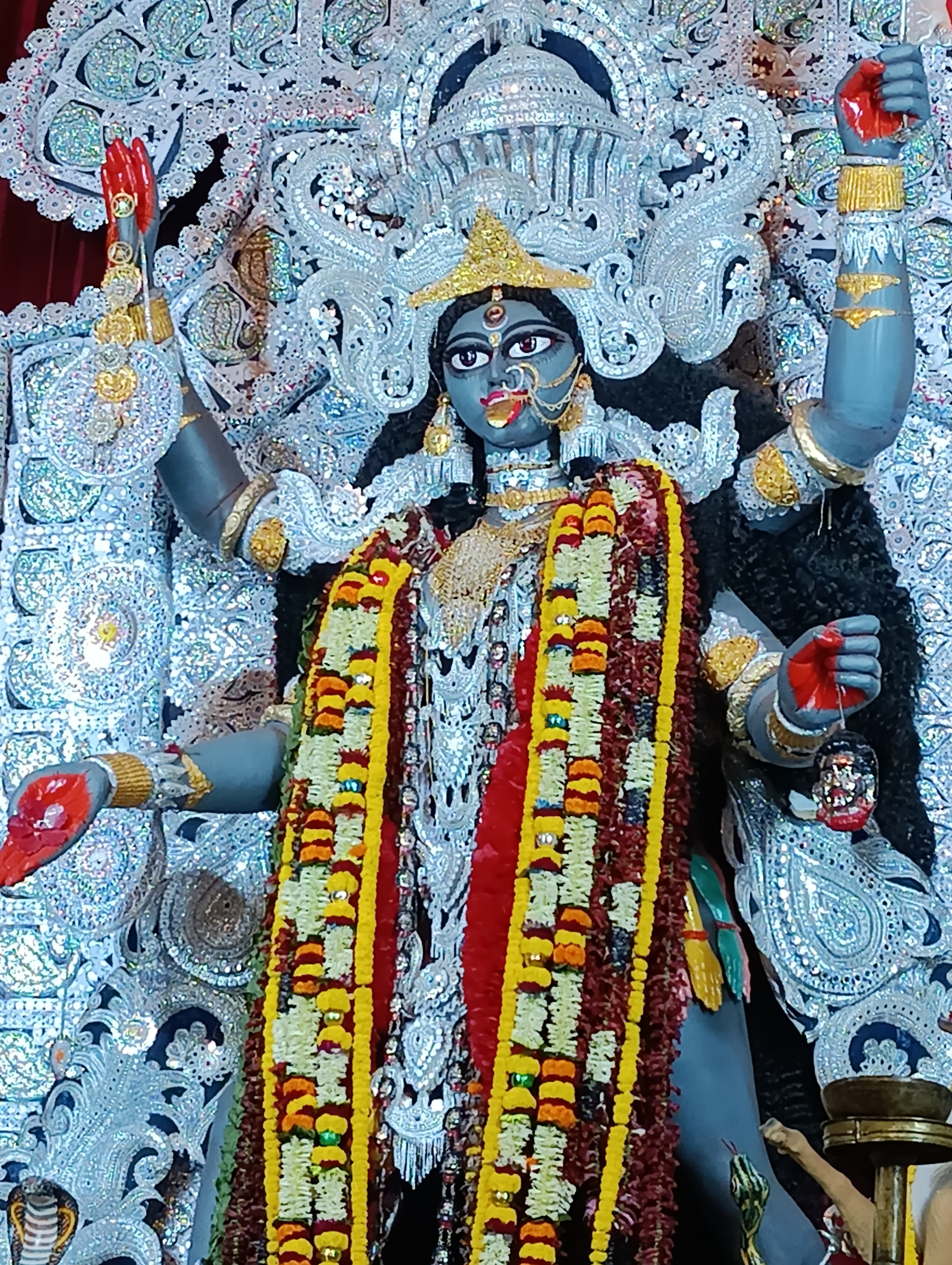
Kali Puja celebration at amherst street in Kolkata

Kali Puja takes place on the same night as Diwali.

During Kali Puja worshippers honor the goddess Kali in their homes in the form of clay sculptures and in pandals (temporary shrines or open pavilions). She is worshipped at night with tantric rites and mantras. She is prescribed offerings of red hibiscus flowers, sweets, rice, and lentils. It is prescribed that a worshipper should meditate throughout the night until dawn. Homes and pandals may also practice rites in the Brahmanical (mainstream Hindu-style, non-Tantric) tradition with ritual dressing of Kali in her form as Adya Shakti Kali and no animals are sacrificed. She is offered food and sweets made of rice, lentils, and fruits.

However, in Tantric tradition, animals are ritually sacrificed on Kali Puja day and offered to the goddess. A celebration of Kali Puja in Kolkata is held in a large cremation ground (Kali is believed to dwell in cremation grounds). Barasat-Madhyamgram, Tamluk, Ranaghat, Begampur, Barrackpore, Naihati, Basirhat, areas of South Bengal and Siliguri, Dhupguri, Dinhata, Coochbehar area of North Bengal is well known for their majestic pandals, lightings and Idols. Meanwhile Barasat's Kali Puja celebration is the largest in the entire West Bengal. Durga Puja of Kolkata is often said synonymously with Kali Puja of Barasat. The region experiences Lacs of footfalls during the days of the festival. People from different regions gather to witness the majestic pandals.

The pandals also house images of Kali's consort, Shiva, two famous Bengali Kali devotees named Ramakrishna and Bamakhepa, along with scenes from mythology of Kali and her various forms, including images of the Mahavidyas, sometimes considered as the "ten Kalis." The Mahavidyas is a group of ten Tantric goddesses headed by Kali. People visit these pandals throughout the night. Kali Puja is also the time for magic shows, theater, and fireworks. Recent custom has incorporated wine consumption.

In the Kalighat Temple in Kolkata, Kali is worshipped as Lakshmi on this day. The temple is visited by thousands of devotees who give offerings to the goddess. Another famous temple dedicated to Kali in Kolkata is Dakshineswar Kali Temple, where Sri Rāmakrishna performed rites. (Note: See Harding 1998, pp. 125–6 for a detailed account of the rituals in Dakshineshwar.)

== Kali Puja in Bhagalpur ==
Kali Puja is a significant festival in the Anga region of Bihar, particularly in Bhagalpur. It is also celebrated in other regions of Bihar like Munger, Katihar and Purnea.

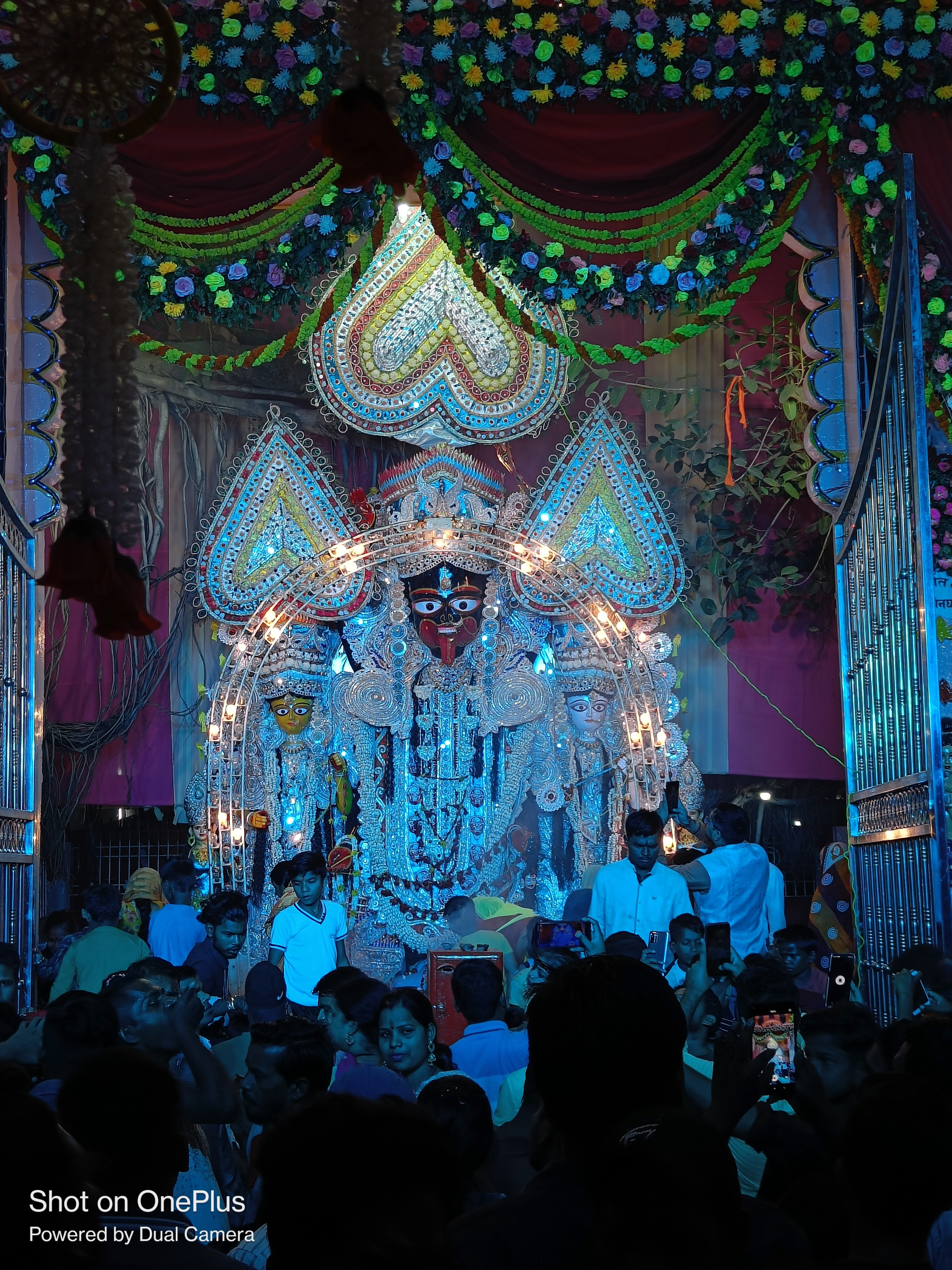
Parbatti Budhiya Kali

Bhagalpur is notorious for hundreds of Kali Puja Pandals throughout the district. The city also has a tradition of a grand procession. After the puja, around 80-90 idols decks up in a line starting from the Station chowk to Kali visarjan ghat, and the procession with tableau from different puja committees, vibrant Aarti and lightings.

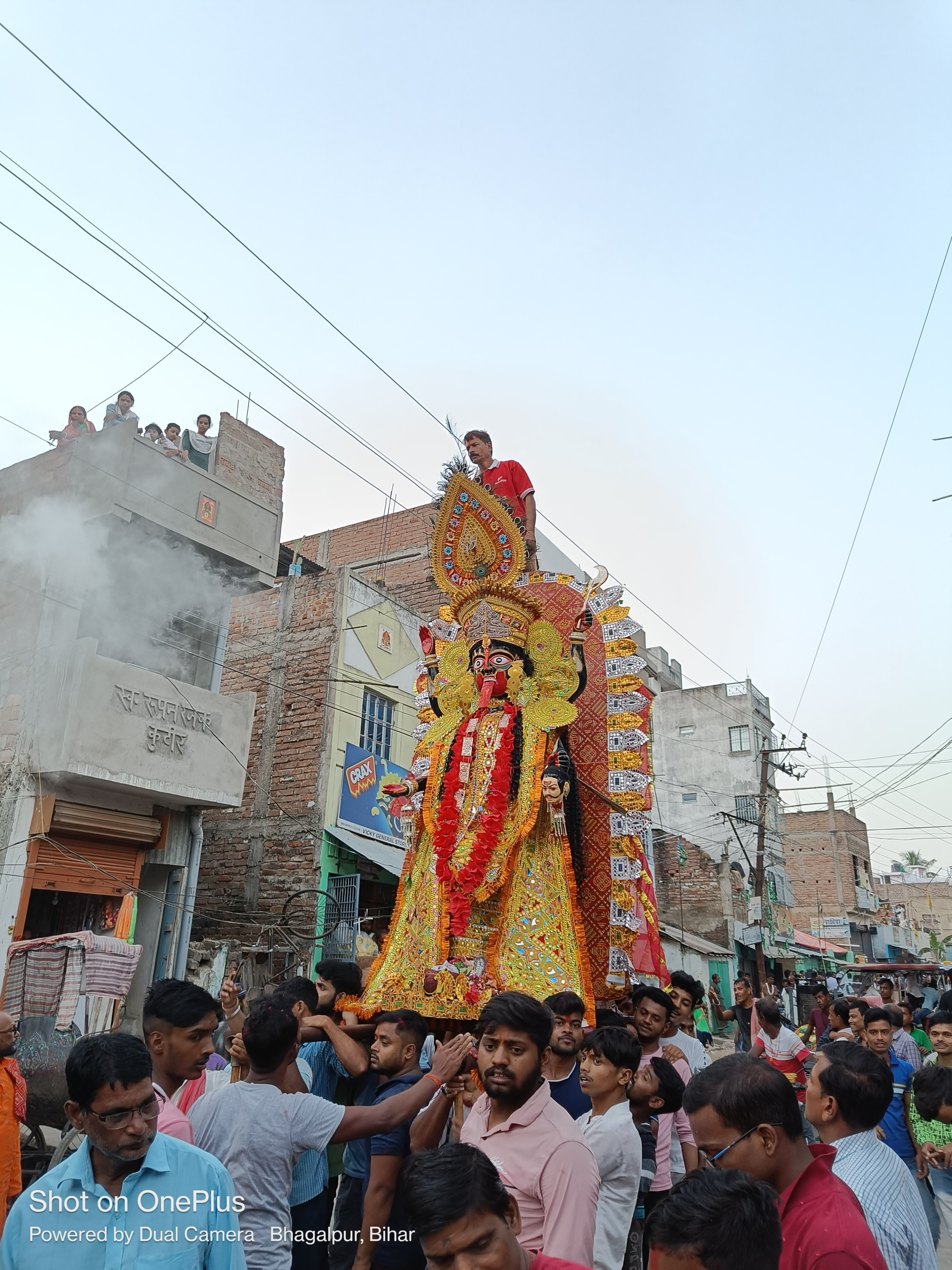
Bhagalpur Kali Puja (Champanagar)

The traditional procession has completed its 71years in 2024. But, it is not the only procession, another procession with around 35-40 idols are taken from the Nathnagar area to Champa nadi ghat. Nonetheless, Bihpur of Bhagalpur has its own grand visarjan with 22 feet idols taken on the shoulders. The Bengali communities and Bari (Private) pujas do their ritual processions earlier than the bigger ones.

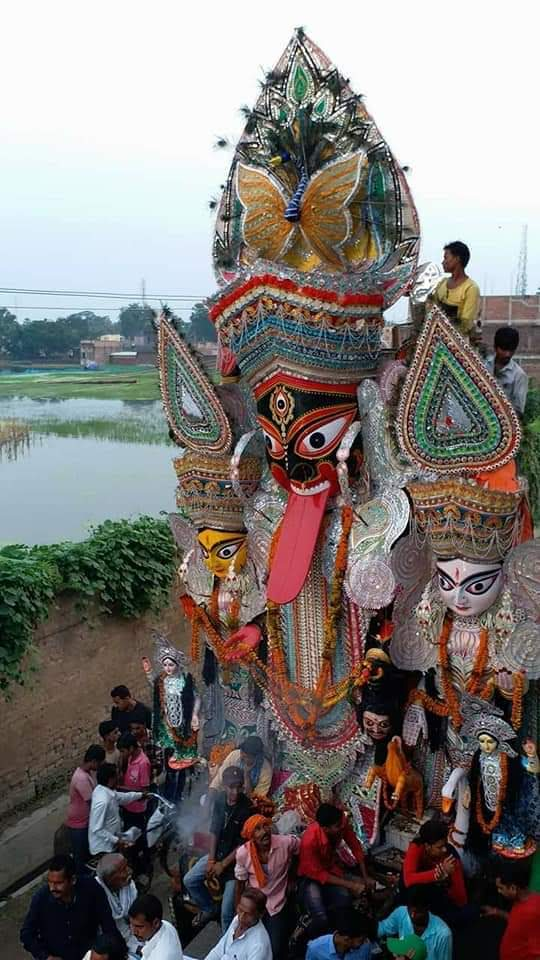
32feet Bama Kali of Bahbalpur, Bhagalpur

The largest traditional idol of Bhagalpur is of Bahbalpur Puja committee which is around 32feet. Other big Kali idols include Parbatti Budhiya Kali (22feet), Maheshpur Badi Kali(25feet), Jarlahi (25 feet), Budhanath's Bama Kali (21 feet), etc.

== Other celebrations ==
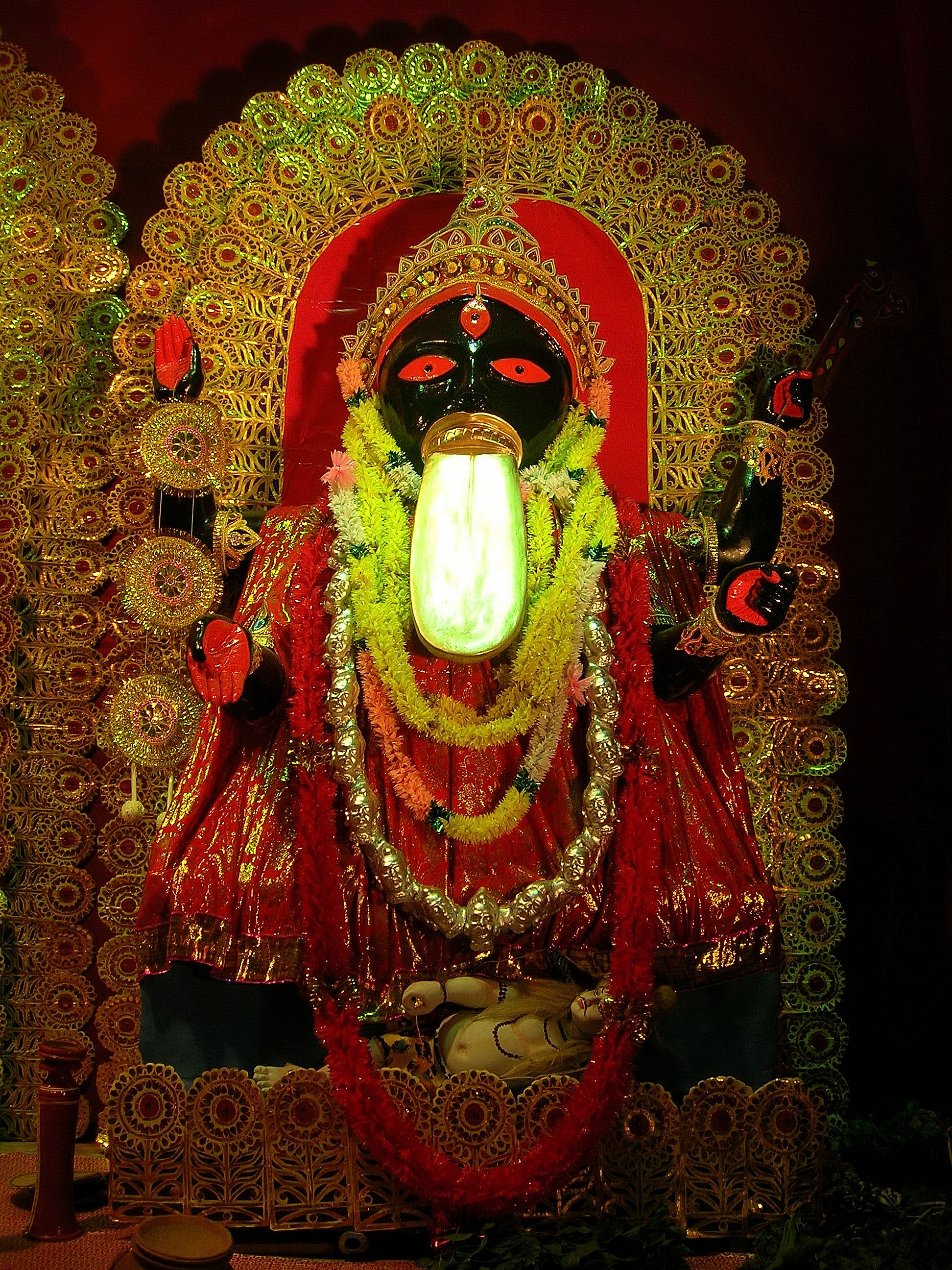
A Kali Puja pandal with a replica of the Kalighat Kali Temple icon.

Although the widely popular annual Kali Puja celebration, also known as the Dipanwita Kali Puja, is celebrated on the new moon day of the month of Kartika, Kali is also worshipped in other new moon days too. Three other major Kali Puja observations are Ratanti Kali Puja, Phalaharini Kali Puja and Kaushiki Amavasya Kali Puja. Kaushiki amavasya Kali Puja is greatly associated with the goddess Tara of Tarapith as it is considered the day when Devi Tara appeared on earth and blessed sadhak Bamakhepa, also according to the legends on this day the doors of both the "Naraka" and the "swarga" open for some time, while Ratanti puja is celebrated on Magha Krishna Chaturdashi and Phalaharini puja is celebrated on Jyeshta Amavashya of Bengali calendar. The Phalaharini Kali Puja is especially important in the life of the saint Ramakrishna and his wife Sarada Devi, since on this day in 1872, Ramakrishna worshipped Sarada Devi as the goddess Shodashi. In many Bengali and Assamese households, Kali is worshipped daily.

== Shyama Sangeet ==
Generally all music dedicated to goddess Mother Kali is called 'Shyama Sangeet' in Bengali. Two famous singers of this Bengali Shyama Sangeet are Pannalal Bhattacharya and Dhananjay Bhattacharya. Pannalal Bhattacharya's elder brother Prafulla Bhattacharya and middle brother Dhananjay Bhattacharya were the first music teachers of saint artist Pannalal Bhattacharya. Dhananjay Bhattacharya stopped singing devotional songs after finding devotional spirit in his brother Pannalal. However, after the demise of Pannalal Bhattacharya, he contributed again in Bengali music with many devotional songs by his sweet, melodious voice.
