= Riingo Banerjee =

Indian film director and composer

Arnab Riingo Banerjee
- Born: 1969 (age 56–57); Kolkata, India
- Occupations: Film director, Score composer
- Years active: 2005–present
- Spouse: Shomi Kaiser (m. 1999–2001)

Arnab Riingo Banerjee, better known as Riingo Banerjee (Bengali: রিঙ্গো ব্যানার্জী), is an Indian Bengali film director and score composer.

== Family and personal life ==
Banerjee has a sister, Amrita, who resides in New Jersey. His father Amiya Banerjee died in 2020.

Banerjee was married to Bangladeshi actress Shomi Kaiser from 1999 to 2001.

== Career ==
Banerjee worked in the advertising industry for 14 years before entering the world of cinema working as a film writer, director, cinematographer and editor. He was the first person to introduce digital cinema in East India.

== Awards ==
- Anandalok Awards – Best director for Love (2008)

== Filmography (as director) ==
- Kranti (2006) – As director, editor, composer, cinematographer
- Neel Rajar Deshe (2008)
- Love (2008)
- Risk (2009)
- Jodi Ekdin (2010)
- Ray (2010) (television release)
- System (2011)
- Na Hannyate (2012)
- Sada Kalo Abcha (2013)
- Ghuri (2014)
- Road (2016)
- Luv Story TBA
- Messi (2017)
- Ray (2018)
- Dayamanti (2018)
- Senapati (2019)
- Senapatis: Volume 1 (2019) (Addatimes series)
- Checkmate (2020) (Addatimes original short film)
- Karma (2020) (Addatimes original film)
- Senapatis: Volume 2 (2021) (Addatimes series)
- Pilkunj (2023)
- Varanasi Junction (2023) – As director, editor, writer and cinematographer
- Jaisalmer Jomjomat (2025)
