= Mohanananda Brahmachari =

Hindu guru

Shree Shree Mohanananda Brahmachari
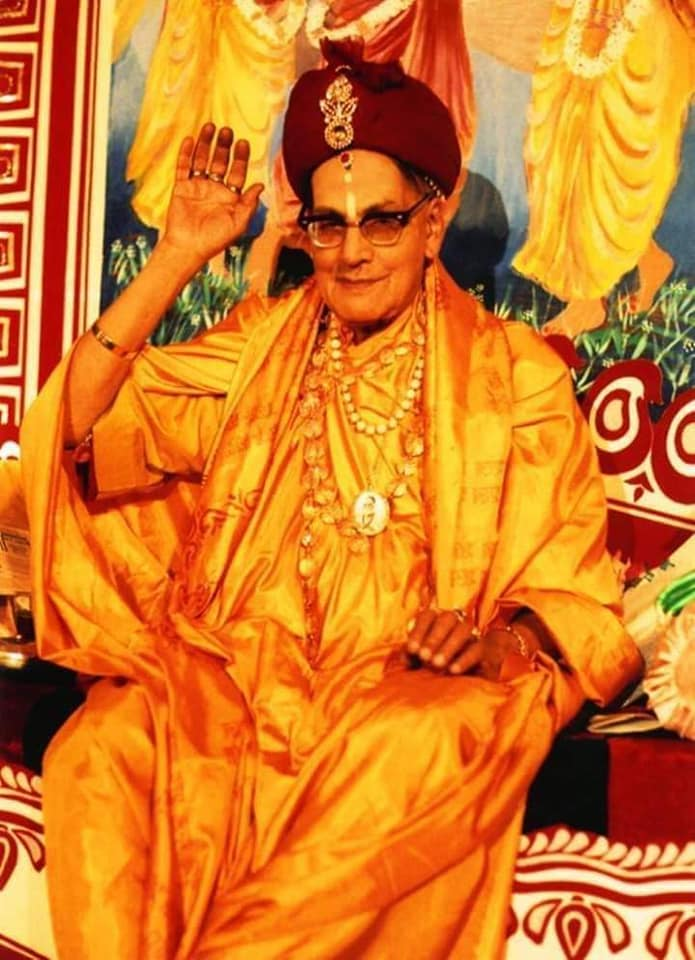
- Shree Shree Mohanananda Brahmachari

Personal life
- Born: Manamohan Bandapadhyay; 17 December 1904 Midnapore, West Bengal
- Died: 29 August 1999 (aged 95) Tennessee, United States
- Website: https://balanandaashrams.org/

Religious life
- Religion: Hinduism
- Philosophy: Naishṭhika Brahmacharya

Religious career
- Teacher: Sri Sri Balananda Brahmachari

Shree Shree Mohanananda Brahmachari (17 December 1904 – 29 August 1999) was an Indian spiritual guru. He was the second Mohanta (Head) of the Ram Niwas Brahmacharya Ashram, Deoghar. He also created number of trusts, social service foundations, hospitals, medical centers, and schools under his Guru's name, Guru Sri Sri Balananda Brahmachari across India.

His childhood name was Manmohon Banerjee and was second son of Sri Hem Chandra Banerjee and Srimoti Binoyini Debi. He was born at Khaprelbazar in Midnapur town of West Bengal. By birth He is descendant of Bhatta Narayan Family and belonging to "Sandilya Gotra". He studied at C.M.S School of Bhagalpur, and on English Medium School of Dhanbad. He passed Entrance equivalent to Matriculation / Secondary Examination in first division in the year 1920. He studied intermediate in Scottish Church College and stayed in Ogilivie Hostel.

== Ashrams and institutions ==
Sri Sri Mohanananda Brahmachari was associated with the Balananda Brahmachari tradition and was involved in establishing and developing religious, charitable and social-service institutions under the name of his guru, Sri Sri Balananda Brahmachari. The Sri Sri Balananda Ashrams organisation lists several ashrams and tirthashrams associated with this tradition across India.

=== Ashrams and tirthashrams ===
| State | City | Location | Address | Ashram/Tirthashram | Year Est | Website |
|---|---|---|---|---|---|---|
| Jharkhand | Deoghar | | P.O. Ashram Karanibad, Deoghar - 814143 | Sri Sri Balananda Ashram | | |
| West Bengal | Kolkata | Belghoria | 4, Dr. R. N. Tagore Road, Kolkata - 700076 | Jugal Mandir Sri Sri Balananda Tirthashram | | |
| West Bengal | Kolkata | Jamir Lane | 10/3, Jamir Lane, Ekdalia, Ballygunge, Kolkata - 700019 | Sri Sri Balananda Ashram | | |
| West Bengal | Bolpur | | Tourist Lodge Road, Bhubanandaga, Bolpur, Birbhum - 731204 | Sri Sri Mohananda Tirthashram | | |
| West Bengal | Durgapur | | P.O. Nadiha, Durgapur - 713201 | Sri Sri Balananda Tirthashram | | |
| West Bengal | Berhampur | | Mohananadadebayatalv, Churamon Chowdhury Lane, Berhampur - 742101 | Sri Sri Balananda Tirthashram Unit | | |
| West Bengal | Bankura | | Prorap Bagan, Bankura - 722101 | Sri Sri Balananda Tirthashram | | |
| West Bengal | Siligui | | Opposite Gate No 2 of North Bengal University, P.O. North Bengal University, Matigara, Siliguri - 734 013 | Sri Sri Mohanananda Brahmachari Sevashram | 2010 | https://srividyacharitabletrust.org/ |
| Odisha | Puri | | Sea Beach Road, Puri - 752001 | Sri Sri Balananda Tirthashram | | |
| Uttarakhand | Badrinath | | P.O. Badrinath, Dist: Chamuli - 246422 | Sri Sri Balananda Tirthashram | | |
| Uttarakhand | Rishikesh | | 13, Virhadra Road, Rishikesh - 249201 | Sri Sri Balananda Tirthashram | | |
| Uttarakhand | Haridwar/Kankhal | | By Bpass Road, Kankhal, P.O. Haridwar - 249408 | Sri Sri Balananda Tirthashram | | |
| Uttar Pradesh | Varanasi | | 8-31179, SHIVALA, Near Haris Chandra Ghat , Varanasi - 221001 | Sri Sri Balananda Tirthashram | | |
| Uttar Pradesh | Vrindavan | | Aras Mandir Road, Vrindaban - 281121 | Sri Sri Mohananda Ashram | | |
| Delhi | New Delhi | | Kali Mandir Society, Chittaranjan Park, New Delhi - 110019 | Sri Sri Balananda Tirthashram | | |

== Other Charitable institutions ==
| State | City | Institution | Address |
|---|---|---|---|
| West Bengal | Kolkata | Behala Balananda Brahmacharai Hospital & Research Centre | Balananda Brahmacharai Hospital Sarani, 151 & 153, Diamond Harbour Road, Kolkata - 700034 |
| West Bengal | Kolkata | Mohanananda Sishu Seva Pratisthan | 57A, Roy Bahadur Road, Behala, Kolkata - 700034 |

== Image gallery ==
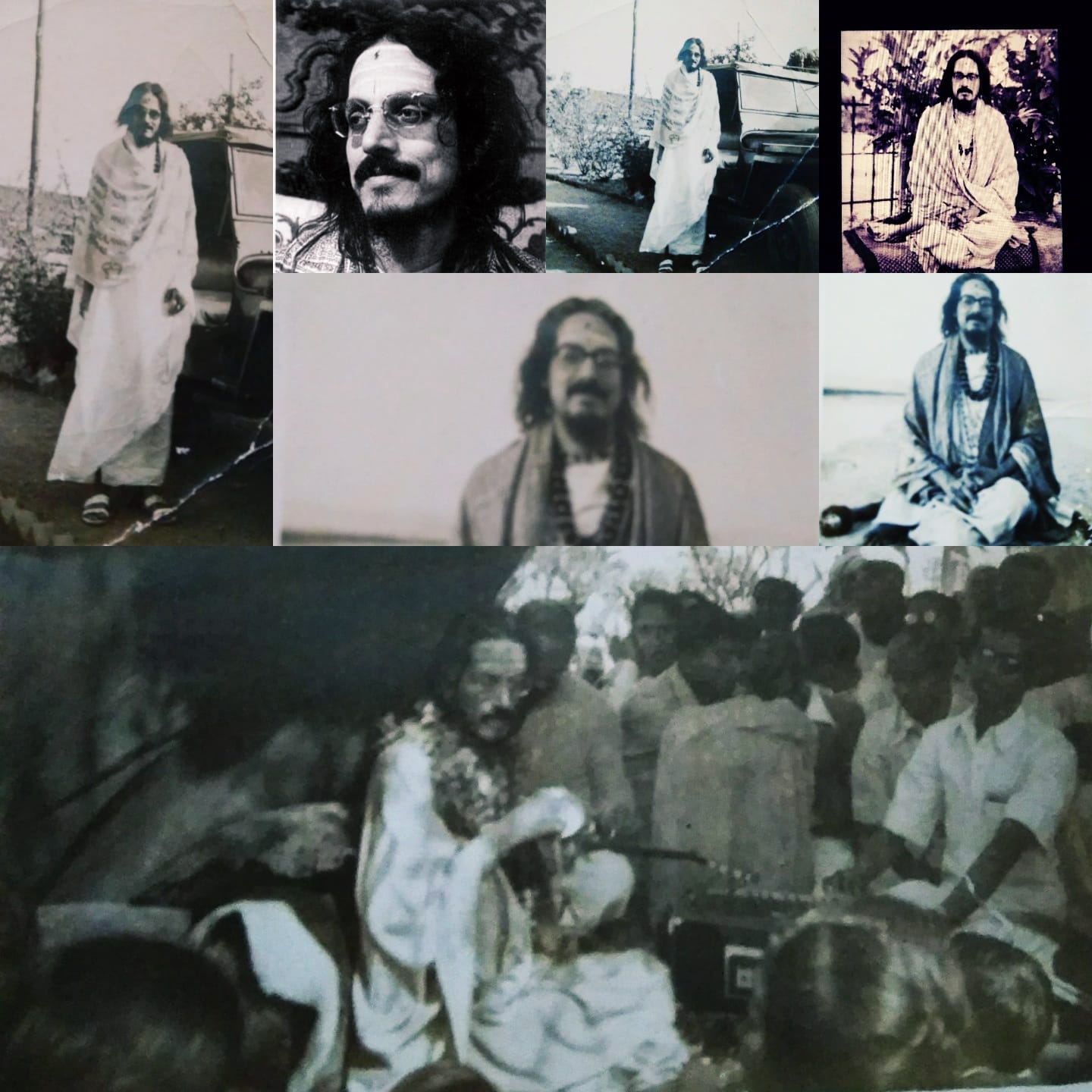

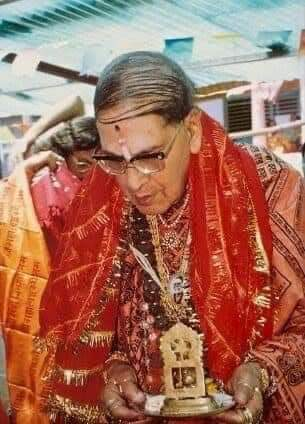

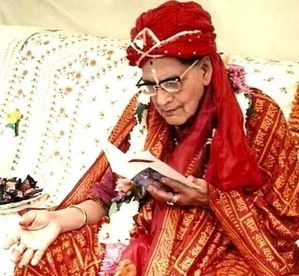

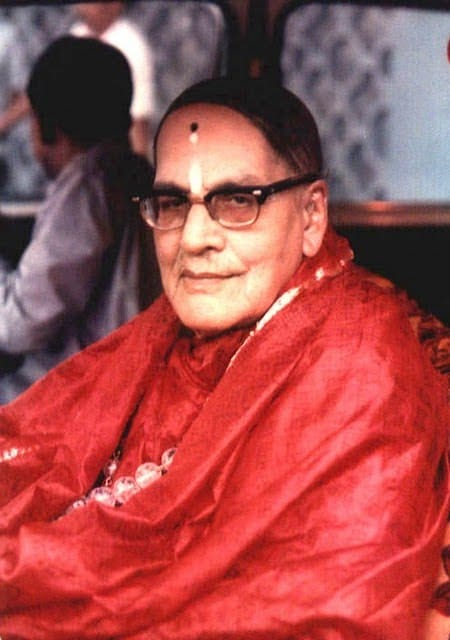
