= Tara (Mahavidya) =

Hindu goddess

Mahavidyas Sequence
- Predecessor: Kali
- Successor: Shodashi

In the Shaivism and Shaktism tradition of Hinduism, the goddess Tara (Sanskrit: तारा, Bengali: তারা, IAST: Tārā) is the second of the ten Mahavidyas. She is considered a form of Ādishakt. Her three most famous forms are Ekajaṭā, Ugratara, and Nīlasarasvatī (also spelled Neelasaraswati, Neela Saraswati, or Neelsaraswati). Her most famous centre of worship is the temple and the cremation ground of Tarapith in West Bengal, India.

== Legends ==
The commonly known origin of Tara is from the 17th chapter of the Rudrayāmala which describes the initial unsuccessful attempts of the sage Vasiṣṭha in worshipping Tara, and the subsequent meeting with the god Vishnu in the form of Buddha in the region called Mahācīna (Tibet) and his eventual success by the means of kaula rites. She is also described as the form of the Atharvaveda. Her Bhairava is named Akṣobhya. According to the Svatantratantra, Tara protects her devotees from difficult (ugra) dangers and so she is also known as Ugratārā. The goddess is all-pervading and also manifests on Earth.

== Historical origin ==
Tara-related beliefs are probably an amalgamation of the beliefs linked to Bhīmā or Nīlā in the geographical region of Oḍḍiyāna which has experienced Buddhist influence. The syncretism between Shaivist and Buddhist cults created a congenial atmosphere for the formation of the traditions of Tārā, both a Hindu and a Buddhist goddess. Her pleasant forms were popular amongst the Buddhists, while the cult of Bhīmā-Ekajaṭā was popular mainly amongst the Shaivas, from whom it merged into Vajrayana Buddhism until it was reintroduced by Vasiṣtha from Mahācīna, which is identified on the basis of the Śaktisaṅgamatantra as a small geographical entity between Kailasa, South East of the lake Manasarovar and near Lake Rakshas Tal, or alternatively located somewhere in Central Asia. Some of the forms of the deity like Mahācīnakrama Tara, also known as Ugra-Tara, are worshipped in both Hindu and Buddhist systems. Her sādhanā described by Śāśvatavajra, which was included in the Buddhist collection of sadhanas called the Sādhanāśatapañcāśikā, which was incorporated in the Phetkarīyatantra and was quoted in tantric manuals like the Bṛhat-tantrasāra by Kṛṣṇānanda Agamavāgīśa with some aspects of the iconography and the subsequent interpretations differing between the Hindu and Buddhist systems.

== Iconography ==
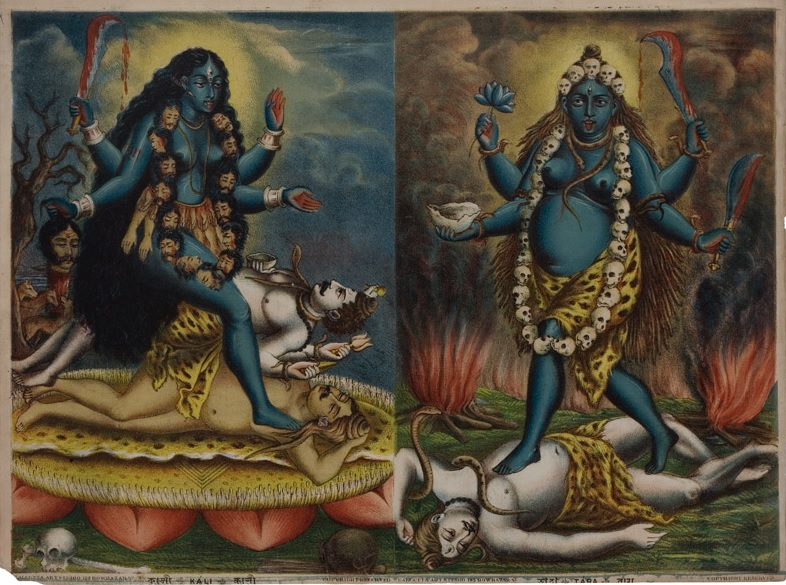
Kali (left) and Tara (right) have similar iconography

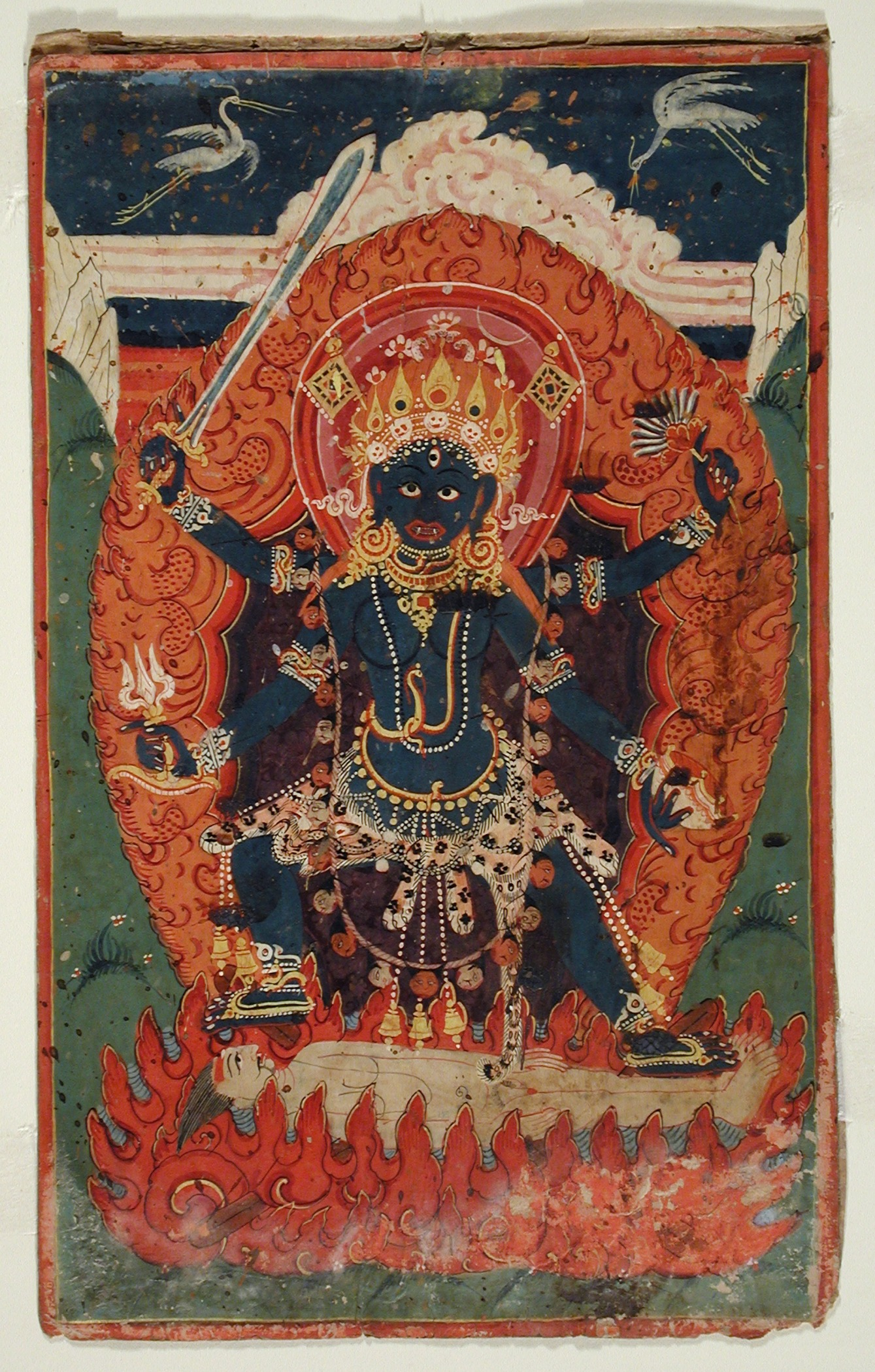
Tara in a form of Ugra-Tara (Violent Tara) in Newari style.

Tara is often described in these chapters as a fierce deity, holding kartrī (knife), khaḍga (sword), chamara (Fly-whisk) or indivara (lotus) and a single matted braid over her head. She is dark in complexion, tall, with a bulging belly, wears tiger pelts, with her left foot on the chest of a corpse and her right foot placed on a lion or between the thighs of the corpse. She has a terrifying laugh and is fearsome. The goddess Tīkṣṇakāntā, who is also considered a form of Tara in the Kalika Purana, has similar iconography with dark-complexion and a single braid (ekajaṭā), and is also pot-bellied.

Hindu goddess Kali and Tara are similar in appearance. They both are described as standing upon a supine corpse sometimes identified with Shiva. However, while Kali is described as black, Tara is described as blue. Both wear minimal clothing, however Tara wears a tiger-skin skirt, while Kali wears only a girdle of severed human arms. Both wear a garland of severed human heads. Both have a lolling tongue, and blood oozes from their mouths. Their appearances are so strikingly similar that it is easy to mistake one for the other. Tara is shown standing in the pratyalidha stance (in which the left foot is forward). Her Bhairava (consort) is Akshobhya, a form of Shiva who is in the form of a naga (serpent) coiled around her matted hair. She wears a crown made of 5 skulls connected with plates of bone. Eight forms of Tara are attested in the Māyātantra quoted in the tantric compendium Tantrasāra and the names are Ekajaṭa, Ugra-Tara, Mahogra, Kameshvari-Tara, Chamunda, Nila-Sarasvati (Neelasaraswati or 'Blue Saraswati'), Vajra-Tara and Bhadrakali.

== Scriptures ==
Tantric scriptures that describe the worship of Tara include Tārātantra, Brahmayāmala, Rudrayāmala, Nīlatantra/Bṛhannīlatantra, Tārātantra, Nīlasarasvatītantra as well as various tantric compendia like Tantrasara by Agamavagisha, Prāṇatoṣiṇī, Tārābhaktisudhārṇava by Narasiṃha Thakkura, or Tārārahasya by Brahmānanda Giri.

Tara is mentioned in the Devi Bhagavata Purana, which states that Nīla Sarasvatī is widely known in Cīna — a term that, in many contexts, refers to regions north or northeast of the Himalayas, including Tibet, Xinjiang, or Central Asia. In certain Tantric traditions, Tara is identified with Nīla Sarasvatī, a fierce blue form of Sarasvatī associated with protection and esoteric knowledge. and also that Svarocisha Manu worshipped the deity on the banks of the Kalindi (Yamuna). She is also attested in the Kalika Purana's 61st, 79th and 80th chapter.

== Modern traditions ==
In Bengal, the literary works of Ramprasad Sen gave a new phase to the classical secretive worship of Tara, and his devotionalism influenced the image of the deity. He addresses Tara as a daughter in his songs. Sadhak Bamakhepa also was a famous siddha of Tara in the modern era. These devotees introduced a public devotional dimension to the secretive tantric worship of this deity and emphasised her motherliness.
