= Tarapith =

- Temple town
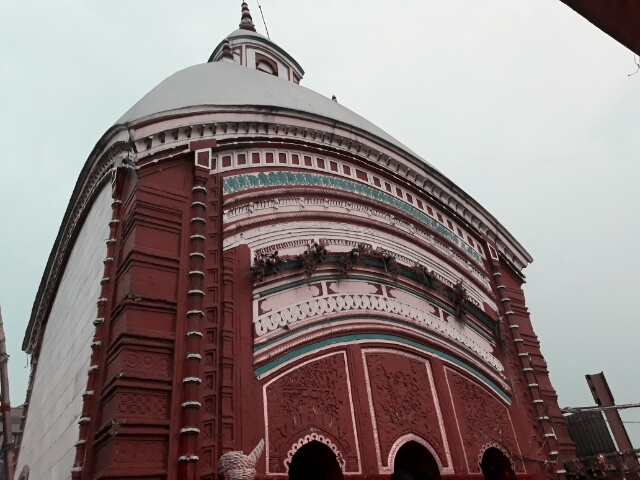
- Spire of Tarapith temple

- Location in West Bengal, India
- Coordinates: 24.11°N 87.80°E
- Country: India
- State: West Bengal
- District: Birbhum

Population
  - Total: 5,000

Languages
  - Official: Bengali
- Time zone: UTC+05:30 (IST)
- Postal code: 731233
- Nearest city: Rampurhat

Tarapith is a town and Hindu pilgrimage site located in Rampurhat subdivision of Birbhum district of the Indian state of West Bengal. The town is particularly known for the Tarapith Temple and its adjoining Hindu crematory ground. The tantric Hindu temple is dedicated to the goddess Tara. Every day, thousands of pilgrims visit the renowned Tarapith Temple. Devotees arrive not only from various parts of West Bengal, but also from neighboring states and different regions across India, to seek blessings at this sacred shrine.

Tarapith is also famous for Tantric saint Bamakhepa, who worshipped in the temple and resided in the cremation grounds. His ashram is also located in bank of Dwaraka river and close to the Tara temple.

== Geography ==
Tarapith is a village of Sahapur Gram Panchayat, located on the banks of the Dwarka River in West Bengal. Situated in the Tarapith Police Station circle, it is surrounded by the green paddy fields on the flood plains. It looks like a typical Bengali village with thatched roof huts and fish tanks. The town is located 6 km from Rampurhat Sub-Division in the Birbhum district. "Rampurhat" and "Tarapith Road" are the nearest Railway stations.

== Bibliography ==
- Dalrymple, William (2009). Nine Lives. Bloomsbury Publishing Plc. pp. 203–233. ISBN 978-1-4088-0153-6.
- Kinsley, David R. (1997). Tantric visions of the divine feminine: the ten mahāvidyās. University of California Press. ISBN 978-0-520-20499-7.
