= Bamakhepa =

Indian tantrik

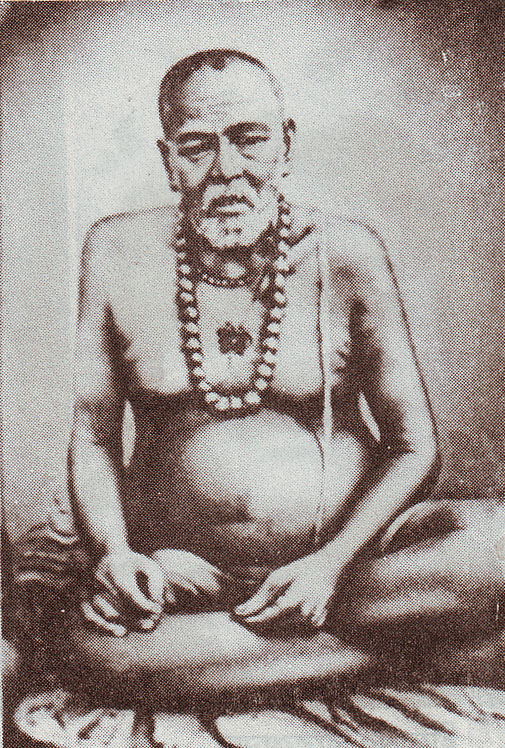
- Bamakhepa

Personal life
- Born: Bamacharan Chattopadhyay; 22 February 1837 Atla village, Birbhum, Bengal Presidency, Company Raj
- Died: 18 July 1911 (aged 74) Tarapith, Birbhum, Bengal Presidency, British Raj
- Honors: Tarapith Bhairav

Religious life
- Religion: Hinduism
- Temple: Tarapith
- Philosophy: Shaktism

Religious career
- Teacher: Swami Kailashpati and Vedagya Mokshadananda
- Disciples: Tarakhepa and Nigamananda Paramahansa

Bamakhyapa (Bengali: বামাখ্যাপা, romanized: Bamakhæpa, lit. 'mad Bama'; 1837–1911), born Bamacharan Chattopadhyay, was an Indian Hindu saint who resided in Tarapith and whose shrine is also located in the vicinity of the Tarapith Temple in Birbhum. He was born at Atla village in the Rampurhat subdivision of the Birbhum district.

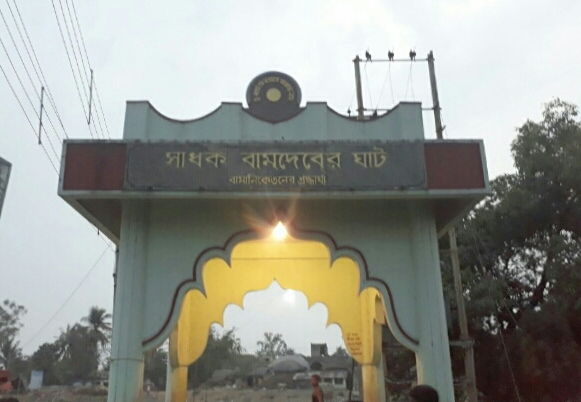
Memorial of Sadhak Bamakhyapa

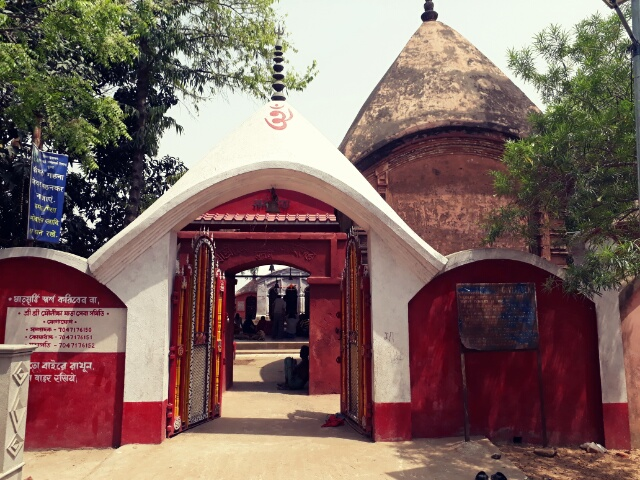
Bamakhyapa's Temple at Maluti in Jharkhand

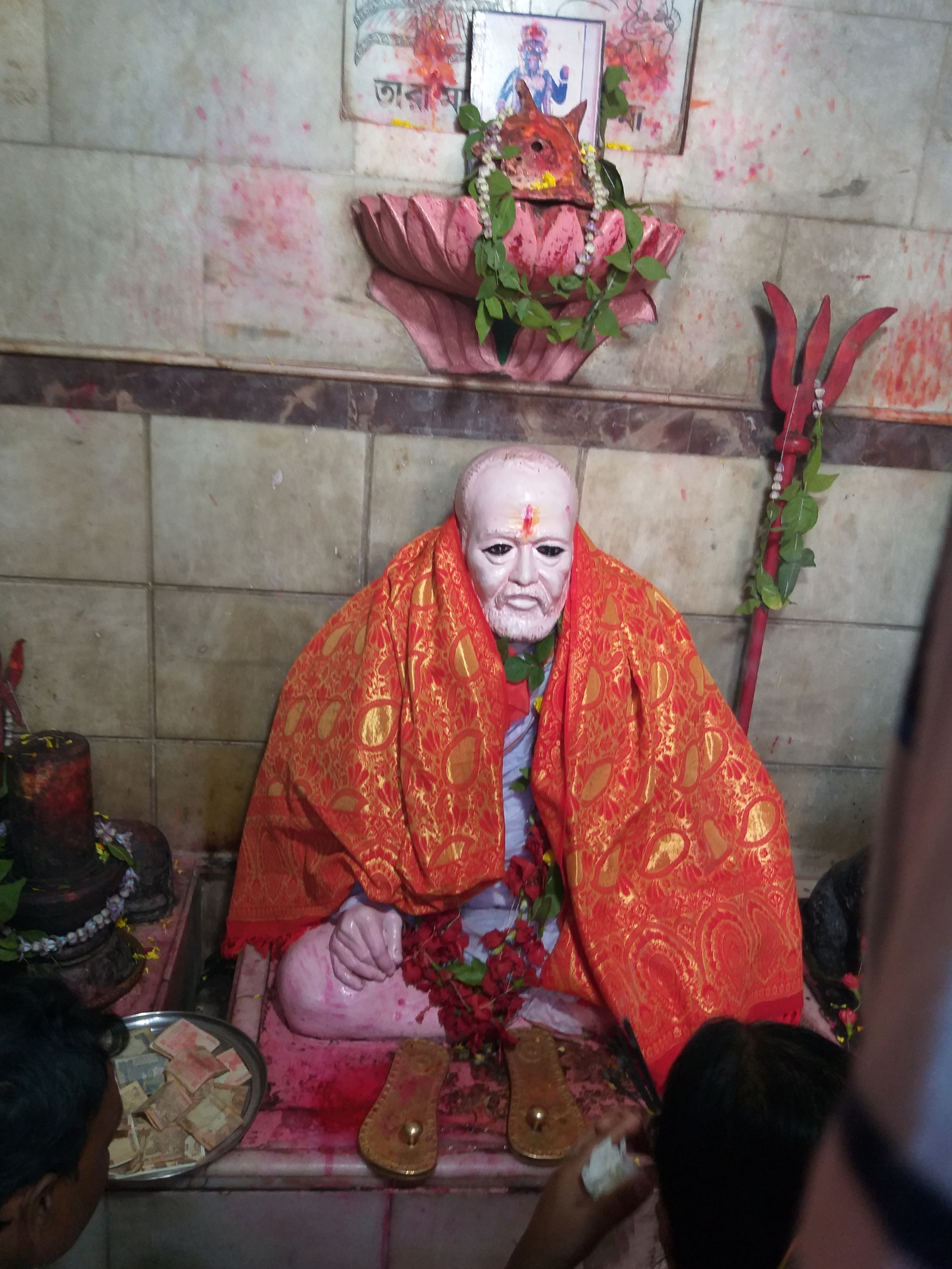
Seated Bamakhepa idol at the Tarapith temple complex

He was an ardent devotee of Goddess Tara and lived near the temple and meditated in the cremation grounds. He stayed in Mouliksha temple for continuing the worship of Holy Mother. Bamakhyapa was fed first in the temple before the deity and nobody obstructed him. It is believed that Goddess Tara gave a vision to Bamakhaypa in the cremation grounds in her ferocious form.

== Popular culture ==
Beginning in 2007, a teleserial named 'Sadhak Bamakhepa' about Bamakhepa ran on television in Bengal. By late 2011, it had run for 1500 episodes.

In 2019 the teleserial Mahapeeth Tarapeeth, the life of the ardent devotee Bamakhepa was also depicted elaborately.
