= Bishnupur, Birbhum =

Bishnupur
- Census Town
- Location in West Bengal Bishnupur (India)
- Coordinates: 24.1312°N 87.8902°E
- Country: India
- State: West Bengal
- District: Birbhum

Area
  - Total: 2.5678 km^{2} (0.9914 sq mi)

Population (2011)
  - Total: 8,118
  - Density: 3,161/km^{2} (8,188/sq mi)

Languages
  - Official: Bengali, English
- Time zone: IST
- PIN: 731244
- Telephone code: 03461
- Lok Sabha constituency: Birbhum
- Vidhan Sabha constituency: Hansan
- Website: birbhum.nic.in

Bishnupur is a census town in Rampurhat II CD block in Rampurhat subdivision of Birbhum district.

== Geography ==
Cities and towns in Rampurhat subdivision of Birbhum district
M: municipal city/ town, CT: census town, R: rural/ urban centre.
Owing to space constraints in the small map, the actual locations in a larger map may vary slightly

=== Location ===
Bishnupur is located at 24.1312°N 87.8902°E.

=== Overview ===
The northern portion of Rampurhat subdivision (shown in the map alongside) is part of the Nalhati Plains, a sub-micro physiographic region, and the southern portion is part of the Brahmani-Mayurakshi Basin, another sub-micro physiographic region occupying the area between the Brahmani in the north and the Mayurakshi in the south. There is an occasional intrusion of Rajmahal Hills, from adjoining Santhal Parganas, towards the north-western part of the subdivision. On the western side is Santhal Parganas and the border between West Bengal and Jharkhand can be seen in the map. Murshidabad district is on the eastern side. A small portion of the Padma River and the border with Bangladesh (thick line) can be seen in the north-eastern corner of the map. 96.62% of the population of Rampurhat subdivision live the rural areas and 3.38% of the population live in the urban areas.

Note: The map alongside presents some of the notable locations in the area. All places marked in the map are linked in the larger full screen map.

== Demographics ==
As per the 2011 Census of India, Bishnupur had a total population of 8,118 of which 4,134 (51%) were males and 3,984 (49%) were females. Population below 6 years was 623. The total number of literates in Bishnupur was 5,719 (78.40% of the population over 6 years).

== Infrastructure ==
As per the District Census Handbook 2011, Bishnupur covered an area of 2.5678 km^{2}. There is a railway station at Rampurhat 13 km away. Buses are available in Rampurhat. It has 11 km roads and open drains. The major source of protected water supply is from bore well pumping. There are 900 domestic electric connections. Amongst the medical facilities it has are 14 medicine shops. Amongst the educational facilities it has are 4 primary schools, 1 middle school, 1 secondary school and 1 senior secondary school. The nearest general degree college is at Rampurhat. There is a public library and reading room at Baswa 1 km away. It has branches of 1 nationalised bank and 1 agricultural credit society. Amongst the commodities it produces are silk products.

== Transport ==
Bishnupur is on Rampurhat-Margram-Bishnupur-Sherpur Road.

== Education ==
Bishnupur Rasamanjari High School, a Bengali-medium co-educational institution, was established in 1918. It has arrangements for teaching from class V to class XII.

== Healthcare ==
Baswa Rural Hospital at Baswa, located nearby, has 30 beds.
