= Hingla =

Hinglow হিংলো
- village
- Location in West Bengal, India Hinglow (India)
- Coordinates: 23.9917°N 87.50425°E
- Country: India
- State: West Bengal
- District: Birbhum

Languages
  - Official: Bengali, English
- Time zone: UTC+5:30 (IST)
- PIN: 731127
- Lok Sabha constituency: Birbhum
- Vidhan Sabha constituency: Rampurhat
- Website: birbhum.nic.in

Hingla is a gram panchayat under Mohammad Bazar (community development block) .It contains villages Chondrapur, Dewanganj, Korapukur, Sarenda, Hinglo, Palon, Nischintopur.

== Demographics ==
Hingla gram panchayat is lying beside the river Dwarka River. It contains echo friendly villages with peaceful villagers. The village palan is a milkman ( ghosh /ঘোষ) majority and "Borbore" is a tribal village. The village Chondrapur is famous for the Dwarbasini temple
