= Birbhum Coalfield =

wbpdcl
- Interactive map of wbpdcl
- Location: Deucha, Pachami, West Bengal, India; 23.985875°N 87.524411°E
- Products: Coal
- Opened: 2025

Birbhum coal field is a large coal field located in the east of India in West Bengal. Birbhum is having estimated reserves of 5 billion tonnes of coal.It is the largest coal block in Asia and the second largest in the world. This coal block has a thick coal seam sandwiched between equally thick layers of rock. It is a difficult proposition to take out the coal.Everything is on a rather large scale with coal mining on the anvil in Birbhum Coalfields. The challenges are enormous.

Deucha Pachami coal block spread over an area of 9.7 km^{2} is to be developed by Bengal Birbhum Coal Company Limited. Another potential coal reserve is Dewanganj Harinsingha block with an estimated area of 2.6 km^{2}. These blocks are located in Mohammad Bazar (community development block), Birbhum, India.

Now, have a look at the human side of the problem. Around 21,000 persons have to be relocated and rehabilitated. 4,134 houses belong to Scheduled Tribes, Scheduled Castes minorities and others. 9,034 Santals will be affected. Central and state governments have announced compensation packages for the displaced persons. Each family will be paid Rs. 10-13 lakhs per bigha of land. Each displaced family will be given a 600 square feet house in the rehabilitation colony plus Rs. 5.5 lakhs to cover displacement expenses. The state government has announced that one member of each displaced family will be absorbed as a junior constable in the police force. At least 160 agricultural workers will get Rs. 50,000 in cash plus assured 500 days of work. However, even with all the sops many indigenous people are opposed to the project because of their being traditionally exploited. Added to these are environmental concerns. Large number of stone crushers are already started polluting the environment.

ET Energy World reports that a bhumi puja was performed in February 2025 to mark the formal start of the Rs 35,000 crore project that promises employment opportunities for about 1 lakh people.The Indian Express feels that while several residents are supporting the project, many others fear mass eviction. It describes the situation there as, “the area around the Deocha Pachami coal mine near the tribal majority village of Chanda in West Bengal’s Birbhum district has been looking like a fortress – a battery of armed policemen and the Rapid Action Force stand guard in makeshift tents as earthmovers pile soil and clay on to waiting trucks, which dump them some 100 yards away.”
