= Deucha =

- Village
- Location in West Bengal, India Deucha (India)
- Coordinates: 24.0466°N 87.5822°E
- Country: India
- State: West Bengal
- District: Birbhum

Languages
  - Official: Bengali, English
- Time zone: UTC+5:30 (IST)
- PIN: 731132
- ISO 3166 code: IN-WB
- Lok Sabha constituency: Birbhum
- Vidhan Sabha constituency: sainthia (SC)
- Website: birbhum.nic.in

Deucha is a village and a gram panchayat in Mohammad Bazar CD Block in Suri Sadar subdivision of Birbhum district in the Indian state of West Bengal.

== History ==
According to a 1845 government data, there had 30 chullis i.e. iron melting furnaces existed at Deucha. In 1855, Mackcey and Co. established Birbhum Iron Works Company and in 1875 Messers Burn and co. had done the same job there. There are many old decorated bricks found every where, which shows old glory of Deucha.

Salui is a Hindu workers caste who are living at Deucha. Saluis were the head of 'saal' i.e. home-made iron-furnace. Sontsaal is a nearby village where Muslim 'saal' workers had lived.

At the time of King Ram Pal, Deucha was under 'Kujabati' state.

== Geography ==
Cities and towns in Suri Sadar subdivision of Birbhum district
M: municipal city/ town, CT: census town, R: rural/ urban centre, B: Barrage.
Owing to space constraints in the small map, the actual locations in a larger map may vary slightly

=== Location ===
Deucha consists of a gram panchayat, 'Deucha Gram Panchayat'. The name Deucha is a mysterious word. Deucha has its burnt soil and a lot of signs of previous iron ore melting industry.

The village is situated near the Dwarka River. An eco park is situated at Deucha on the bank of Dwarka River near Sahapara. Deucha barrage is situated on the Dwarka river with a capacity of 1,400 acre-feet (1,700,000 m^{3}).

== Demographics ==
As per the 2011 Census of India, Deucha had a total population of 1,772 of which 894 (50%) were males and 878 (50%) were females. Population below 6 years was 266. The total number of literates in Deucha was 1,066 (70.78% of the population over 6 years).

== Economy ==
=== Coal ===
Deucha Pachami coal block is to be developed by Bengal Birbhum Coal Company Limited.

Government of India has allocated 17 coal blocks with estimated reserves of 85,000 million tonnes of coal to public sector undertakings under MMDR act. Deucha Pachami coal block is estimated about 9.7 km^{2}.

== Transport ==
NH 14 (old no. NH 60) passes beside Deucha. There is an old laterite road connecting Deucha with 'Boliharpur' and then with Jharkhand. Sri Chaitanya Mahaprabhu and Mahavir had walked through this road.

== Culture ==
Ram Navami is held at Saluipara Ramji temple. Poush Sankranti fair is held at Dwarbasini near Deucha.Ratha yatra fair is held at Deucha rathtala. Every year during Ram navami, the song of Ramayana and kirtana are performed. This Ramji temple was established by Sitaram Das Mohanta, a saint probably from Uttar Pradesh, and the first priest of the temple was Satkari Bandopadhaya from nearby Chondrapur village.

Dharma pujo is held at Deucha on the occasion of Buddha Purnima.

Every year at Makar Sankranti a one-day fair is held at Dwarbasini-temple near Chondrapur.

There are many ruined Shiva temples near Sahapara. Some of these temples were reconstructed by Ananta Majumdar, a former policeman with the help of other people.

Near Deucha there is a Jain religious place "Jogi Pahari Tirth" where Bhagwan Mahavir stayed for three night because of serious illness by snake bite. Many pilgrims come here from around the world.
