= Mohammad Bazar (community development block) =

- Community development block
- Location in West Bengal
- Coordinates: 23°59′31″N 87°34′19″E
- Country: India
- State: West Bengal
- District: Birbhum
- Parliamentary constituency: Birbhum
- Assembly constituency: Sainthia, Rampurhat

Area
  - Total: 315.64 km^{2} (121.87 sq mi)

Population (2011)
  - Total: 164,570
  - Density: 521.39/km^{2} (1,350.4/sq mi)
- Time zone: UTC+5.30 (IST)
- PIN: 731127
- Literacy Rate: 65.18 per cent
- Website: http://birbhum.nic.in/

Mohammad Bazar is a community development block that forms an administrative division in Suri Sadar subdivision of Birbhum district in the Indian state of West Bengal.

== Overview ==
Birbhum district is physiographically a part of the ancient Rarh region. The western portion of the district is basically an extension of the Chota Nagpur Plateau. The area has mostly loose reddish lateritic low fertility soil. In the east, the flood plains of the major rivers, such as the Ajay, Bakreshwar, Mayurakshi and Brahmani, have soft alluvial soil. The forest cover is only 3.5% of the total district. Although coal is found in the district and Bakreshwar Thermal Power Station has a capacity of 2,010 MW, the economic condition of Birbhum is dominated by agriculture. From 1977 onwards majorland reforms took place in West Bengal. Land in excess of land ceiling was acquired and distributed amongst the peasants. In Birbhum district, 19,968 hectares of vested agricultural land has been distributed amongst 161,515 beneficiaries, till 2011. However, more than 38% of the operational land holding is marginal or less than 1 acre. The proportion of agricultural labourers amongst total workers in Birbhum district is 45.9%, the highest amongst all districts of West Bengal. Culturally rich Birbhum, with such traditional landmarks as Jaydev Kenduli and Chandidas Nanoor, is home to Visva-Bharati University at Santiniketan, having close association with two Nobel laureates – Rabindranath Tagore and Amartya Sen.

== Geography ==
Map of Birbhum district showing CD blocks and municipal areas. Click on the map to view larger map.

Mohammad Bazar is located at 23°59′31″N 87°34′19″E.

Mohammad Bazar CD Block is partly in the Brahmani-Mayurakshi Basin, one of the four sub-micro physiographic regions occupying the area between Brahmani River in the north and Mayurakshi River in the south. This block extends into Bakrehswar Upland, another sub-micro physiographic region.

Mohammad Bazar CD Block is bounded by Rampurhat I CD Block on the north, Mayureswar I and Sainthia CD Blocks on the east, Suri I and Suri II CD Blocks on the south and Ranishwar CD Block, in Dumka district of Jharkhand, on the west.

Deucha Barrage across the Dwarka has a capacity of 1,700,000 cubic metres (1,400 acre⋅ft),

Mohammad Bazar CD Block has an area of 315.64 km^{2}. It has 1 panchayat samity, 12 gram panchayats, 86 gram sansads (village councils), 158 mouzas and 138 inhabited villages. Mohammad Bazar police station serves this block. Headquarters of this CD Block is at Patel Nagar.

Gram panchayats of Mohammad Bazar block/panchayat samiti are: Angargoria, Bharkata, Bhutura (Seharakuri), Charicha, Deucha, Gonpur, Hinglow, Kapista, Mohammad Bazar, Puranagram, Rampur and Sekedda.

== Demographics ==
=== Population ===
As per the 2011 Census of India, Mohammad Bazar CD Block had a total population of 164,570, all of which were rural. There were 83,590 (51%) males and 80,980 (49%) females. Population below 6 years was 23,346. Scheduled Castes numbered 43,814 (26.62%) and Scheduled Tribes numbered 31,152 (18.93%).

As per 2001 census, Mohammad Bazar block had a total population of 139,478, out of which 71,430 were males and 68,048 were females. Mohammad Bazar block registered a population growth of 19.91 per cent during the 1991-2001 decade. Decadal growth for Birbhum district was 17.88 per cent. Decadal growth in West Bengal was 17.84 per cent.

Large villages (with 4,000+ population) in Mohammad Bazar CD Block are (2011 census figures in brackets): Hatgachha (5,557), Haridaspur (4,494), Sonthsal (4,687), Dighalgram (6,284), Baluti (4,304) and Angar Garia (4,232).

Other villages in Mohammad Bazar CD Block include (2011 census figures in brackets): Mohammad Bazar (3,090), Bhutura (416), Deucha (1,772), Kapishta (1,401), Sekeddaha (3,016), Rampur (930), Hingla (721), Puranagram (1,924) and Ganpur (2,706).

=== Literacy ===
As per the 2011 census the total number of literates in Mohammad Bazar CD Block was 92,045 (65.18% of the population over 6 years) out of which males numbered 51,892 (72.26% of the male population over 6 years) and females numbered 40,153 (57.85% of the female population over 6 years). The gender disparity (the difference between female and male literacy rates) was 14.41%.

See also – List of West Bengal districts ranked by literacy rate

Literacy in CD blocks of
Birbhum district
Rampurhat subdivision
Murarai I – 55.67%
Murarai II – 58.28%
Nalhati I – 69.83%
Nalhati II – 71.68%
Rampurhat I – 73.29%
Rampurhat II – 70.77%
Mayureswar I – 71.52%
Mayureswar II – 70.89%
Suri Sadar subdivision
Mohammad Bazar – 65.18%
Rajnagar – 68.10%
Suri I – 72.75%
Suri II – 72.75%
Sainthia – 72.33%
Dubrajpur – 68.26%
Khoyrasol – 68.75%
Bolpur subdivision
Bolpur Sriniketan – 70.67%
Ilambazar – 74.27%
Labpur – 71.20%
Nanoor – 69.45%
2011 Census: CD Block Wise

Primary Census Abstract Data

=== Language and religion ===
Religion in Mohammad Bazar CD block (2011)
Hinduism	67.15%
Islam	31.29%
Christianity	0.77%
Sarna	0.60%
Other or not stated	0.19%

In the 2011 census, Hindus numbered 110,506 and formed 67.15% of the population in Mohammad Bazar CD Block. Muslims numbered 51,487 and formed 31.29% of the population. Christians numbered 1,266 and formed 0.77% of the population. Others numbered 1,311 and formed 0.80% of the population.

The proportion of Hindus in Birbhum district has declined from 72.2% in 1961 to 62.3% in 2011. The proportion of Muslims in Birbhum district has increased from 27.6% to 37.1% during the same period. Christians formed 0.3% in 2011.

Languages in Mohammad Bazar CD block (2011)
1. Bengali (78.3%)
2. Santali (17.0%)
3. Khortha (3.51%)
4. Others (1.20%)

At the time of the 2011 census, 78.28% of the population spoke Bengali, 17.01% Santali and 3.51% Khortha as their first language.

== Rural poverty ==
As per the BPL household survey carried out in 2005, the proportion of BPL households in Mohammad Bazar CD Block was 35.3%, against 42.3% in Birbhum district. In six CD Blocks – Murarai II, Nalhati II, Rampurhat II, Rampurhat I, Suri II and Murarai I – the proportion of BPL families was more than 50%. In three CD Blocks – Rajnagar, Suri I and Labhpur – the proportion of BPL families was less than 30%. The other ten CD Blocks in Birbhum district were placed in between. According to the district Human Development Report, Birbhum, “Although there is no indication that the share of BPL households is more in blocks with higher share of agricultural labourer, there is a clear pattern that the share of BPL households is more in blocks with disadvantaged population in general and Muslim population in particular.” (The disadvantaged population includes SCs, STs and Muslims.)

== Economy ==
=== Livelihood ===
Livelihood
in Mohammad Bazar CD Block
1. Cultivators (15.4%)
2. Agricultural labourers (44.9%)
3. Household industries (2.44%)
4. Other Workers (37.2%)

In Mohammad Bazar CD Block in 2011, amongst the class of total workers, cultivators numbered 9,692 and formed 15.43%, agricultural labourers numbered 28,197 and formed 44.89%, household industry workers numbered 1,534 and formed 2.44% and other workers numbered 23,393 and formed 37.24%. Total workers numbered 62,816 and formed 38.17% of the total population, and non-workers numbered 101,754 and formed 61.83% of the population.

Note: In the census records a person is considered a cultivator, if the person is engaged in cultivation/ supervision of land owned by self/government/institution. When a person who works on another person’s land for wages in cash or kind or share, is regarded as an agricultural labourer. Household industry is defined as an industry conducted by one or more members of the family within the household or village, and one that does not qualify for registration as a factory under the Factories Act. Other workers are persons engaged in some economic activity other than cultivators, agricultural labourers and household workers. It includes factory, mining, plantation, transport and office workers, those engaged in business and commerce, teachers, entertainment artistes and so on.

=== Infrastructure ===
There are 138 inhabited villages in Mohammad Bazar CD Block, as per District Census Handbook, Birbhum, 2011. 100% villages have power supply. 136 villages (98.55%) have drinking water supply. 29 villages (21.01%) have post offices. 132 villages (95.65%) have telephones (including landlines, public call offices and mobile phones). 35 villages (25.36%) have a pucca (paved) approach road and 61 villages (44.20%) have transport communication (includes bus service, rail facility and navigable waterways). 8 villages (5.8%) have agricultural credit societies and 7 villages (5.07%) have banks.

=== Agriculture ===
Following land reforms land ownership pattern has undergone transformation. In 2004–05 (the agricultural labourer data is for 2001), persons engaged in agriculture in Mohammad Bazar CD Block could be classified as follows: bargadars 4,069 (8.25%), patta (document) holders 15,274 (30.96%), small farmers (possessing land between 1 and 2 hectares) 4,005 (8.12%), marginal farmers (possessing land up to 1 hectare) 4,675 (9.48%) and agricultural labourers 21,311 (43.20%).

Birbhum is a predominantly paddy cultivation-based agricultural district. The area under paddy cultivation in 2010-11 was 249,000 hectares of land. Paddy is grown in do, suna and sali classes of land. There is double to triple cropping system for paddy cultivation. Other crops grown in Birbhum are gram, masuri, peas, wheat, linseed, khesari, til, sugarcane and occasionally cotton. 192,470 hectares of cultivable land is under irrigation by different sources, such as canals, tanks, river lift irrigation and different types of tubewells. In 2009–10, 158,380 hectares were irrigated by canal water. There are such major irrigation projects as Mayurakshi and Hijli. Other rivers such as Ajoy, Brahmani, Kuskurni, Dwaraka, Hingla and Kopai are also helpful for irrigation in the district.

In 2013–14, there were 38 fertiliser depots, 3 seed stores and 43 fair price shops in Mohammad Bazar CD block.

In 2013–14, Mohammad Bazar CD block produced 2,962 tonnes of Aman paddy, the main winter crop, from 1,017 hectares, 3,937 tonnes of Boro paddy (spring crop) from 1,189 hectares, 3,243 tonnes of wheat from 1,025 hectares, 47,212 tonnes of potatoes from 1,810 hectares and 2,460 tonnes of sugar cane from 34 hectares. It also produced pulses and oilseeds.

In 2013–14, the total area irrigated in Mohammad Bazar CD block was 10,961 hectares, out of which 5,385 hectares were irrigated by canal water, 4,195 hectares by tank water, 875 hectares by river lift irrigation, 171 hectares by deep tube wells, 262 hectares by shallow tube wells, 23 hectares by open dug wells and 50 hectares by other means.

=== Banking ===
In 2013–14, Mohammad Bazar CD block had offices of 5 commercial banks and 3 gramin banks.

=== Coal ===
The Deucha Pachami coal block in Birbhum Coalfield has been allotted jointly to West Bengal (share: 28%), Bihar, Uttar Pradesh, Punjab, Karnataka, Tamil Nadu and Satluj Jal Vidyut Nigam. A new company Bengal Birbhum Coalfields Limited has been formed to mine the new block. The block now has estimated reserves of 2 billion tonnes, but inferred reserves could stretch up to 20 billion tonnes. According to newspaper reports, the block is spread across an area of 1,230 hectares with a 70–80 m thick basalt rock covering the coal seam and it would be difficult to mine the coal. However, the area where it is located is non-agricultural waste land.

=== Other sectors ===
According to the district Human Development Report, 2009, Birbhum is one of the most backward districts of West Bengal in terms of industrial development. Of the new industrial projects set-up in West Bengal between 1991 and 2005, only 1.23% came to Birbhum. Bakreshwar Thermal Power Station is the only large-scale industry in the district and employs about 5,000 people. There are 4 medium-scale industries and 4,748 registered small-scale industries.

The proportion of workers engaged in agriculture in Birbhum has been decreasing. According to the district Human Development Report, “more people are now engaged in non-agricultural activities, such as fishing, retail sales, vegetable vending, selling milk, and so on. As all these activities are at the lower end of the spectrum of marketable skills, it remains doubtful if these activities generate enough return for their family’s sustenance.”

=== Backward Regions Grant Fund ===
Birbhum district is listed as a backward region and receives financial support from the Backward Regions Grant Fund. The fund, created by the government of India, is designed to redress regional imbalances in development. As of 2012, 272 districts across the country were listed under this scheme. The list includes 11 districts of West Bengal.

== Transport ==
Mohammad Bazar CD block has 3 ferry services and 6 originating/ terminating bus routes. The nearest railway station is 11 km from the CD block headquarters.

NH 14 passes through this block and SH 11, which runs from Mohammad Bazar to Ranaghat, originates from Mohammad Bazar.

== Education ==
In 2013–14, Mohammad Bazar CD block had 126 primary schools with 12,702 students, 18 middle schools with 242 students, 10 high schools with 6,012 students and 8 higher secondary schools with 8,963 students. Mohammad Bazar CD Block had 3 technical/ professional institutions with 848 students and 363 institutions for special and non-formal education with 11,647 students.

As per the 2011 census, in Mohammad Bazar CD Block, amongst the 138 inhabited villages, 24 villages did not have a school, 51 villages had more than 1 primary school, 45 villages had at least 1 primary and 1 middle school and 22 villages had at least 1 middle and 1 secondary school. 15 villages had senior secondary schools.

== Healthcare ==
In 2014, Mohammad Bazar CD block had 1 rural hospital, 4 primary health centres and 1 medical facility run by other department/ PSU of state government with total 64 beds and 7 doctors (excluding private bodies). It had 25 family welfare subcentres. 1,652 patients were treated indoor and 89,826 patients were treated outdoor in the hospitals, health centres and subcentres of the CD block.

As per 2011 census, in Mohammad Bazar CD Block, 1 village had a community health centre, 7 villages had primary health centres, 22 villages had primary health subcentres, 6 villages had maternity and child welfare centres, 3 villages had veterinary hospitals, 18 villages had medicine shops and out of the 138 inhabited villages 73 villages had no medical facilities.

Mohammad Bazar Rural Hospital at PO Pattelnagar has 30 beds. There are primary health centres at Bharkata (10 beds), Puranogram (6 beds), Rampur (10 beds) and Sakeddah (PO Dighalgram) (6 beds).
