= Rampurhat II =

- Community development block
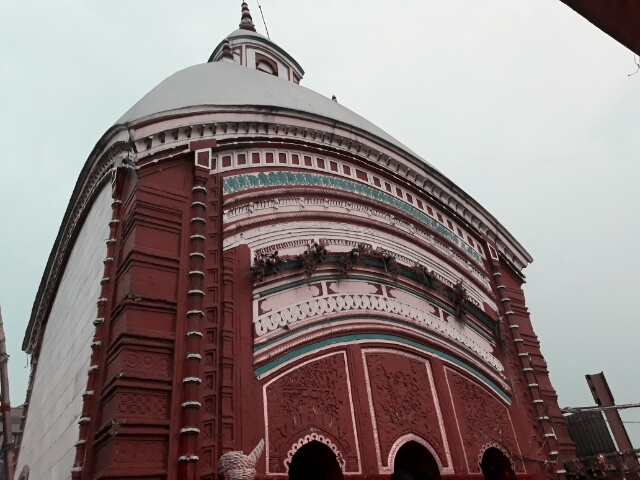
- Ma Tara Temple at Tarapith

- Location in West Bengal

- Location within West Bengal
- Coordinates: 24.201251°N 87.882242°E
- Country: India
- State: West Bengal
- District: Birbhum
- Parliamentary constituency: 42, Birbhum
- Assembly constituency: Hansan

Area
  - Total: 181.55 km^{2} (70.10 sq mi)

Population (2011)
  - Total: 187,823
  - Density: 1,034.6/km^{2} (2,679.5/sq mi)
- Time zone: UTC+5.30 (IST)
- Postal code: 731202
- Literacy Rate: 70.77 per cent
- Website: http://birbhum.nic.in/

Rampurhat II is a community development block that forms an administrative division in Rampurhat subdivision of Birbhum district in the Indian state of West Bengal.

== Overview ==
Birbhum district is physiographically a part of the ancient Rarh region. The western portion of the district is basically an extension of the Chota Nagpur Plateau. The area has mostly loose reddish lateritic low fertility soil. In the east, the flood plains of the major rivers, such as the Ajay, Bakreshwar, Mayurakshi and Brahmani, have soft alluvial soil. The forest cover is only 3.5% of the total district. Although coal is found in the district and Bakreshwar Thermal Power Station has a capacity of 2,010 MW, the economic condition of Birbhum is dominated by agriculture. From 1977 onwards majorland reforms took place in West Bengal. Land in excess of land ceiling was acquired and distributed amongst the peasants. In Birbhum district, 19,968 hectares of vested agricultural land has been distributed amongst 161,515 beneficiaries, till 2011. However, more than 38% of the operational land holding is marginal or less than 1 acre. The proportion of agricultural labourers amongst total workers in Birbhum district is 45.9%, the highest amongst all districts of West Bengal. Culturally rich Birbhum, with such traditional landmarks as Jaydev Kenduli and Chandidas Nanoor, is home to Visva-Bharati University at Santiniketan, having close association with two Nobel laureates – Rabindranath Tagore and Amartya Sen.

== Notable people ==
Muhammad Qudrat-i-Khuda, scientist, educationist and writer, was born in 1900 and spent his childhood at Margram.

       BamaKhepa-A hindu Saint of Tarapith.

== Geography ==
Map of Birbhum district showing CD blocks and municipal areas. Click on the map to view larger map.

Hansan, a constituent panchayat of Rampurhat II block, is located at 24°12′05″N 87°52′56″E.

Rampurhat II CD Block is part of the Brahmani-Mayurakshi Basin, one of the four sub-micro physiographic regions occupying the area between Brahmani River in the north and Mayurakshi River in the south.

Rampurhat II CD Block is bounded by Nalhati I and Nalhati II CD Blocks on the north, Nabagram and Khargram CD Blocks, in Murshidabad district, on the east, Mayureswar I CD Block on the south and Rampurhat I CD Block on the west.

Rampurhat II CD Block has an area of 181.55 km^{2}. It has 1 panchayat samity, 9 gram panchayats, 95 gram sansads (village councils), 94 mouzas and 91 inhabited villages. Margram Police Station and Tarapith Police Station serves this block. Headquarters of this CD Block is at Margram.

Gram panchayats of Rampurhat II block/panchayat samiti are: Bishnupur, Budhigram, Dunigram, Hansan I, Hansan II, Kaluha, Margram I, Margram II and Sahapur.

== Demographics ==
=== Population ===
As per the 2011 Census of India, Rampurhat II CD Block had a total population of 187,823, of which 179,705 were rural and 8,118 were urban. There were 96,532 (51%) males and 91,291 (49%) females. Population below 6 years was 25,320. Scheduled Castes numbered 59,580 (31.72%) and Scheduled Tribes numbered 1,068 (0.57%).

As per 2001 census, Rampurhat II block had a total population of 158,756, out of which 81,973 were males and 76,783 were females. Rampurhat II block registered a population growth of 14.64 per cent during the 1991-2001 decade. Decadal growth for Birbhum district was 17.88 per cent. Decadal growth in West Bengal was 17.84 per cent.

Census Town in Rampurhat II CD Block is (2011 census figure in brackets): Bishnupur (8,118).

Large villages (with 4,000+ population) in Rampurhat II CD Block are (2011 census figures in brackets): Hazarpur (4,634), Tarapur (5,143), Basoa (5,511), Margram (30,055), Bara Karttik Chungri (6,158), Dunigram (8,282) and Tentulia (4,340).

Other villages in Rampurhat II CD Block include (2011 census figures in brackets): Chandpara(3,198), Budhigram (3,259), Hansan (2,186), Kaluha (1,661) and Sahapur (2,180).

=== Literacy ===
As per the 2011 census the total number of literates in Rampurhat II CD Block was 114,999 (70.77% of the population over 6 years) out of which males numbered 64,642 (77.41% of the male population over 6 years) and females numbered 50,357 (63.74% of the female population over 6 years). The gender disparity (the difference between female and male literacy rates) was 13.67%.

See also – List of West Bengal districts ranked by literacy rate

Literacy in CD blocks of
Birbhum district
Rampurhat subdivision
Murarai I – 55.67%
Murarai II – 58.28%
Nalhati I – 69.83%
Nalhati II – 71.68%
Rampurhat I – 73.29%
Rampurhat II – 70.77%
Mayureswar I – 71.52%
Mayureswar II – 70.89%
Suri Sadar subdivision
Mohammad Bazar – 65.18%
Rajnagar – 68.10%
Suri I – 72.75%
Suri II – 72.75%
Sainthia – 72.33%
Dubrajpur – 68.26%
Khoyrasol – 68.75%
Bolpur subdivision
Bolpur Sriniketan – 70.67%
Ilambazar – 74.27%
Labpur – 71.20%
Nanoor – 69.45%
2011 Census: CD Block Wise

Primary Census Abstract Data

=== Language and religion ===
Religion in Rampuarhat II CD block (2011)
Hinduism	51.64%
Islam	48.20%
Other or not stated	0.16%

In the 2011 census, Hindus numbered 96,991 and formed 51.64% of the population in Rampurhat II CD Block. Muslims numbered 90,527 and formed 48.20% of the population. Christians numbered 79 and formed 0.04% of the population. Others numbered 226 and formed 0.12% of the population.

The proportion of Hindus in Birbhum district has declined from 72.2% in 1961 to 62.3% in 2011. The proportion of Muslims in Birbhum district has increased from 27.6% to 37.1% during the same period. Christians formed 0.3% in 2011.

Bengali is the predominant language, spoken by 99.72% of the population.

== Rural poverty ==
As per the BPL household survey carried out in 2005, the proportion of households below the poverty line (BPL) in Rampurhat II CD Block was 53.7%, against 42.3% in Birbhum district. In six CD Blocks – Murarai II, Nalhati II, Rampurhat II, Rampurhat I, Suri II and Murarai I – the proportion of BPL families was more than 50%. In three CD Blocks – Rajnagar, Suri I and Labhpur – the proportion of BPL families was less than 30%. The other ten CD Blocks in Birbhum district were placed in between. According to the District Human Development Report, Birbhum, "Although there is no indication that the share of BPL households is more in blocks with higher share of agricultural labourer, there is a clear pattern that the share of BPL households is more in blocks with disadvantaged population in general and Muslim population in particular." (The disadvantaged population includes scheduled castes, scheduled tribes, and Muslims.)

== Economy ==
=== Livelihood ===
Livelihood
in Rampurhat II CD Block
1. Cultivators (14.0%)
2. Agricultural labourers (57.3%)
3. Household industries (7.08%)
4. Other Workers (21.6%)

In Rampurhat II CD Block in 2011, amongst the class of total workers, cultivators numbered 9,093 and formed 14.03%, agricultural labourers numbered 37,122 and formed 57.30%, household industry workers numbered 4,590 and formed 7.08% and other workers numbered 13,985 and formed 21.59%. Total workers numbered 64,790 and formed 34.50% of the total population, and non-workers numbered 123,033 and formed 65.50% of the population.

Note: In the census records a person is considered a cultivator, if the person is engaged in cultivation/ supervision of land owned by self/government/institution. When a person who works on another person’s land for wages in cash or kind or share, is regarded as an agricultural labourer. Household industry is defined as an industry conducted by one or more members of the family within the household or village, and one that does not qualify for registration as a factory under the Factories Act. Other workers are persons engaged in some economic activity other than cultivators, agricultural labourers and household workers. It includes factory, mining, plantation, transport and office workers, those engaged in business and commerce, teachers, entertainment artistes and so on.

=== Infrastructure ===
There are 91 inhabited villages in Rampurhat II CD Block, as per District Census Handbook, Birbhum, 2011. 100% villages have power supply. 91 villages (100%) have drinking water supply. 18 villages (19.78%) have post offices. 87 villages (95.00%) have telephones (including landlines, public call offices and mobile phones). 28 villages (30.77%) have a pucca (paved) approach road and 37 villages (40.66%) have transport communication (includes bus service, rail facility and navigable waterways). 5 villages (5.49%) have agricultural credit societies and 9 villages (9.89%) have banks.

=== Agriculture ===
Following land reforms land ownership pattern has undergone transformation. In 2004-05 (the agricultural labourer data is for 2001), persons engaged in agriculture in Rampurhat II CD Block could be classified as follows: bargadars 2,361 (5.56%), patta (document) holders 4,181 (9.85%), small farmers (possessing land between 1 and 2 hectares) 7,000 (16.49%), marginal farmers (possessing land up to 1 hectare) 7,000 (16.49%) and agricultural labourers 21,908 (51.61%).

Birbhum is a predominantly paddy cultivation-based agricultural district. The area under paddy cultivation in 2010-11 was 249,000 hectares of land. Paddy is grown in do, suna and sali classes of land. There is double to triple cropping system for paddy cultivation. Other crops grown in Birbhum are gram, masuri, peas, wheat, linseed, khesari, til, sugarcane and occasionally cotton. 192,470 hectares of cultivable land is under irrigation by different sources, such as canals, tanks, river lift irrigation and different types of tubewells. In 2009-10, 158,380 hectares were irrigated by canal water. There are such major irrigation projects as Mayurakshi and Hijli. Other rivers such as Ajoy, Brahmani, Kuskurni, Dwaraka, Hingla and Kopai are also helpful for irrigation in the district.

In 2013-14, there were 89 fertiliser depots, 7 seed stores and 55 fair price shops in Rampurhat II CD block.

In 2013-14, Rampurhat II CD block produced 148,097 tonnes of Aman paddy, the main winter crop, from 44,844 hectares, 18,407 tonnes of Boro paddy (spring crop) from 5,212 hectares, 12,823 tonnes of wheat from 3,921 hectares, 4,638 tonnes of potatoes from 371 hectares and 7,282 tonnes of sugar cane from 82 hectares. It also produced pulses and oilseeds.

In 2013-14, the total area irrigated in Rampurhat II CD block was 14,200 hectares, out of which 9,500 hectares were irrigated by canal water, 1,400 hectares by tank water and 3,300 hectares by deep tube wells.

=== Banking ===
In 2013-14, Rampurhat II CD block had offices of 7 commercial banks and 2 gramin banks.

=== Other sectors ===
According to the District Human Development Report, 2009, Birbhum is one of the most backward districts of West Bengal in terms of industrial development. Of the new industrial projects set-up in West Bengal between 1991 and 2005, only 1.23% came to Birbhum. Bakreshwar Thermal Power Station is the only large-scale industry in the district and employs about 5,000 people. There are 4 medium-scale industries and 4,748 registered small-scale industries.

The proportion of workers engaged in agriculture in Birbhum has been decreasing. According to the District Human Development Report, “more people are now engaged in non-agricultural activities, such as fishing, retail sales, vegetable vending, selling milk, and so on. As all these activities are at the lower end of the spectrum of marketable skills, it remains doubtful if these activities generate enough return for their family’s sustenance.”

=== Backward Regions Grant Fund ===
Birbhum district is listed as a backward region and receives financial support from the Backward Regions Grant Fund. The fund, created by the Government of India, is designed to redress regional imbalances in development. As of 2012, 272 districts across the country were listed under this scheme. The list includes 11 districts of West Bengal.

== Transport ==
Rampurhat II CD block has 8 originating/ terminating bus routes. The nearest railway station is 8 km from the CD block headquarters.

Margram is on Rampurhat-Margram-Sherpur Road. Tarapith is linked to NH 14.

== Culture ==
Tarapith, a Shakta pitha, attracts 1.4 million visitors annually.

== Education ==
In 2013-14, Rampurhat II CD block had 118 primary schools with 11,795 students, 12 middle schools with 357 students, 12 high schools with 8,652 students and 7 higher secondary schools with 10,618 students. Rampurhat II CD Block had 2 technical/ professional institutions with 200 students and 273 institutions for special and non-formal education with 12,652 students.

As per the 2011 census, in Rampurhat II CD Block, amongst the 91 inhabited villages, 2 villages did not have a school, 30 villages had more than 1 primary school, 28 villages had at least 1 primary and 1 middle school and 21 villages had at least 1 middle and 1 secondary school. 6 villages had senior secondary schools.

== Healthcare ==
In 2014, Rampurhat II CD block had 1 rural hospital and 3 primary health centres with total 60 beds and 5 doctors (excluding private bodies). It had 28 family welfare subcentres. 914 patients were treated indoor and 85,844 patients were treated outdoor in the hospitals, health centres and subcentres of the CD block.

As per 2011 census, in Rampurhat II CD Block, 4 villages had community health centres, 4 villages had primary health centres, 52 villages had primary health subcentres, 1 village had a maternity and child welfare centre, 1 village had a veterinary hospital, 6 villages had medicine shops and out of the 91 inhabited villages 33 villages had no medical facilities.

Category	Hospital Name	Post Office	Beds
Primary Health Centre	Tarapur PHC	Tarapur	6
Primary Health Centre	Margram PHC	Margram	10
Primary Health Centre	Dunigram PHC	Dunigram	6
Rural Hospital	Baswa RH	Baswa	30
