= Culture of Birbhum =

Culture of Birbhum refers to the culture of Birbhum district in the Indian state of West Bengal.

Birbhum is known not only for its red soil and the shallow serpentine rivers ridden with sand islands, but also for the notable poets. Many poets belonging to the age of Vaishnava Padabali and Shakta Padabali of Bengali poetry were born here, as for example, Jaydeb, the celebrated author of Geetagovinda, and Chandidas (Rami).

The bauls of Birbhum, their philosophy and their songs form a notable representation of the folk culture of the district. Baulism is a religiously liberal philosophy and lifestyle which might have some links to Sahajiya movement of 16th century (derived from Sahajyan, a form of Vajrayana Buddhism, influenced also by Vaishnavism and Sufism). Chandidas and many other poets were part of the Sahajiya movement. The bauls earn their living by singing and collecting alms. They accommodate people from any caste and creed. Poet Rabindranath Tagore was inspired by their philosophy. Birbhum has also been home to famous kabiyals, kirtaniyas and other folk culture groups.

Birbhum has a number of other major attractions. The temple and hot spring at Bakreshwar is famous and draws in pilgrims from far and near. Tarapith attracts pilgrims throughout the year. Birbhum has many old temples, such as the ones at Jaydev Kenduli, Surul and Nanoor, with delicate decorative tiles made of terra cotta (burnt clay). Patharchapuri contains the tomb of Data Mehboob Shah, a Sufi Pir. It sees pilgrims, mostly Muslims but some Hindus as well, all through the year.

== Fairs and festivals ==
The numerous fairs of Birbhum starts with Poush Mela, beginning on the 7th day of the month of Poush at Santiniketan and at Dwarbasini on the day of Makar Sankranti follows through the Bengali month of Poush (spread across December and January) till Makar Sankranti. Particularly lively is the fair at Jaydev Kenduli, with the participation of bauls, the itinerant singers, in large numbers.

Festivities have varied with the seasons. Nagar sankirtan is popular in the month of Baisakh, and so is worshipping of Manasa in the month of Shravan. Durga Puja and Kali Puja is celebrated in Ashvin. Aghrayan sees Nabanna and Falgun has Dol. These are just examples of Hindu festivities. Eid-ul-Fitr and Eid-ul-Adha (Bakri-eid, locally) are prominent Muslim festivities in this district. During Ramadan month Muslims fast. On the Day of Ashura during the month of Muharram, processions are taken out to commemorate the deaths of Hassan and Hussein, the grandsons of Muhammad.

Many of the festivals and religious rituals in Birbhum, even though universal among most of the rest of greater Bengal, has some local specialities. For example, in the Durga puja the closing ceremony involves "Baich khela" which is a competition of circumscribing the village by men carrying on their shoulder the whole idol of goddess Durga and her companion icons on bamboo supports accompanied by many petromax lamps ("hajak light" in the local jargon), dhak beat, firecrackers and fanfare. The next day (ekadashi i.e. the eleventh lunar day) evening all the devotees go around in an event called "laru kurano" (meaning: picking up sweet cakes called naru). This event is marked by a representative group of these households visiting houses of all the relatives and acquaintances in the village with a plastic bag. At every home they are given sweetcakes which they collect and bring home, thus exchanging sweet cakes along with sweet greetings at least on this day of the year.

People of Birbhum patronise folk entertainment programmes such as jatra, kavigan, raibenshe and alkap. They often travel long distances to watch jatra overnight, and return home next morning.

== Gramadevata ==
In addition to being a confluence of Vaishnava, Shakta and Saiva cultures, Birbhum villages also observe prehistoric customs like the worship of a gramadevata (gram means village and devta means deity) in many forms at different places.

One form of gramadevata popular in villages of Birbhum is Dharmathakur, symbolized by a stone, worshipped mainly by Bauri, Bagdi, Hari, Dom, etc. castes. In some places there are festivals called Dharmer Gajan. According to some authorities, these are transformed old deities and totems which continued even after these castes accepted Buddhism as a result of the oppression by the higher castes. Later on these old deities were equated to either Shiva or Buddha.

Another gramadevata is the goddess of snakes - Manasa who might have been a transformation of the feminine snake totem to a form more acceptable to later society. Now Goddess Manasa is worshiped for protection from snake bite. Vajrayana Buddhists had an equivalent of Manasa named Janguli. In Manasamangal, the house made for Lakhinder was on top of Santhali mountains, which might have been a reference to Santhal Pargana which was historically a part of Birbhum.
