= Tarapith Rampurhat Development Authority =

Metropolitan authority in West Bengal, India

Tarapith Rampurhat Development Authority (T R D A)
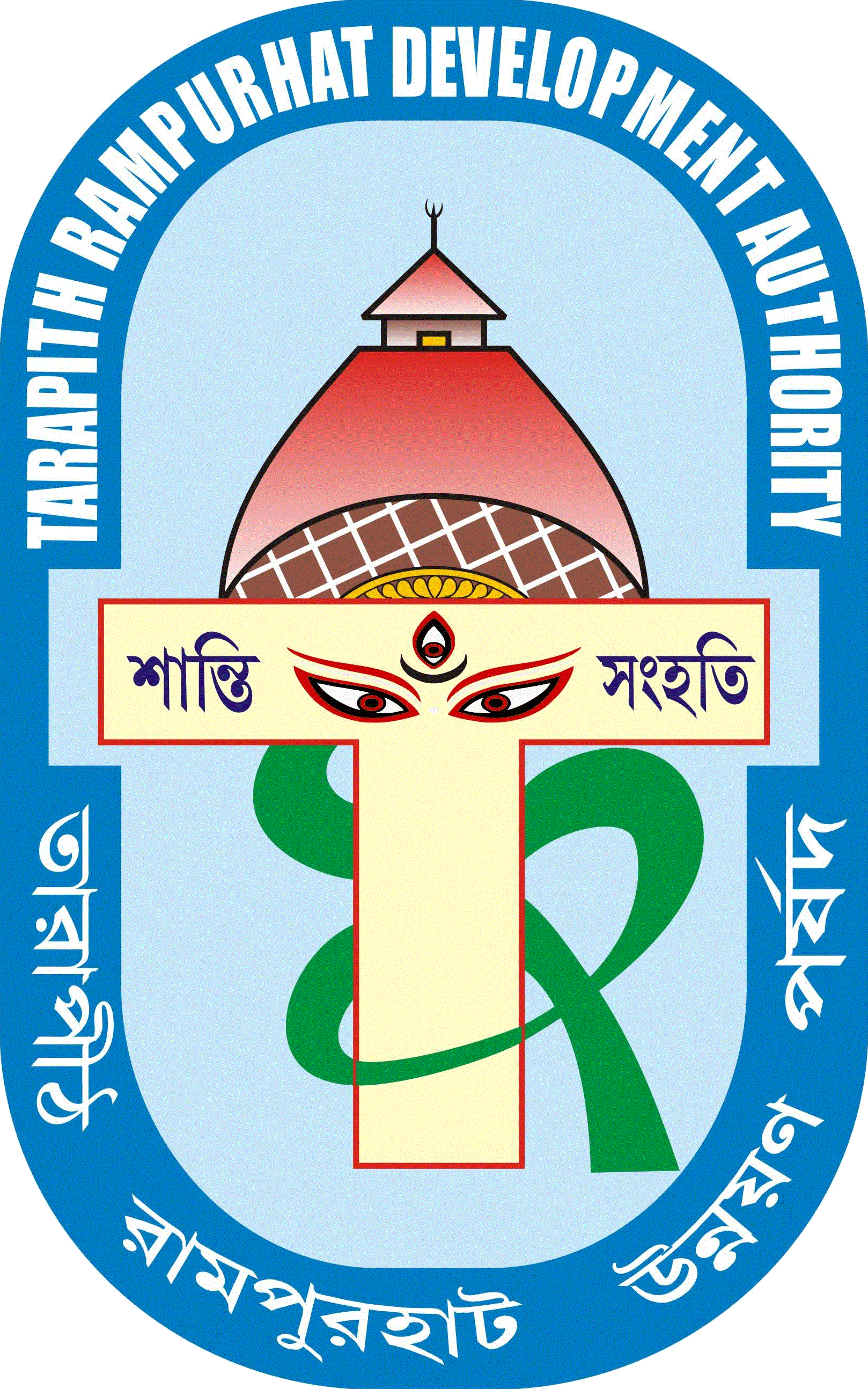
- Official Logo of T R D A

Agency overview
- Formed: 2015; 11 years ago
- Type: City Planning Agency
- Jurisdiction: Government of West Bengal
- Headquarters: Tarapith, West Bengal 731233
- Minister responsible: Firhad Hakim, Minister-In-Charge Department of Urban Development and Municipal Affairs
- Agency executive: Shri. Saurav Pandey, I.A.S, Chief Executive Officer
- Parent agency: Urban Development and Municipal Affairs Department
- Website: Official website

The Tarapith Rampurhat Development Authority (TRDA) is the statutory body responsible for planning and development in the Maa Tara temple area at Tarapith and the Rampurhat city region in West Bengal, India. It was formed in 2015 and works under the Department of Urban Development and Municipal Affairs, Government of West Bengal.

The TRDA office is situated in the Birbhum Zilla Parishad Building, near Tarapith Police Station, P.O. Tarapith, District Birbhum, PIN – 731233.

== History ==
The Tarapith Rampurhat Development Authority (TRDA) was formed in 2015 to oversee the development of the Rampurhat Municipality and 56 mouzas as its designated planning area. It was officially notified by the Urban Development and Municipal Affairs Department, Government of West Bengal, through Notification No. 647-T&CP/C-2/2C-03/15, dated 25.03.2015. The planning area covers 56 mouzas under the Rampurhat Police Station and Margram Police Station, including the Rampurhat Municipality. This declaration was made via Notification No. 646-T&CP/C2/2C-03/15, dated 25.03.2015.

To support the overall development of the temple town, the planning area was later expanded to include 20 additional mouzas, such as Birchandrapur, Dabuk, and Budigram. These mouzas fall under the jurisdictions of Tarapith Police Station and Mallarpur Police Station. This expansion was approved during the 20th General Body Meeting (GBM) of TRDA to maintain geographical continuity and promote religious and cultural growth in the region.

== Area Coverage ==
The areas covered by the agency include:

- Rampurhat Municipality
- Kharun, Barsal, Dokhalbati, Kusumba, and Ayas Gram Panchayat under Rampurhat Police Station.
- Sahapur and Budigram Gram Panchayat under Margram Police Station.
- Budhigram Gram Panchayat under Tarapith Police Station.
- Dabuk Gram Panchayat under Mallarpur Police Station.

The total population under the jurisdiction of the authority, as per the 2011 Census, is 166,907.

== Key Functions and Initiatives for Tarapith Temple ==
Sanitation and Cleanliness: The agency has appointed a Garbage Cleaning Agency to maintain hygiene in areas surrounding the Maa Tara Temple and along the Dwarka River. The authority supervises garbage collection from hotels, lodges, guest houses, and shops, aiming to ensure cleanliness in this pilgrimage hub.

Plastic-Free Zone Campaign: The agency has been actively working to raise awareness about plastic pollution among pilgrims and visitors. It aims to create a plastic-free zone within a 2 km radius of the Maa Tara Temple.

Infrastructure Development:

Riverbank Protection: Proposals have been made for boulder fitting along the Dwarka River banks to enhance their beauty and prevent flooding.

Sewage and Effluent Treatment Plants: The authority is working on establishing a Sewage Treatment Plant (STP) and an Effluent Treatment Plant (ETP) near Tarapith Samsan. These projects are currently in progress, with funding support from the Urban Development & Municipal Affairs Department. The ETP is operational, while the STP is nearing completion after resolving technical issues

Solar Community Kitchen: A solar-powered kitchen was constructed in the Maa Tara Temple premises to make the “Bhog Ghar” pollution-free. It is now operational under the temple committee's management.

Waste Management:TRDA has identified land for garbage dumping near Tarapith after resolving disputes with local communities. This ensures sustainable waste disposal for years to come.

== Notable projects ==
- The agency has completed a project called Tarabitan Tourism Property'near the Rampurhat Circuit House.
- TRDA is working on a project to set up a 100-seat Auditorium in Tarapith.
- The authority aims to build temples based on the models of the 51 Shakti Peeths located across the country.

== See also ==
- Kolkata Metropolitan Development Authority
- Siliguri Jalpaiguri Development Authority
