= Siliguri Jalpaiguri Development Authority =

Development authority in West Bengal

- Siliguri Jalpaiguri Development Authority
- Official logo of SJDA

Agency overview
- Formed: 1 April 1980
- Type: City Planning Agency
- Jurisdiction: Government of West Bengal
- Headquarters: Tenzing Norgey Road, Siliguri-734003
- Agency executive: Dr. Preeti Goyal, IAS, Chairperson
- Website: https://www.sjda.org/

Siliguri Jalpaiguri Development Authority or SJDA is an urban planning agency serving the cities of Siliguri and Jalpaiguri in West Bengal, India. It was established in 1980 and has been responsible of Planning & Development of the Siliguri - Jalpaiguri Area. It came into existence under the West Bengal Town and Country (Planning & Development) Act 1979 (West Bengal Act - XIII of 1979).

It was founded on 1 April 1980 and B.C. Ghosh was the first Chairman.

== Area Coverage ==
The area covers Jalpaiguri and Siliguri Police Stations and all the mouzas of Phansidewa Police Station and Khoribari Block in the district of Darjeeling excluding the areas declared as reserved or protected Forests.

The area also covers Rajganj Police Station & 14 no. of mouza of Maynaguri Police Station & Kotwali Police Station in the Sadar Sub division of the district of Jalpaiguri along with the West bank of the River Teesta excluding the areas declared as reserved or protected forests.

Mal Municipality and entire Malbazar Block under Mal Police Station is also included.

The total area covered by SJDA is 2222.59 km^{2}. As per 2011 census the population of SJDA was 2.37 million.

== Objective behind SJDA development ==
The main object was Planning & Development. Siliguri Jalpaiguri Planning area as declared by Govt. of West Bengal vide notification no - 1877 - T & CP/1R - 6/1980 dtd. 17.3.1980. SJDA is the nodal agency for planning and development of the Siliguri Jalpaiguri Planning Area (SJPA) and works by Coordinating all departments and agencies.

Main role includes creating infrastructure and real estate development in the region and providing facilities to investors. SJDA's has prepared "Perspective Plan 2025" is a visionary road map for the planned development of the SJPA. It is also proposed to maintain a land bank for investment purposes in and around the area.

== See also ==
- Kolkata Metropolitan Development Authority
- Tarapith Rampurhat Development Authority
