= Rampurhat =

- City and Municipality
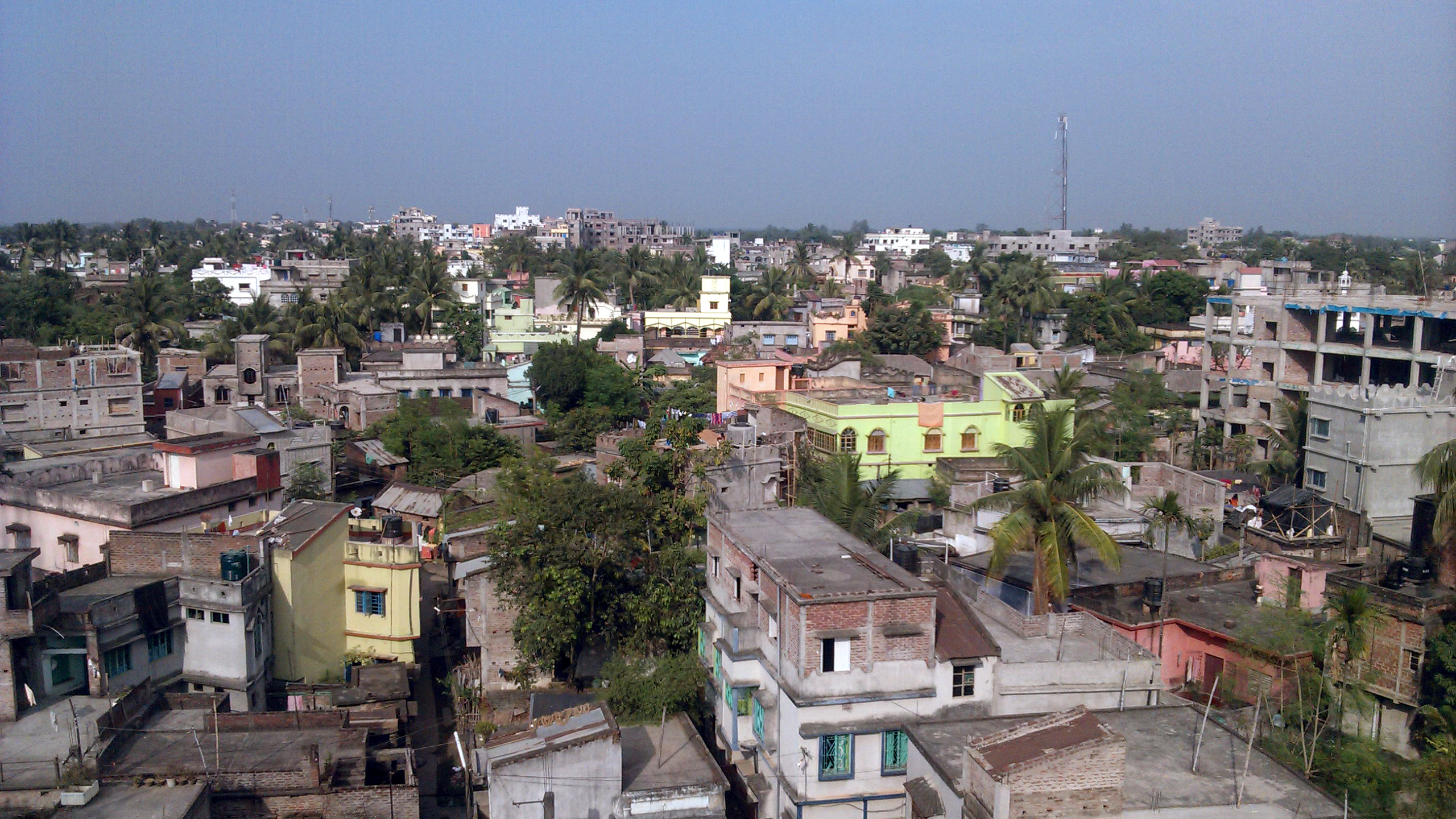
- Aerial view of Rampurhat

- Location in West Bengal, India Rampurhat (India)
- Coordinates: 24.17°N 87.78°E
- Country: India
- State: West Bengal
- District: Birbhum

Government
  - Type: Municipality
  - Body: Rampurhat Municipality; Tarapith Rampurhat Development Authority
  - MP: Satabdi Roy
  - MLA: Dhruba Saha

Area
  - City and Municipality: 16.32 km^{2} (6.30 sq mi)
  - Metro: 95.79 km^{2} (36.98 sq mi)

Population (2011)
  - City and Municipality: 57,833
  - Density: 3,544/km^{2} (9,178/sq mi)
- Time zone: UTC+5:30 (IST)
- PIN: 731224 (Rampurhat Head Post Office)
- Telephone/STD code: +91-03461 (Rampurhat Telephone Exchange)
- Vehicle registration: WB45/WB46 (Rampurhat RTO)
- Lok Sabha constituency: 42, Birbhum
- Vidhan Sabha constituency: Rampurhat, Hansan
- Website: birbhum.gov.in wbtrda.org

Rampurhat is a city in the Birbhum district of West Bengal, India. Rampurhat is the Third largest town in Birbhum. It serves as the administrative headquarters of Rampurhat, the most populous subdivision in the Birbhum district. The city is known for its religious significance, its markets, and the area's natural environment. Rampurhat, located near the West Bengal–Jharkhand border, enjoys excellent connectivity with National Highway 14 passing through the city and Rampurhat Railway Junction being one of the busiest in eastern India.

== Geography ==
Cities and towns in Rampurhat subdivision of Birbhum district.
M: municipal city/ town, CT: census town, R: rural/ urban centre.
Owing to space constraints in the small map, the actual locations in a larger map may vary slightly.

=== Location ===
Rampurhat is located at 24.17 North and 87.78 East.

=== Police station ===
Rampurhat police station has jurisdiction over Rampurhat municipality and Rampurhat I CD Block.

=== CD block HQ ===
The headquarters of Rampurhat I CD block are located at Rampurhat.

=== Overview ===
The northern portion of Rampurhat subdivision (shown in the map alongside) is part of the Nalhati Plains, a sub-micro physiographic region, and the southern portion is part of the Brahmani-Mayurakshi Basin, another sub-micro physiographic region occupying the area between the Brahmani in the north and the Mayurakshi in the south. There is an occasional intrusion of Rajmahal Hills, from adjoining Santhal Parganas, towards the north-western part of the subdivision. On the western side is Santhal Parganas and the border between West Bengal and Jharkhand can be seen in the map. Murshidabad district is on the eastern side. A small portion of the Padma River and the border with Bangladesh (thick line) can be seen in the north-eastern corner of the map. 96.62% of the population of Rampurhat subdivision live in the rural areas and 3.38% live in the urban areas.

Note: The map alongside presents some of the notable locations in the area. All places marked in the map are linked in the larger full screen map.

== Demographics ==
As of the 2011 census Rampurhat had a total population of 57,833, of whom 29,611 were male and 28,222 were female. The literacy rate in Rampurhat city stands at 85.71%, surpassing the state average of 76.26%. Among its residents, the male literacy rate is approximately 90.36%, while the female literacy rate is 80.86%. Scheduled Castes (SC) are 23.69% of the population, and Scheduled Tribes (ST) are 1.95%.

Religions in Rampurhat
Religion	Percent
Hindu	77.83%
Muslim	21.56%
Christian	0.35%
Others	0.27%

== Economics ==
Rampurhat, with "hat" signifying a marketplace, serves as a central hub for local trade and commerce in the region. The principal economic activities are outlined as follows:

Stone quarries and crushing industries

The city is known for its stone quarries and crushing industries, which are vital to the local economy by supplying construction materials and providing jobs, especially for workers in the unorganized sector. This industrial belt employs people from Birbhum District and Santhal Pargana, with around 350 crushers operating in the area. It plays a key role in supplying stone chips throughout West Bengal. Despite its economic benefits, these industries pose environmental concerns, including air pollution and health risks such as Silicosis for workers. On a positive note, the office of the Assistant Labour Commissioner in Rampurhat plays a key role in protecting the legal rights of workers, particularly those in the unorganized sector in stone quarries and crushing industries.

Industrial Park

An industrial park for light industries is planned at Barsal mouza, located along NH-14, within the Rampurhat Urban Node. This project is proposed under Phase I of the TRDA’s development plan.

Agriculture and livestock

Agriculture drives the local economy, with rice, wheat, mustard, and vegetables as the primary crops. Seasonal farming and livestock activities play a significant role in supporting the livelihoods of the rural community. Livestock farming, including the rearing of cattle, goats, and poultry, contributes to both income and the overall economy of the area.

Banking

The city has several nationalized and private banks to support economic growth, including State Bank of India, Union Bank, and Central Bank of India. The Birbhum District Cooperative Bank Ltd. is the oldest bank and plays a role in the success story of the city.

The healthcare sector and tourism also represent key economic drivers in the region.

== Tourism ==
Rampurhat is mainly known for its historical significance, being a major center of several ancient temples, making it a popular destination for tourists and history. Hundreds of hotels were established there for people with religious interest.

- Tarapith is a tourist and pilgrimage destination in West Bengal, attracting a steady stream of devotees throughout the year. Visitors come not only from the state but also from neighboring regions like Bihar, Jharkhand, Odisha, Uttar Pradesh, and Assam. Located 9 km from Rampurhat Railway Station, Tarapith is home to the Maa Tara Temple, a prominent Tantric shrine dedicated to the goddess Tara. This temple holds special significance as one of the 52 Shakti Peethas in India.Tarapith is also closely associated with the revered Tantric saint Bamakhepa, who worshipped at the temple and spent much of his time in the nearby cremation grounds. His ashram, situated on the banks of the Dwarka River, is another spiritual landmark close to the temple. The Tarapith Maha Smashan, a sacred cremation ground near the temple, is famous for its Tantric rituals. A pink-colored temple dedicated to Saint Bamakhepa stands near the Maa Tara Temple. The area is steeped in ancient legends, including the belief that the third eye of Sati fell here, adding to its spiritual significance.
- Ekchakra Dham, situated in Birchandrapur, lies 20 km from Rampurhat Railway Station and 10 km from Tarapith, and holds great spiritual and historical importance. It is the birthplace of Nityananda Rama, a prominent figure in the Gaudiya Vaishnava tradition and a devoted disciple and companion of Chaitanya Mahaprabhu. Born in 1474 CE, Nityananda is venerated alongside Chaitanya Mahaprabhu as Gaura-Nitai, especially at Nabadwip Dham. The Dham is also known for attractions like Mala Tala, Hantugada Tirtha, Pandava Tala, and Bankima Raya Mandira. According to Hindu tradition, Ekchakra Dham is believed to have been a resting place for the five Pandavas during their exile, adding a mythological dimension to its spiritual importance.

Tarabitan Tourism Property, situated in Rampurhat near the Circuit House, is a premier 3-star tourist lodge managed by the West Bengal Tourism Development Corporation (WBTDCL) under the Department of Tourism, Government of West Bengal. It is involved in promoting tourism in the city.

Rampurhat New Town, Rangamati Park and Gandhi Park is another popular local attraction, providing a recreational area especially for children.

== Civic administration ==
The Rampurhat Municipality is responsible for managing all the civic services in the city, ensuring smooth functioning and maintenance. It is structured into 18 distinct wards, each playing a role in organizing and addressing local needs and concerns within the city. The Tarapith Rampurhat Development Authority is a government agency functioning under the Department of Urban Development & Municipal Affairs, Government of West Bengal. Its mission is to improve the quality of life in the city by introducing modern facilities and upgrading the infrastructure for the benefit of the residents.

== Education ==
=== Medical Colleges ===
- Rampurhat Government Medical College and Hospital
- Government College of Nursing, RPHGMCH

=== General Colleges ===
- Rampurhat College (Affiliated to Burdwan University)
- Asleha Girls College

=== Engineering / Management / Polytechnic ===
- Rampurhat Government Polytechnic

=== Teachers Training Centre ===
- Gurukul Teachers Training Centre
- Rampurhat Teachers Training College

=== State Government High Schools ===
- Rampurhat Jitendralal Vidyabhaban (named "Best School" in 2020, estd. 1955)
- Rampurhat High School (oldest school of Rampurhat, estd. 1886)
- Rampurhat Girls' High School (estd. 1900)
- Rampurhat High School for Girls
- Rampurhat Railway Adarsha Vidyamandir
- Hazi Moulabaksh High Madrasah

=== Private Schools ===
- St. Paul's School, Rampurhat (ICSE & ISC affiliated)
- Delhi Public School, Rampurhat (CBSE affiliated)
- The Heritage School (CBSE affiliated)
- St.Xavier's World Public School (CBSE affiliated)
- St Pauls International School (CBSE affiliated)
- Gurukul Public School (CBSE affiliated)

== Healthcare ==
Rampurhat Government Medical College and Hospital (RPHGMCH) is the only and largest tertiary referral government medical institution in Birbhum district. It was upgraded from Rampurhat District Hospital in 2018. The facility features 21 departments and accommodates 626 beds. A 150-bed Mother and Child Hub is currently under construction at the hospital. The Nabarun Urban Health Centre, located at Gandhi Park, provides healthcare services to the residents of Rampurhat city.

The city has many private nursing homes and diagnostic centers, making it an important healthcare hub for the district and the Santhal Pargana region.

Category	Block	Hospital Name	Post Office	Beds
Primary Health Centre	Rampurhat-I	Kastagora PHC	Kastagora	6
Primary Health Centre	Rampurhat-I	Baidara PHC	Haridaspur	10
Primary Health Centre	Rampurhat-I	Udaypur PHC	Dekhuria	6
Primary Health Centre	Rampurhat-I	Narayanpur PHC	Narayanpur	10
Primary Health Centre	Rampurhat-II	Tarapur PHC	Tarapur	6
Primary Health Centre	Rampurhat-II	Margram PHC	Margram	10
Primary Health Centre	Rampurhat-II	Dunigram PHC	Dunigram	6
Block Primary Health Centre	Rampurhat-I	Chakmandala BPHC	Chakmandala	15
Rural Hospital	Rampurhat-II	Baswa RH	Baswa	30
Urban Primary Health Centre	-	Nabarun UPHC (Near Gandhi Park)	Rampurhat	30
Govt. Medical College & Hospital	-	Rampurhat Government Medical College and Hospital (RPHGMCH)	Rampurhat	626
Veterinary Hospital	-	Rampurhat Veterinary Hospital (at Dakbangla Para)	Rampurhat	-

== Culture ==
Rampurhat has a rich tradition of cultural activities, including fairs, circuses and entertainment events for which it is referred to as the “Entertainment Hub of Birbhum”.A number of schools teach music, dance, recitation and drama. Every year during Dol Utsab, a big programme is arranged at Netaji Subhas Muktomancha, involving multiple cultural performance groups. Rabindra Jayanti is celebrated in the town participated by many cultural groups from different localities. During Saraswati Puja, cultural programmes are organized in the schools. The local tribal people, mostly Santhals, frequently arrange for programmes representing their cultural aspects.

== Food ==
Rampurhat is celebrated for its signature dessert, ras malai, known for its rich, creamy texture and delightful taste. Over time, it has earned a special place in the culinary traditions of the region, gaining popularity and recognition throughout the state.

== Transport ==
Mode of Transport		Details
Roadway	SBSTC Bus Depot	The city enjoys excellent connectivity through major national highways, including NH 14 and NH 114A. There is a South Bengal State Transport Corporation (SBSTC) bus depot in the city, providing daily government-run bus services to major destinations across West Bengal. The journey from Rampurhat to Kolkata (Esplanade), via Tarapith, Kuli, Futisanko, and Burdwan, takes around 4.5 to 5 hours.These services provide seamless connectivity from Rampurhat to numerous key locations, such as Esplanade, Karunamoyee, Siliguri, Asansol, Durgapur, Balurghat, Berhampore, Krishnanagar, Malda, Raiganj, Lalgola, Bankura, Purulia, Arambagh, Dankuni, Haldia, Jhargram, Falta, Barasat, Garia, Kalyani, Habra, and several other important destinations. Lotus Press More Bus Stand serves as a key stop for all long-route SBSTC, NBSTC & WBTC buses, ensuring convenient access to the city.
Roadway	Rampurhat New Bus Stand & Terminus	It is located adjacent to the SBSTC Depot, serves as a vital hub connecting various parts of the Rampurhat subdivision, including Rajgram, Jajigram, Lohapur, Nalhati and Murarai. It also facilitates travel to other major cities/towns within the region, such as Siuri, Asansol, Durgapur, Kandi, Jangipur, Berhampore, Katwa, and Nabadwip. It is operated by private bus owners.
Roadway	Inter-State Bus Terminus	It is located near Choi phuko at Rampurhat Junction. The terminal offers hourly bus services throughout the day to destinations such as Sikaripara, Dumka, Deoghar and Jasidih. It plays a vital role in improving railway accessibility for the Santhal Parganas region. Private bus operators manage its operations.
Roadway	Rickshaws	E-rickshaws (toto) are a convenient and popular option for traveling around different parts of the city, and paddle rickshaws are also available for those who prefer them. Auto rickshaws are also available, primarily serving as transportation to popular tourist spots such as Tarapith.
Railway	Rampurhat Junction railway station is the seventh busiest railway stations of Eastern Railway zone and it is the largest and busiest railway station of Birbhum district of West Bengal. It is a NSG-3 Category and Class A station. The station is under Howrah railway division is the third busiest station in this division. It is 207 kilometres (shortest route) away from Howrah Junction. Many mail, express, superfast, passenger and MEMU trains pass through and originate from the Rampurhat Junction railway station. Train service are available from Rampurhat to Kolkata, Chennai, Coimbatore, Bengaluru, Hyderabad, New Jalpaiguri, Agartala, Guwahati, Delhi, Surat, Dhanbad, Patna, Ranchi, Visakhapatnam, Thiruvananthapuram, Bhubaneswar, Ernakulam etc. The junction connects Rampurhat with Dumka - Deoghar - Jasidih.	
Airway	Rampurhat Helipad was constructed to provide helicopter services and promote tourism in the area. Indian Air Force's Rampurhat Airbase Station is situated at Surichua near the Jharkhand - Bengal border of the city. It is administered by the Ministry of Defense under the Government of India. This airbase is being included under the UDAN RCS 4.0 scheme to operate as a public and commercial airport, enabling regular public transportation services.The nearest domestic airport is Kazi Nazrul Islam Airport, 87 km away, while Deoghar Airport is 135 km from the city. The Netaji Subhas Chandra Bose Airport in Kolkata is the closest airport for international travel.	

== New Infrastructure - Ring Road ==
To enhance intra-regional mobility in Rampurhat city, plans have been made for the development of a Ring Road encircling the Rampurhat urban node, stretching from Barsal mouza in the south to Batail mouza in the north, designed to bypass regional traffic along the Kharagpur–Morgram Highway. As part of this initiative, a bypass road is also proposed from Barsal mouza to Nischintapur in the west to ease congestion and divert traffic from Dumka Road. A new road from Batail mouza to Dumka Road ( Suricua Air Base) through Boro Pharai, Chakaipur and Kusumba has also been constructed as part of the proposed ring road plan. All roads included in this ring road project are planned to have a uniform width of 30 metres.

== Post office ==
Rampurhat has a delivery head post office, with PIN 731224. Non-delivery sub offices with the same PIN are Mahajanpatty PO, Nischintapur PO and Railpar Birbhum PO.

The post office offers banking services along with an ATM. It also functions as a Passport Seva Kendra.

== Notable residents ==
- Nityananda Prabhu, Religious reformer
- Muhammad Qudrat-i-Khuda, chemist, educationist and writer.
- Bamakhepa, Indian Hindu saint
- Purna Das Baul Samrat, Indian musician and singer
- Surojit Chatterjee, Indian Musician
