= South Bengal State Transport Corporation =

Transport corporation in India

- Founded: 1 August 1963; 63 years ago
- Headquarters: Durgapur, West Bengal, India
- Service area: Southern West Bengal
- Service type: Limited – Stop Service (LS), Express Service, Non – Stop Service, Normal Air – conditioned Service
- Fleet: 898
- Fuel type: Diesel & CNG
- Operator: Ministry of Transport, Government of West Bengal
- Website: sbstc.co.in

South Bengal State Transport Corporation (SBSTC) is a West Bengal state government undertaken transport corporation. It plies buses in South Bengal and other parts of West Bengal to Durgapur and Kolkata. SBSTC owns many depots in West Bengal to station their buses. It is headquartered in Station Road, Durgapur.

By providing link between Jharkhand and West Bengal, it is the backbone of many people residing in the border areas between these two states. It also connects many cities in West Bengal, particularly major cities and towns like Durgapur, Kolkata, Dankuni, Bardhaman, Rampurhat, Arambagh, Krishnanagar, Berhampore, Suri, Purulia, Digha, Medinipur, Bankura, Haldia etc. which extend up to North Bengal.

== Bus/Coaches ==
Manufacturer
Ashok Leyland
Tata
Eicher
Volvo (Coming Soon)

== History ==
The South Bengal State Transport Corporation started its journey on 1 August 1963 in Durgapur industrial township by the Government of West Bengal with an aim to provide a clean and hassle free ride to the people of Durgapur. initially, it started with only 8 buses operated inside the township covering a total route length of 65 km. In 1964–65, the fleet strength increased to 25 with and total operating route length increased to 102 km. In 1965–66, the fleet strength is increased to 62 and route length became 428 km.

On 15 August 1967, it was renamed to "Durgapur State Transport Board (DSTB)".In 1968–69, DSTB extended its activities through augmentation of fleet strength of 100 buses operating in 11 long distance routes and 8 township routes covering a total route length of 1200 km and 176 km respectively. In 1972–73, Durgapur-Siliguri bus service was introduced with 3 new town services and the total route length of long distance and town services went up to 1650 km and 143 km respectively.

In 1973, DSTB was ultimately converted into public sector undertaking under the name and style of " Durgapur State Transport Corporation(DSTC)" and many new routes has been introduced. DSTC got its present name in 1988 with an objective of increasing its service to the entire south Bengal.

== Organizational Set up ==
The Corporation has a three-tier system of management which is, Depot, Division and Corporate. The entire operational network of the Corporation is carried out through its two Divisional headquarters – one located at Durgapur and other at Belghoria. At the Corporate level, the Deputy Managing Director, Chief Accounts Officers and HODs of other discipline assist the Managing Director. At Divisional level, the office is headed by Divisional Managers of the respective Divisions who is assisted by Works Manager or Works In-charge on the technical site, Traffic Manager for traffic and operation, Sr. Administrative Officer and other officers for general administration, Dy. Chief Accounts Officer for accounts matter. The Divisional Managers are directly reporting to the Managing Director. At the depot level, the Depot Manager or Depot In-charge is assisted by senior foremen, foreman or assistant foreman (depending upon the size of the Depot) for repair and maintenance work, Assistant Manager – Administration and Account, for general administration, accounts and disciplinary matters, Assistant Traffic Manager/Traffic Superintendent in the matter of traffic and operation. The Depot Manager or Depot In-charge directly reports to the Divisional Manager.

== Traffic Operational Activities ==
Traffic operational activities of this Corporation which was previously confined to Durgapur and its nearby areas, has been now gradually extended to cover the districts of Burdwan, Bankura, Purulia, Midnapur, North-24 Paraganas, Howrah, Hooghly and Kolkata. At the present, SBSTC operates road transport services from its two Divisional Offices – one at Durgapur and other at Belghoria. It is operated throughout the entire State of West Bengal and covers almost all historical places and tourist points like Digha, Garbeta forest, Bishnupur, Mukutmonipur, Susunia Hill, Kangsabati project, Ajodhya hill, Santiniketan, Mushidabad Hazarduari (Nawab Palace), Tarapit temple, Massanjore dam, Farakka barage, Gour, Nabadwip, Mayapur, Siliguri and Darjeeling, Tarakeswar, Thakurnagar and many more.

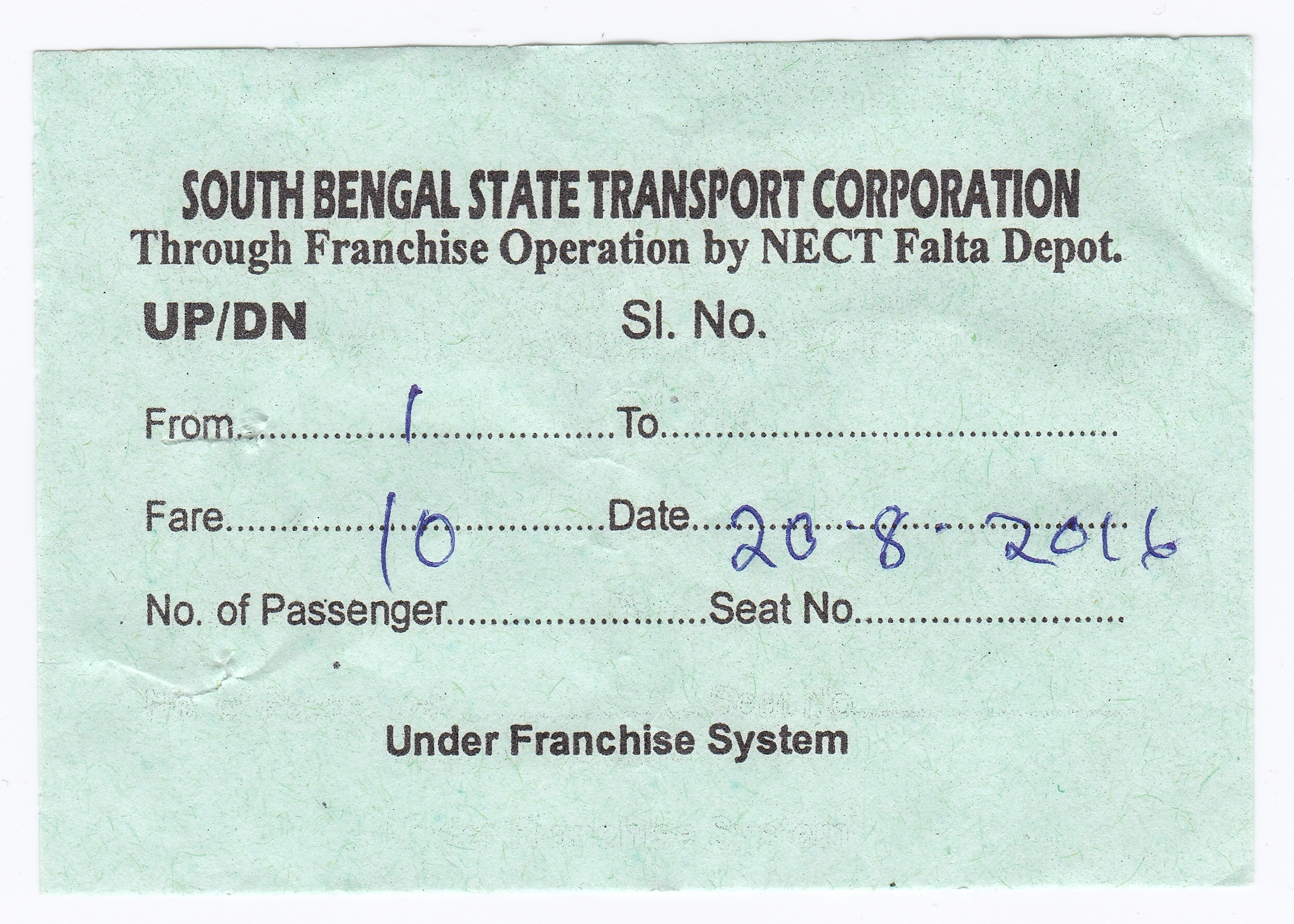
SBSTC bus ticket sample

This Corporation has operations in the inter-State routes like the present link with state of Jharkhand. Some inter-state routes on which the Corporation runs buses are Durgapur to Tata (Jamshedpur) via Bankura and Purulia, and Durgapur to Bokaro Steel City via Asansol and Dhanbad, Durgapur to Dumka via Suri. The Corporation has planned to contact some more areas in more States in the near future.

== Divisions, depots and routes ==
SBSTC provides its services through two divisions, namely Durgapur and Belghoria. It has a total fifteen depots, four bus terminus, two bus counter and one bus stand.

- Services From

Durgapur Division	Belghoria Division
Rampurhat Depot	Belghoria Depot
Katwa Depot	Howrah Depot
Asansol Depot	Falta Depot
Bankura Depot	Haldia Depot
Burdwan Depot	Midnapore Depot
Purulia Depot	Digha Depot
Arambagh Depot	Esplanade Bus Terminus
Kalna Depot	Karunamoyee Bus Terminus
Suri Depot	Jhargram Depot
Durgapur City Centre/ Rail Station Bus Terminus	Santragachi Bus Terminus Garia Bus Depot
Burdwan Stand (Nawabhat)	Bandwan Depot
Asansol Bus Terminus	Krishnanagar Depot
Kudghat Bus Terminus

The list of depots in different years after the inception of SBSTC are as follows:

Year	Depots
1977–78	1
1987–88	4
1988–89	6
1989–90	10
1990–91	11
1995–96	12
1996–97	14
2011–12	15
2014–15	13
2016–17	14

== See also ==
- North Bengal State Transport Corporation
