= Dwarka River =

Coordinates: 24°06′36″N 87°47′56″E

Dwarka River Babla River
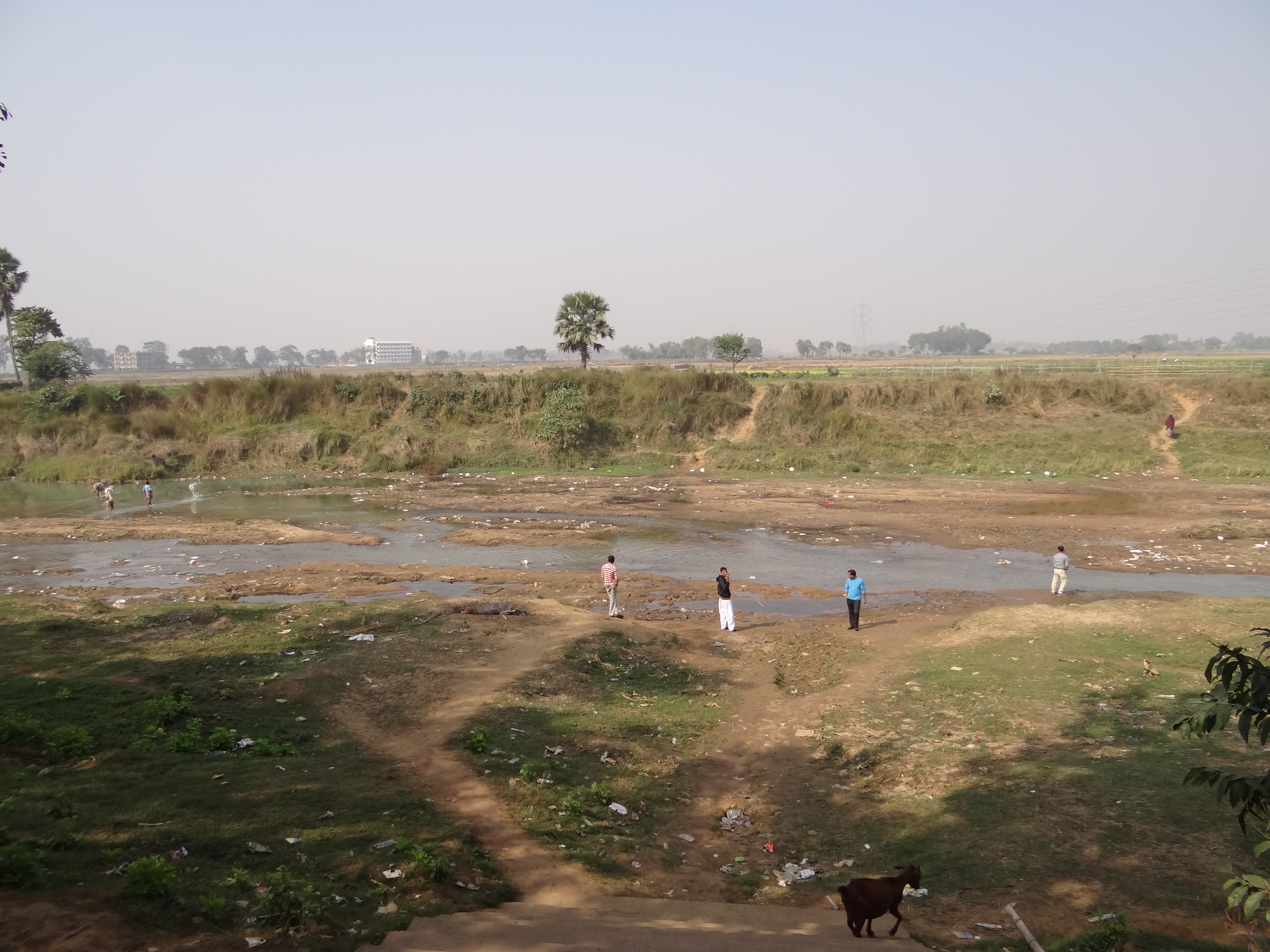
- Native name: দ্বারকা (Bengali)

Location
- Country: India
- State: Jharkhand, West Bengal
- District: Birbhum, Murshidabad
- Cities: Chondrapur, Deucha, Tarapith

Physical characteristics
- Source
  - location: Santhal Parganas, Jharkhand
- Length: 156.5 km (97.2 mi)
- Discharge
  - location: Bhagirathi

Basin features
- Tributaries
  - right: Brahmani

The Dwarka River (also called Babla) is a tributary of Bhagirathi.

== Course ==
The Dwaraka originates in Santhal Parganas in Jharkhand, flows through Deucha, and then through Mayureswar and Rampurhat police station areas of Birbhum district. It finally flows through Murshidabad district, where it joins the Bhagirathi. Total length of Dwarka river is 156.5 km.

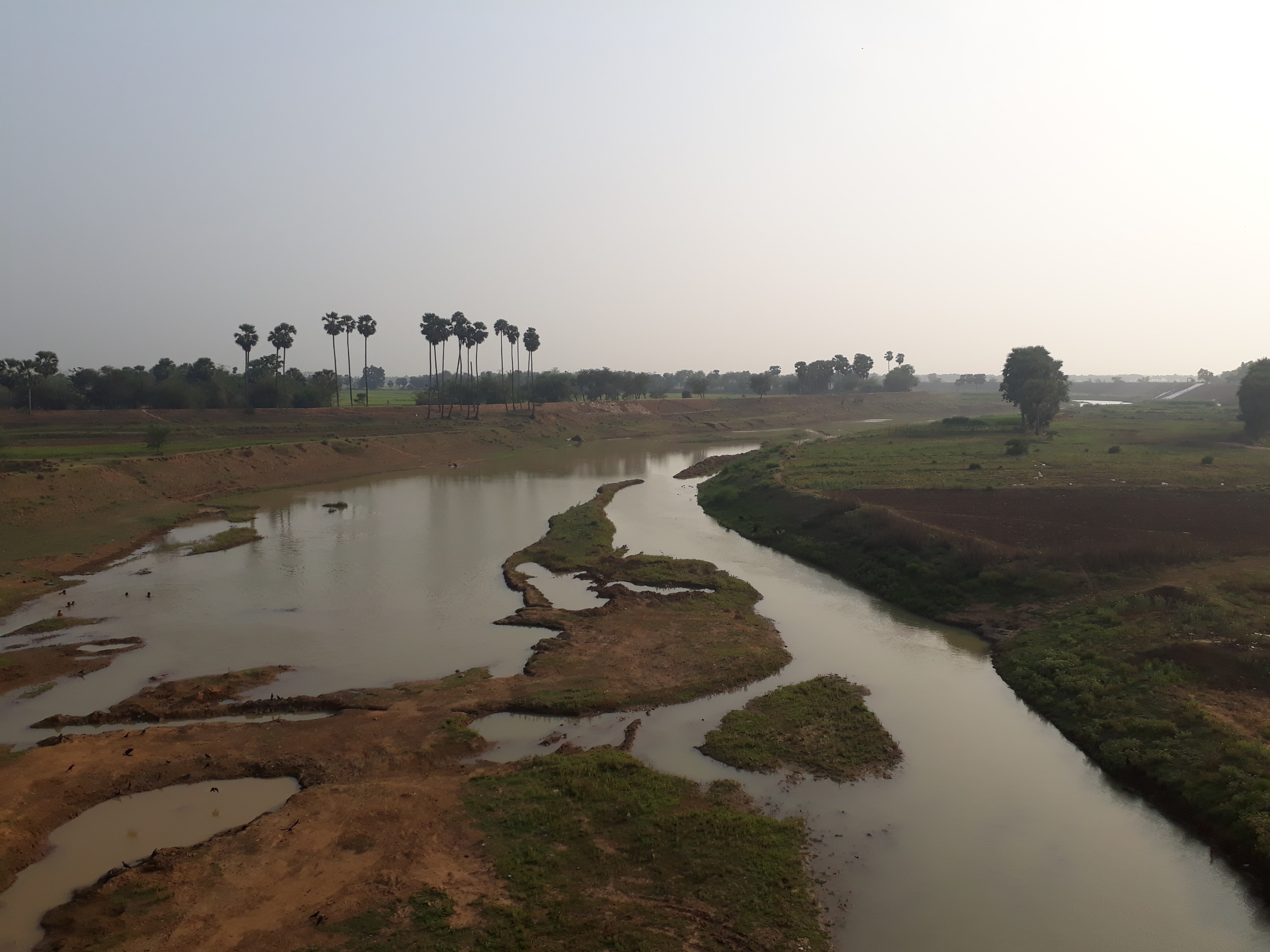
Dwaraka river in Murshidabad District

Though a moderate river, it has several names and many small tributaries and estuaries. It flows through Kandi subdivision and near Kalyanpur (Murshidabad) this river merged with Bhagirathi. Its many backwaters and side channels also connect with the Bhagirathi. It is a hill stream with beds full of pebbles and yellow clay.

== Deucha barrage ==
A barrage at Deucha on the Dwarka river has a capacity of 1,700,000 cubic metres (1,400 acre⋅ft). It is on the west side of NH 60, in Birbhum district.

== See also ==
List of rivers of India
