= Deucha Pachami coal block =

Coal mine in West Bengal, India

Deocha-Pachami Coal Block
- Location in West Bengal
- Location: Deucha, Panchami, West Bengal, India; 23°59′26″N 87°31′27″E
- Company: WBPDCL
- Website: https://www.wbpdcl.co.in/

Deucha Panchami (ডেউচা-পাঁচামি) coal mine or Deaucha Panchami coal block is a coal mine situated in Deucha and Panchamati area under Mohamadbazar community Development Block of Birbhum district, West Bengal, India. This coal mine or block belongs to Birbhum coalfield area. There are about 2170 million tonnes of coal reserves in Deucha Panchami coal block. In terms of coal reserves, it is the largest coal block in India and the second largest in the world. It is the newest coal mine in West Bengal.

== History ==
A total of 17 coal blocks were allocated by the Ministry of Coal in 2015; these included the Deucha-Panchami coal block.

In January 2016, Chief Minister of West Bengal Mamata Banerjee inaugurated the Deucha-Panchamite Coal Mine Project at Joydev-Kenduli. She claimed that the investment in the project would be approximately ₹20,000 crore. At that time, the Ministry of Coal had jointly entrusted West Bengal, Bihar, Punjab, Uttar Pradesh, Karnataka, Tamil Nadu and Sutlej Hydropower Corporation with the responsibility of developing mines in the coal block. However, since other states did not show interest, West Bengal was given the sole responsibility of mining coal from the coal block.

At the 8th Bengal Global Business Summit (BGBS), Chief Minister of West Bengal Mamata Banerjee announced the excavation of the Deucha-Pachami coal block. On February 6, 2025, excavation activities began for the extraction of basalt―the thick rock layer above the deposited coal―on the 326 acres of land identified for the development of the coal mine began.

== Controversy ==
There happens a political agitation between the local Adivasis and ruling All India Trinamool Congress cadres in December 2021. Tribals of the area are against the construction of mine and refused to accept the compensation. As per the news report they fear for eviction and loss of their properties, forest, agricultural land hence they claim that they do not want coal mines in the area. Government officials meet with tribals protesters to resolve the issue. It is also claimed by the administration that CPI (Maoist) sided with the anti coal mine movement.

== Transport ==
=== Railway ===
The nearest important city railway station from this coal mine is Sainthia Junction.

=== Road ===
The Panagarh–Morgram Highway runs above part of this coal block.

== See also ==
- Birbhum coalfield
