= Rampurhat College =

College in Birbhum, West Bengal, established in 1950

- Type: Undergraduate college Public college
- Established: 1950; 76 years ago
- Founder: Mukunda Bihari Saha
- Affiliations: University of Burdwan
- President: Mr. Dhruva Saha
- Principal: Dr Prabal Kumar Sinha
- Location: Dakbanglapara, Rampurhat, West Bengal, 731224, India; 24.1728293°N 87.7803782°E
- Campus: Urban
- Website: rampurhatcollege.ac.in
- Location within West Bengal Location within India

Rampurhat College, established in 1950, is a government affiliated college located at Rampurhat in the Birbhum district of West Bengal. It is affiliated to the University of Burdwan and teaches arts, science and commerce.

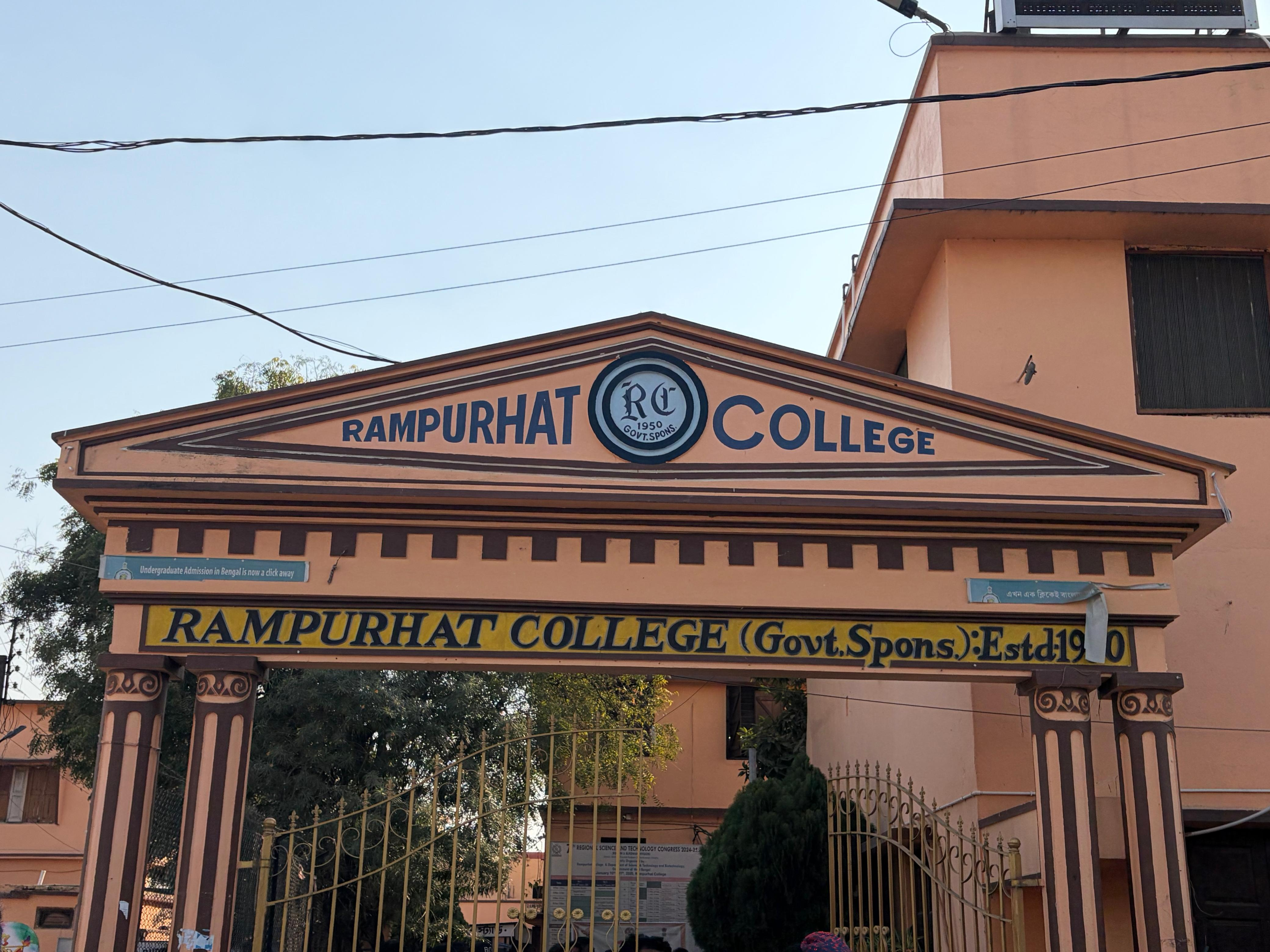
Rampurhat Collage

== History ==
Rampurhat College was established in 1950 by then West Bengal Govt. This college has traversed a long path warding off the challenges of time and put its mark in the history of higher education in the area. This college is affiliated to the University of Burdwan.

== Departments ==
The college offers different undergraduate and postgraduate courses and aims at imparting education to the undergraduates of lower- and middle-class people of Rampurhat and its adjoining areas.

=== Science ===
Science faculty consists of the departments of Chemistry, Physics, Mathematics, Botany, and Zoology.

=== Arts and Commerce ===
Arts & Commerce faculty consists of departments of Bengali, English, Sanskrit, History, Geography, Political Science, Philosophy, Economics, Education, Computer Science, Physical Education and Commerce.

== Accreditation ==
Recently, Rampurhat College has been awarded B grade by the National Assessment and Accreditation Council (NAAC). The college is also recognized by the University Grants Commission (UGC).

== See also ==
- List of institutions of higher education in West Bengal
- Education in India
- Education in West Bengal
- Edrakpur High School
