= Dunigram =

- Village
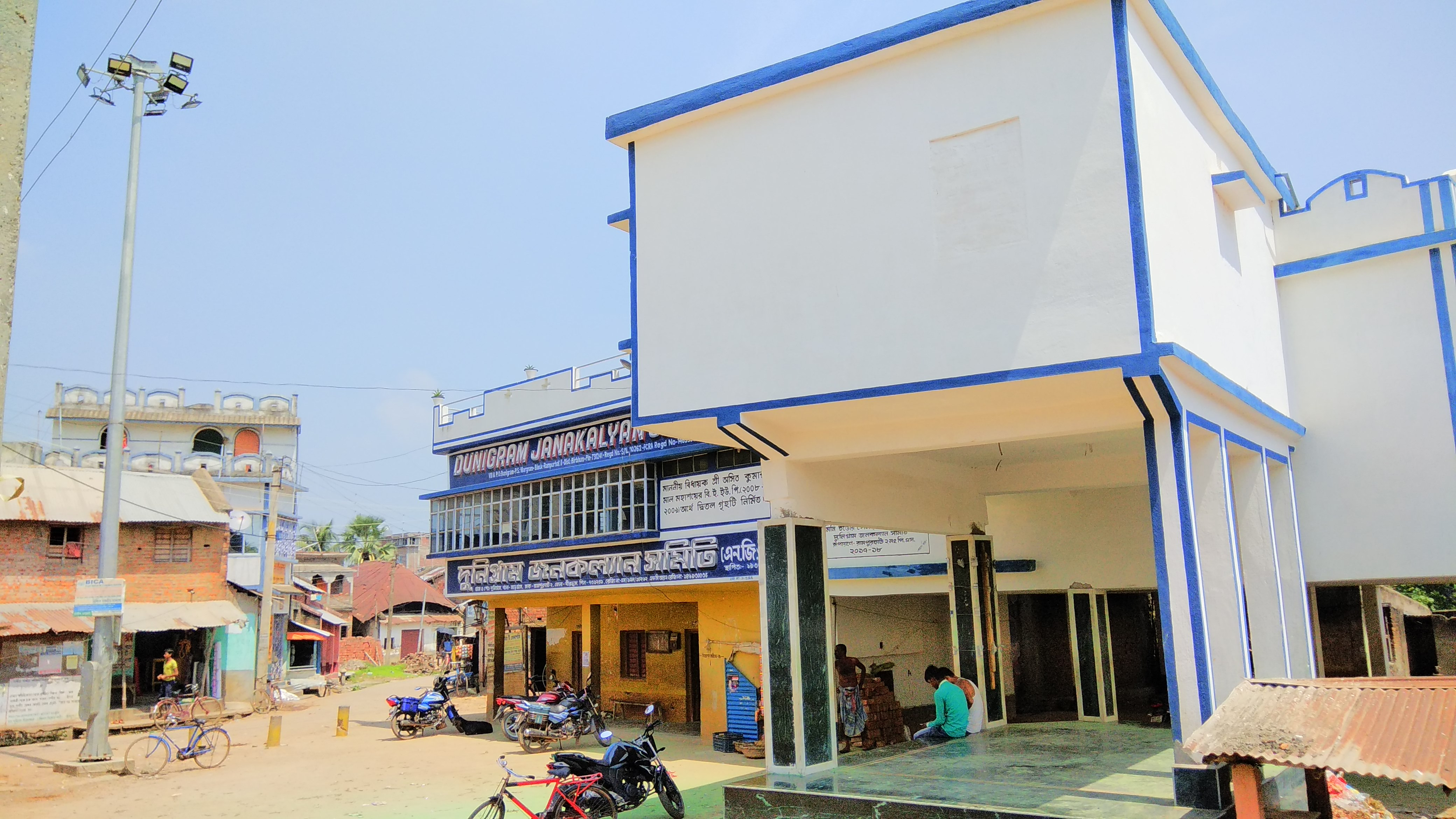
- Nickname: Small township village
- Location in West Bengal, India Dunigram (India)
- Coordinates: 24.221451°N 87.916242°E
- Country: India
- State: West Bengal
- District: Birbhum

Government
  - Type: Gram Panchayat
  - MP: Satabdi Roy
  - MLA: Fayezul Haque

Population (2011)
  - Total: 8,282

Languages
  - Official: Bengali, English, Hindi
- Time zone: UTC+5:30 (IST)
- PIN: 731241 (Dunigram B.O)
- Telephone/STD code: 03461
- ISO 3166 code: IN-WB
- Vehicle registration: WB 46
- Lok Sabha constituency: 42, Birbhum
- Vidhan Sabha constituency: 292, Hansan
- Website: birbhum.nic.in dunigram360.blogspot.com

Dunigram is a village and gram panchayat in Rampurhat II community development block in Rampurhat subdivision of Birbhum district in the Indian state of West Bengal.

== Culture ==
Dunigram Janakalyan Samity a N.G.O Club, established in 1935. This club rules about 80% of the area. Dunigram is also well known for cultural activities. A number of schools teach music, dance, recitation and drama. Every year annual program a big function is arranged in Dunigram Janakalyan Samity, Dunigram Abdul karim High school, primary school, Gram Panchayet and Administration involving multiple cultural performance groups. During Independent, Republic Day and religious festivals (Eid al-Fitr and Eid al-Adha, Holi, Saraswati puja and Durga Puja), etc. cultural programmes are organized in the schools and NGO. Dunigram Janakalyan Samity (Local Level) and state and national level Bangla Sanskrit Mancha is a proactive cultural and social service organization based out of the village. At present, the people of Dunigram are working with the various volunteer organization from district to state level. They are primarily aware and working with people on education health pollution and fighting for society, better nation.

== Transport ==
Dunigram nearly railway station Rampurhat Junction railway station, 15 km Distance. Dunigram is on the Dunigram Road that links NH 14 (know also NH60) at Rampurhat, 13 km Distance.

== Demographics ==
As per the 2011 Census of India, Dunigram had a total population of 8,282 of which 4,295 (52%) were males and 3,987 (48%) were females. Population below 6 years was 1,180. The total number of literates in Dunigram was 4,910 (69.14% of the population over 6 years).

== Post Office ==
Dunigram has a delivery branch post office, with PIN 731241, under Rampurhat head office and Chandpara sub office. Other post offices having the same PIN are Chandpara, Koyemba and Nonadanga.

== Healthcare ==
There is a primary health centre (PHC) with 6 beds at Dunigram.

== See also ==
- Rampurhat
