= Chondrapur =

- Village
- Location in West Bengal, India Chondrapur (India)
- Coordinates: 23.9916°N 87.50425°E
- Country: India
- State: West Bengal
- District: Birbhum

Languages
  - Official: Bengali, English
- Time zone: UTC+5:30 (IST)
- PIN: 731127
- Lok Sabha constituency: Birbhum
- Vidhan Sabha constituency: Rampurhat
- Website: birbhum.nic.in

Chondrapur is a village in the Birbhum district of the Indian state of West Bengal. A temple dedicated to the worship of the Shakti god Dwarbasini is situated in Chondrapur.

== Demographics ==
Chondrapur is a remote village with a population composed of Hindus and tribal groups. It is administrated under the Hinglow gram panchayat. Chondrapur has one primary school, established in 1946. This village is under two mouzas polon and Hinglow.

== Climate ==
This village is made of red soil, that's why it is too hot in summer. It crosses its temperature above 40 °C in April to June. But in winter it becomes so low as 5 - 10 °C. Rainfall is same as whole birbhum district.

== Culture ==
Many festivals occur in Chondrapur. Poush Mela, the main festival of the village, is held at the grounds of a temple dedicated to the Shakti goddess Dwarbasini. During the month of Boisakh (corresponding to April/May), festivals dedicated to the Hindu deities Manasa and Dharmathakur occur.
