= Dwarbasini =

Hindu Goddess

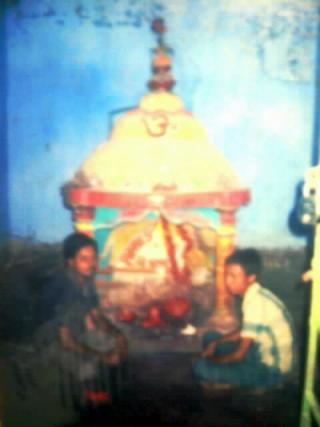

Dwarbasini ("দ্বারবাসিনী") is a Shakti goddess. She is the form of goddess Durga. Dwarbasini is a sini goddess along with Palashbasini and Duarsini. She was worshiped by Santhals, and pahria Mals.

== History ==
From a folk story we get the name of 'Raja Umacharan Roy' (Umeshcharan Sharma), grandson of first priest Triloke Sharma. He was a devotee of the Dwarbasini and died by Santhals at Santhal rebellion. He donated lands to allocate flowers, woods, rices, sweets, milk etc. at the village chondrapur (চন্দ্রপুর).

Stone idol

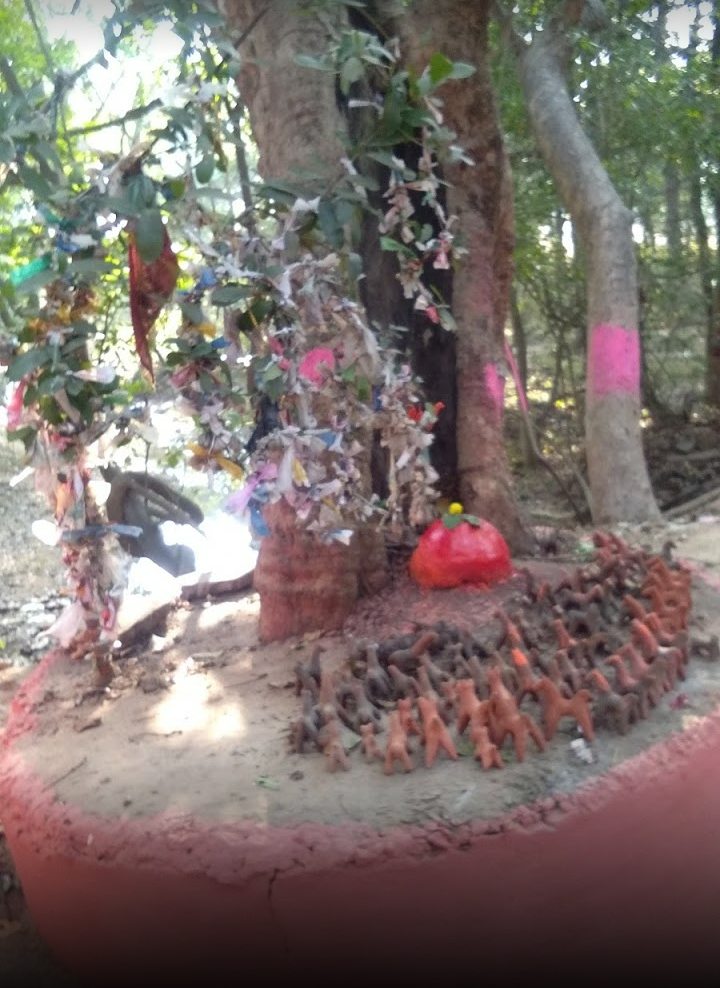
Vairob of dwarbasini

== Origins ==
Goddess Dwarbasini is a stone idol with no image. She is a form of Durga with Laxmi, Saraswati, Kartik, and Ganesha. A Dwarbasini temple is situated on the bank of Dwarka River. This temple was built during the 1990s. Before this temple was made, Dwarbasini was covered with a bamboo umbrella, made by Santhals.
