= Basoa =

Basoa Baswa
- Village
- Location in West Bengal, India Basoa (India)
- Coordinates: 24.147151°N 87.880242°E
- Country: India
- State: West Bengal
- District: Birbhum

Population (2011)
  - Total: 5,511

Languages
  - Official: Bengali, English
- Time zone: UTC+5:30 (IST)
- PIN: 731202 (Baswa)
- Telephone code: 03461
- Lok Sabha constituency: Birbhum
- Vidhan Sabha constituency: Hansan
- Website: birbhum.nic.in

Basoa (also spelled Baswa) is a village in Rampurhat II CD Block in Rampurhat subdivision of Birbhum district in the Indian state of West Bengal

== Geography ==
Cities and towns in Rampurhat subdivision of Birbhum district
M: municipal city/ town, CT: census town, R: rural/ urban centre.
Owing to space constraints in the small map, the actual locations in a larger map may vary slightly

=== Location ===
Basoa is located at 24.147151°N 87.880242°E.

=== Overview ===
The northern portion of Rampurhat subdivision (shown in the map alongside) is part of the Nalhati Plains, a sub-micro physiographic region, and the southern portion is part of the Brahmani-Mayurakshi Basin, another sub-micro physiographic region occupying the area between the Brahmani in the north and the Mayurakshi in the south. There is an occasional intrusion of Rajmahal Hills, from adjoining Santhal Parganas, towards the north-western part of the subdivision. On the western side is Santhal Parganas and the border between West Bengal and Jharkhand can be seen in the map. Murshidabad district is on the eastern side. A small portion of the Padma River and the border with Bangladesh (thick line) can be seen in the north-eastern corner of the map. 96.62% of the population of Rampurhat subdivision live the rural areas and 3.38% of the population live in the urban areas.

Note: The map alongside presents some of the notable locations in the area. All places marked in the map are linked in the larger full screen map.

== Demographics ==
As per the 2011 Census of India, Basoa had a total population of 5,511 of which 2,873 (52%) were males and 2,638 (48%) were females. Population below 6 years was 590. The total number of literates in Basoa was 3,529 (71.71% of the population over 6 years).

== Transport ==
Basoa is on the Rampurhat-Sherpur Road that links NH 14 at Rampurhat to SH 7 at Sherpur.

== Post Office ==
Baswa has a delivery sub post office, with PIN 731202, under Rampurhat head office. Branch offices using the same PIN are situated at Barakartickchungri, Dakhalbati, Joykrishnapur, Kaluha, Laha, Mallickpur, Margram and Ningha.

== Culture ==
Binoy Smriti Pathagar, a government-sponsored library at Baswa, was established in 1980. It has its own pucca building.

== Healthcare ==
Baswa Rural Hospital at Baswa has 30 beds.
