= Muhammad Qudrat-i-Khuda =

Bangladeshi chemist

Muhammad Qudrat-A-Khuda
- মুহাম্মাদ কুদরাত-এ-খুদা
- Born: 1 December 1900; Margram, Birbhum District, Bengal Presidency, British India
- Died: 3 November 1977 (aged 76); Dhaka, Bangladesh
- Citizenship: British Indian (1900-47); Pakistani (1947–71); Bangladeshi (1971–77)
- Education: Presidency College; London University
- Awards: full list

Muhammad Qudrat-A-Khuda (1 December 1900 – 3 November 1977) was a Bangladeshi organic chemist, educationist and writer. He is most notable for publishing Qudrat-a-Khuda Education Commission Report in 1973 as a chairman of the National Education Commission of the newly independent country of Bangladesh. He founded the Bangladesh Council of Scientific and Industrial Research (BCSIR).

== Early life and education ==
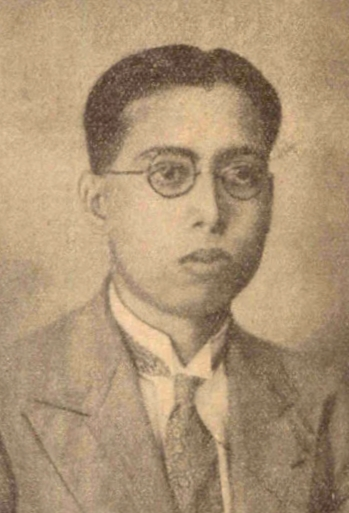
Qudrat c. 1931

Qudrat was born on 1 December 1900 to Syed Shah Sufi Khondokar Abdul Mukid and Syeda Fasia Khatun in Margram, Birbhum in the then Bengal Presidency, British India (in present-day West Bengal, India). Mukid was a graduate from the University of Calcutta and later became a religious leader. He was a follower of a pir in Taltala, Calcutta who named his son, Qudrat-A-Khuda.

Qudrat received his early education in an Anglo-Oriental M.E. school (now Margram High School) established in 1881. In 1909/1910, he was sent to Calcutta to study. He passed the matriculation exam from Woodburn School (then a branch of Calcutta Madrasa and now Government Woodburn M. E. School) in 1918. He took admission to Presidency College, Calcutta where he was a student of Prafulla Chandra Ray who is considered the Father of Indian Chemistry. After his six years of study he earned his master's degree in chemistry in 1925.

Failing to obtain a scholarship for higher studies from the University of Calcutta, he earned another one with the help of Sir Abdur Rahim. He then went to London University to work under the supervision of Jocelyn Field Thorpe. He was awarded with a Doctor of Science degree in 1929 for his work entitled "Stainless Configuration of Multiplanmet Ring" in the field of ring-chain tautomerism of carbohydrates.

== Career ==
=== British India ===
Returning from London, Qudrat joined Presidency College at the Department of Chemistry as a lecturer in 1931, later became a professor and then the head of the department in 1936. He then served as the principal of Islamia College (now Maulana Azad College) in Calcutta during 1942-1944. He rejoined Presidency College in 1946 as its principal. He was a fellow and a member of the senate of University of Calcutta.

=== Pakistan ===
After the partition of India in 1947, Qudrat migrated to East Pakistan and served at the Department of Public Education of East Pakistan until 1949. He had opposed the enforcement of Urdu language in the public schools. He was the scientific advisor to the central government of Pakistan during 1950–1953 and represented the country in international scientific conferences. During 1953–1954, he was the chairman of the Board of Secondary Education of East Pakistan. Pakistan Council of Scientific & Industrial Research (PCSIR) was founded in 1953. In January 1955, Qudrat took initiative to found East Regional Laboratories as a branch in the premises of Dhaka Polytechnic Institute (DPI) in Tejgaon, Dhaka. This laboratory later became Bangladesh Council of Scientific and Industrial Research and headquartered at Dhanmondi, Dhaka, now colloquially known as Science Laboratory. He served as its director until 1966.

Qudrat served as the president of Bangla Academy during 1964–1965. He was then the chairman of Central Board for the Development of Bengali until 1968. From 1969 till 1972, Qudrat served as the president of Pakistan Academy of Sciences. He was also a foundational fellow of the organization.

=== Bangladesh ===
After the independence of Bangladesh in 1971, the newly established government of Bangladesh created an education commission on 26 July 1972. The commission visited India for a month. After analysing, combining, adding, synthesizing Qudrat's experience in public education, and many other opinions, the commission submitted a 450-page report to the then president Sheikh Mujibur Rahman on 8 June 1973. The report proposed to increase government spending on education to at least 25 percent, make primary education compulsory and free up to the eighth grade, introduce Bengali at all levels of education, give special importance to science and agricultural education, expand technical and engineering education, form a manpower commission, appoint the most qualified people as teachers and establish their salary structure at the highest level.

In 1973, he was elected as the founder president of Bangladesh Academy of Sciences. He served as a visiting professor of chemistry at the University of Dhaka from 1975 until his death in Dhaka on 3 November 1977.

== Awards ==
Qudrat was awarded the top civilian awards from Pakistan – Tamgha-e-Pakistan and Sitara-e-Imtiaz and also from Bangladesh – Ekushey Padak in 1976 and Independence Day Award in 1984 (posthumously).

== Memorials and eponyms ==
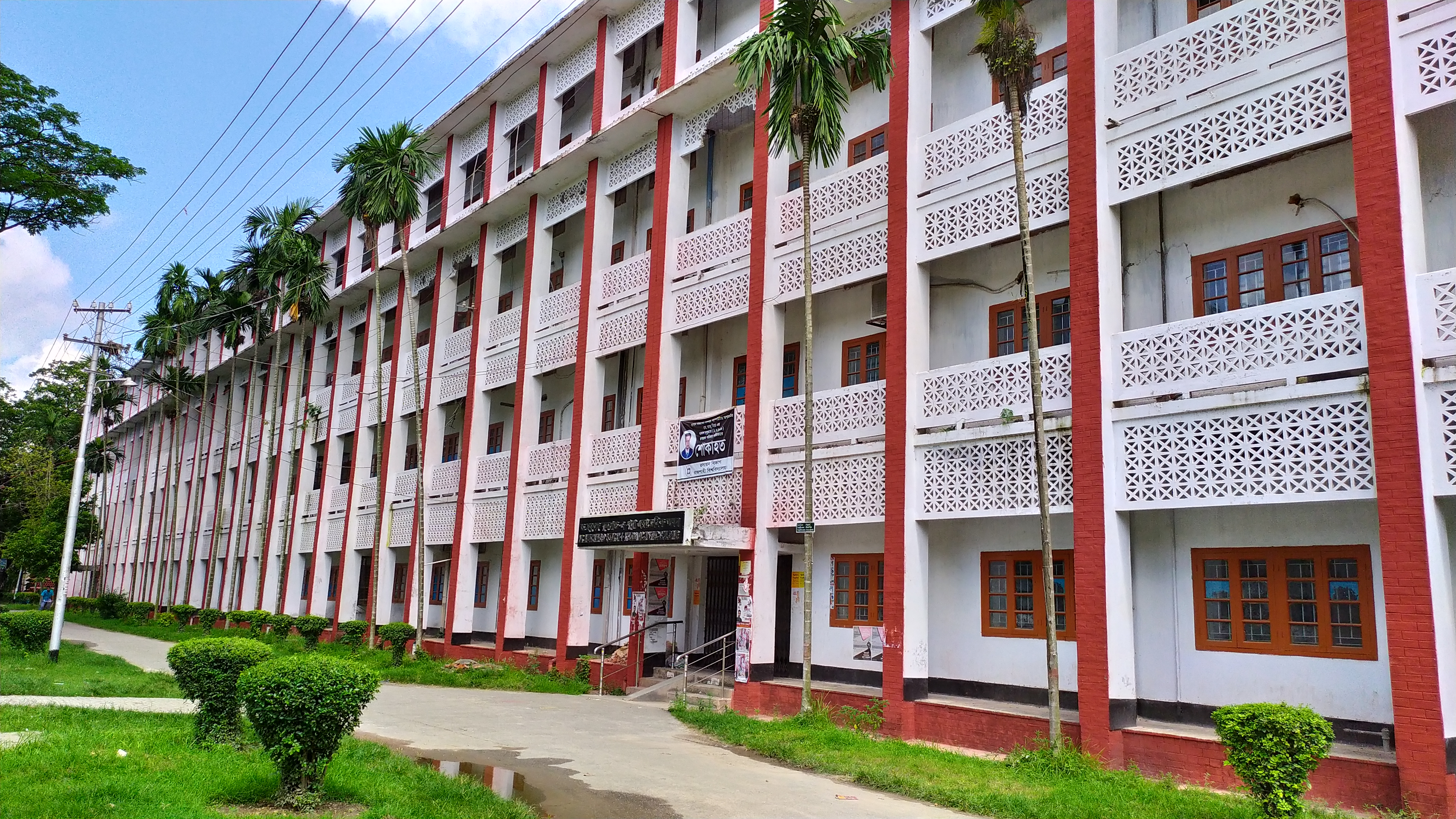
Muhammad Qudrat-i-Khuda academic building at University of Rajshahi

- A 10 taka commemorative stamp and an envelope with the title "Renouned[sic] Scientist Dr. Muhammad Qudrat-I-Khuda" in 2021
- Muhammad Qudrat-i-Khuda academic building at the University of Rajshahi.
- Dr. Muhammad Qudrat-i Khuda Fellowship at Bangladesh Council of Scientific and Industrial Research since 1978.
- Dr. Qudrat-I-Khuda Road in front of BCSIR Laboratories in Dhanmondi, Dhaka.
- Oxford Internation School, Dhaka has an auditorium named after Dr. Qudrat-I-Khuda.
