= Margram =

Margarm
- Village
- Location in West Bengal, India
- Coordinates: 24.151151°N 87.842242°E
- Country: India
- State: West Bengal
- District: Birbhum

Government
  - Type: Gram Panchayat

Population (2011)
  - Total: 30,055

Languages
  - Official: Bengali, English
- Time zone: UTC+5:30 (IST)
- PIN: 731202 (Margram)
- Telephone code: 03461
- Lok Sabha constituency: Birbhum
- Vidhan Sabha constituency: Hansan
- Website: birbhum.nic.in

Margarm is a village and gram panchayat in Rampurhat II CD Block in Rampurhat subdivision of Birbhum district in the Indian state of West Bengal.

== Geography ==
Cities and towns in Rampurhat subdivision of Birbhum district
M: municipal city/ town, CT: census town, R: rural/ urban centre.
Owing to space constraints in the small map, the actual locations in a larger map may vary slightly

=== Police station ===
Margarm police station has jurisdiction over Rampurhat II CD Block.

=== CD block HQ ===
The headquarters of Rampurhat II CD block are located at Margram.

=== Overview ===
The northern portion of Rampurhat subdivision (shown in the map alongside) is part of the Nalhati Plains, a sub-micro physiographic region, and the southern portion is part of the Brahmani-Mayurakshi Basin, another sub-micro physiographic region occupying the area between the Brahmani in the north and the Mayurakshi in the south. There is an occasional intrusion of Rajmahal Hills, from adjoining Santhal Parganas, towards the north-western part of the subdivision. On the western side is Santhal Parganas and the border between West Bengal and Jharkhand can be seen in the map. Murshidabad district is on the eastern side. A small portion of the Padma River and the border with Bangladesh (thick line) can be seen in the north-eastern corner of the map.96.62% of the population of Rampurhat subdivision live the rural areas and 3.38% of the population live in the urban areas.

Note: The map alongside presents some of the notable locations in the area. All places marked in the map are linked in the larger full screen map.

== Demographics ==
As per the 2011 Census of India, Margram had a total population of 30,055 of which 15,297 (51%) were males and 14,758 (49%) were females. Population below 6 years was 4,076. The total number of literates in Margram was 17,568 (67.62% of the population over 6 years).

== Transport ==
Margram is on the Rampurhat-Sherpur Road that links NH 14 at Rampurhat to SH 7 at Sherpur.

== Post Office ==
Margram has a delivery branch post office, with PIN 731202, under Baswa sub office and Rampurhat head office. Baswa sub office has the same PIN. Branch offices with the same PIN are situated at Barakartikchungri, Dakhalbati, Joykrishnapur, Kalua, Laha, Mallickpur and Ningha.

== Culture ==
Margram Bandhab Samiti Library, a government-sponsored library, was established in 1979. It has its own pucca building.

== Notable people ==
Muhammad Qudrat-i-Khuda, scientist, educationist and writer, was born in 1900 and spent his childhood at Margram. He and his associates patented 18 scientific inventions. He played an important role in popularising Bengali in scientific practices. He was the first Director of the East Regional Laboratories of the Pakistan Council of Scientific and Industrial Research in 1955. He was chairman of the National Education Commission of Bangladesh in 1972.

== Healthcare ==
Margram Primary Health Centre has 10 beds.
