= Palestinian Pottery =

Armenian ceramics workshop in Jerusalem, founded 1922

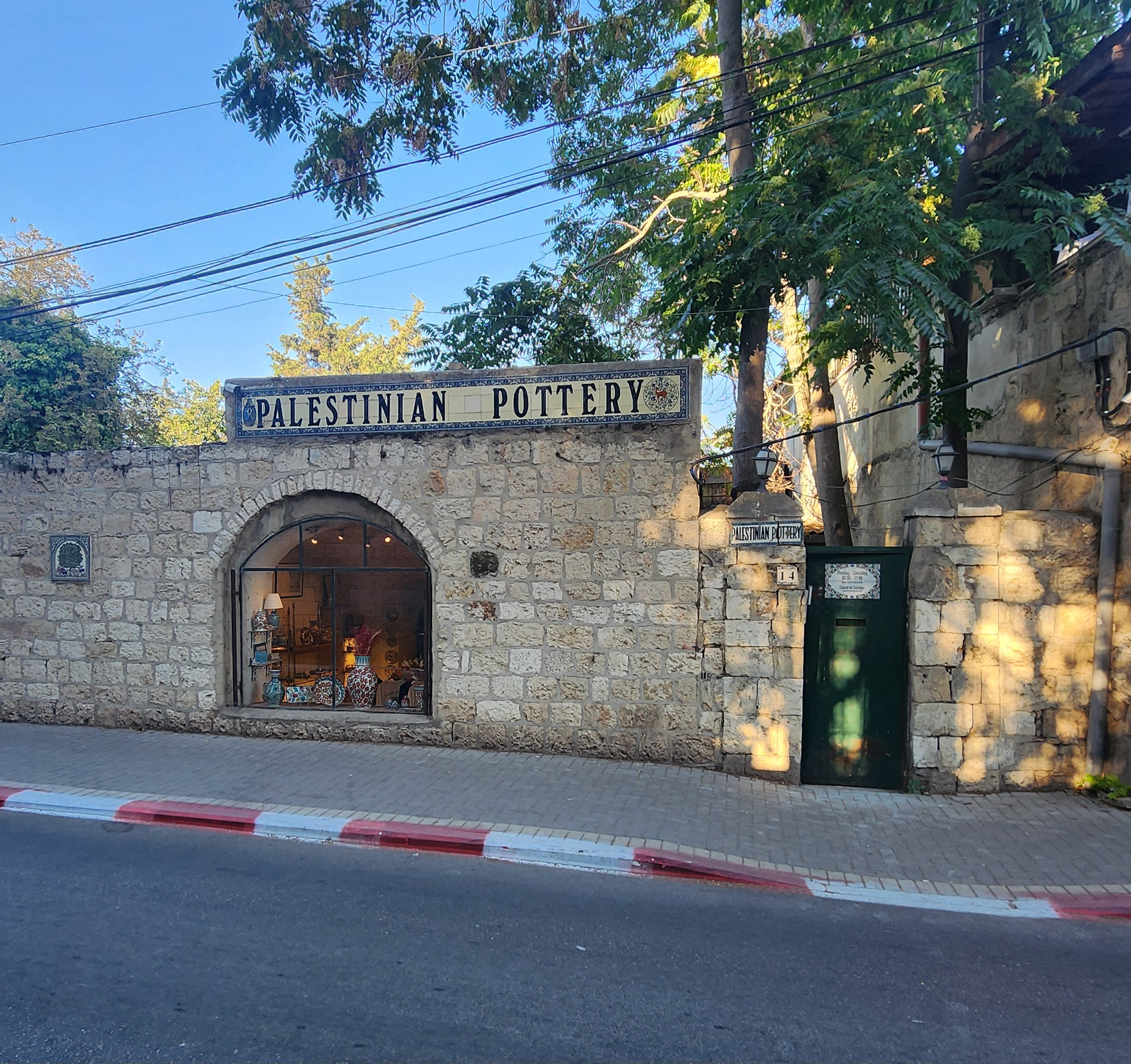
- The workshop on Nablus Road, 2026
- Trade name: Armenian Ceramics – Balian
- Type: Family-owned workshop
- Industry: Ceramics
- Founded: 1922
- Founders: Neshan Balian Sr., Mgrditch Karakashian
- Headquarters: Nablus Road, East Jerusalem
- Key people: Neshan Balian (director)
- Products: Hand-painted tiles, tile murals, pottery

The Palestinian Pottery (today trading as Armenian Ceramics – Balian) is an Armenian ceramics workshop on Nablus Road in East Jerusalem. It was founded in 1922 by the potter Neshan Balian Sr. and the painter Mgrditch Karakashian, two of the Kütahya craftsmen brought to Jerusalem in 1919 by David Ohannessian to restore the tiles of the Dome of the Rock. Run by the Balian family for four generations, it is one of the oldest ceramics workshops in the city, and was the studio of the muralist Marie Balian.

== History ==
=== Origins ===
In 1919, during the British Mandate, the military governor Ronald Storrs engaged David Ohannessian, a ceramicist from Kütahya, to renovate the damaged tile revetment of the Dome of the Rock. In the autumn of 1919 Ohannessian returned to Kütahya to obtain clays and glazes and recruited a group of surviving Armenian ceramicists, among them the wheel potter Neshan Balian and the painter Mgrditch Karakashian. The Dome of the Rock commission was cut short in 1922.

=== The Balian–Karakashian partnership (1922–mid-1960s) ===
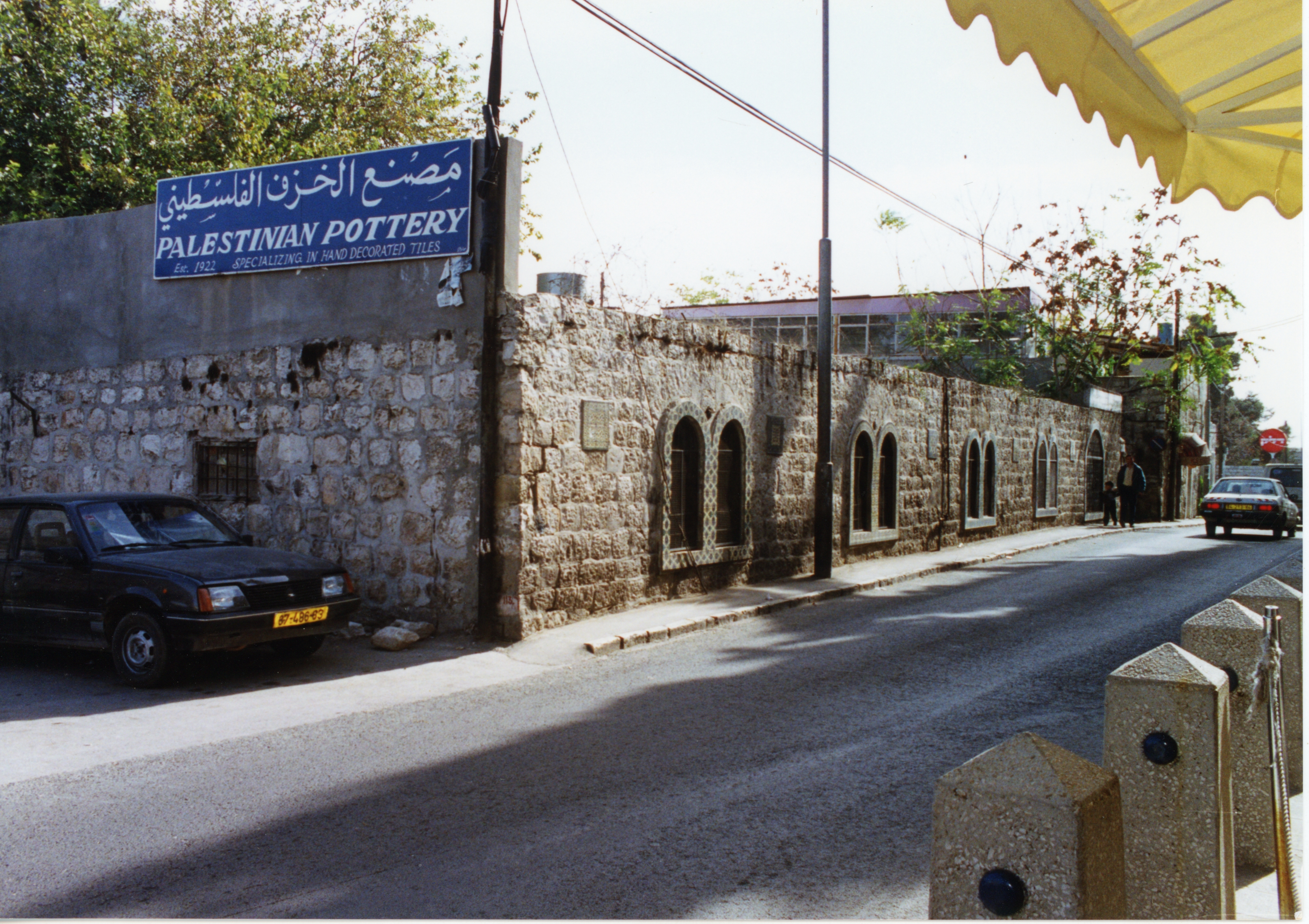
The workshop on Nablus Road in the 1990s, with its original sign in English and Arabic

In 1922 Balian and Karakashian left Ohannessian's workshop and founded their own atelier on Nablus Road, outside the Old City walls, under the name Palestinian Pottery. Balian was responsible for the pottery, clay bodies and glazes and Karakashian for the drawing and painting. The workshop produced decorative tiles, bowls, dishes and vases in the Kütahya tradition, combining Armenian and Ottoman floral and geometric ornament with local motifs. Its wares of the Mandate and Jordanian periods are held by the Eretz Israel Museum and have been catalogued as "Armenian Painted Ware, Jerusalem".

Neshan Balian's son Setrak Balian studied ceramic technology in England, including with Ray Finch at Winchcombe Pottery, and returned to the workshop in the early 1950s. In 1954 he married the French-Armenian painter Marie Alexanian, who trained at the École nationale supérieure des beaux-arts de Lyon.

In the mid-1960s, after the death of Mgrditch Karakashian, the two families separated amicably. The Karakashians established the Jerusalem Pottery on the Via Dolorosa, while the Balians continued the Nablus Road workshop.

=== The Balian workshop (mid-1960s–present) ===
With the departure of the Karakashian painters, Marie Balian became the workshop's master painter. She introduced large-scale tile murals with asymmetrical garden compositions of trees, birds, gazelles and peacocks, which brought the workshop international attention. In 1992 the Smithsonian Institution mounted a six-month exhibition of her panels, Views of Paradise; further exhibitions followed at the Armenian Library and Museum of America in Watertown, Massachusetts, the Eretz Israel Museum (Birds of Paradise, 2000) and in Alicante, Spain. Her 2004 mural A Glimpse of Paradise, of roughly one thousand tiles, stands on Koresh Street in Jerusalem, and her "Tree of Life" design was reproduced on an Israeli postage stamp. A water jug thrown by Setrak Balian and painted by Marie Balian is in the collection of the Victoria and Albert Museum.

Workshop commissions include tile panels for the Cathedral of Saint James in the Armenian Quarter and work for the President's Residence in Jerusalem.

Since the 1990s the workshop has been directed by Neshan Balian, son of Setrak and Marie Balian, who studied ceramic engineering in the United States; members of the fourth generation of the family work in the studio. In 2022 it employed thirteen potters and painters. In 2019–2020 the centenary of Armenian ceramics in Jerusalem was marked by the Israel Museum exhibition A Glimpse of Paradise at the Rockefeller Archaeological Museum, which included the workshop's history and Marie Balian's murals.

== See also ==
- Armenian ceramics in Jerusalem
- Marie Balian
- David Ohannessian
