= Armenian ceramics in Jerusalem =

Armenian Ceramics of Jerusalem

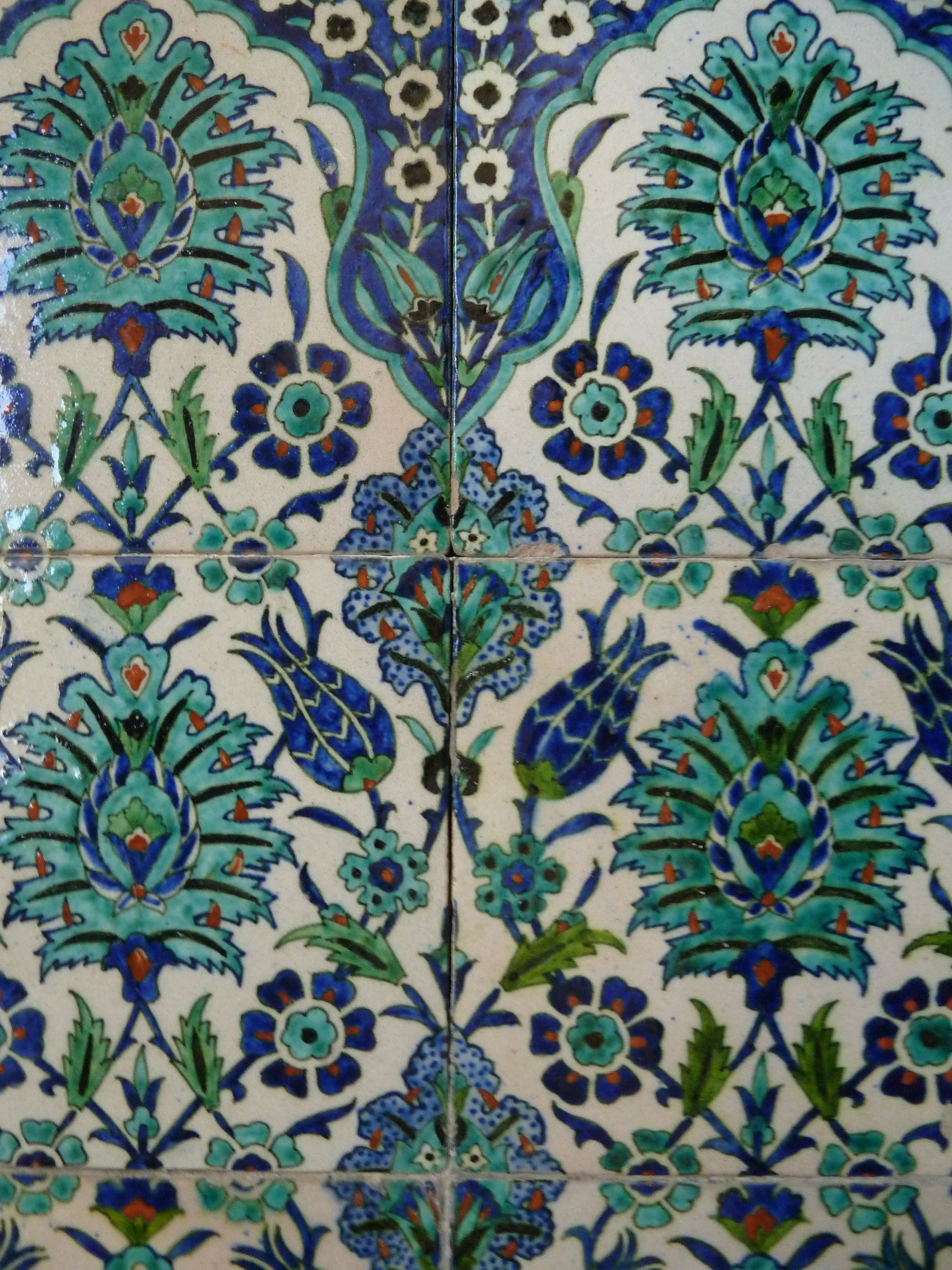
Armenian tiles at St Andrew's Church, Jerusalem

Jerusalem's ancient Armenian community experienced a major increase in numbers as survivors of the Armenian genocide perpetrated by the government of the Ottoman Empire beginning in 1915 found refuge in Jerusalem's Armenian Quarter. The industry was started by David Ohannessian and other refugees from Kütahya, a city in western Anatolia noted for its Iznik pottery. The tiles decorate many of the city's most notable buildings, including Ohannessian's tiles for the Rockefeller Museum, Mardigian Museum of Armenian Art and Culture, and American Colony Hotel, and the House of the President of Israel.

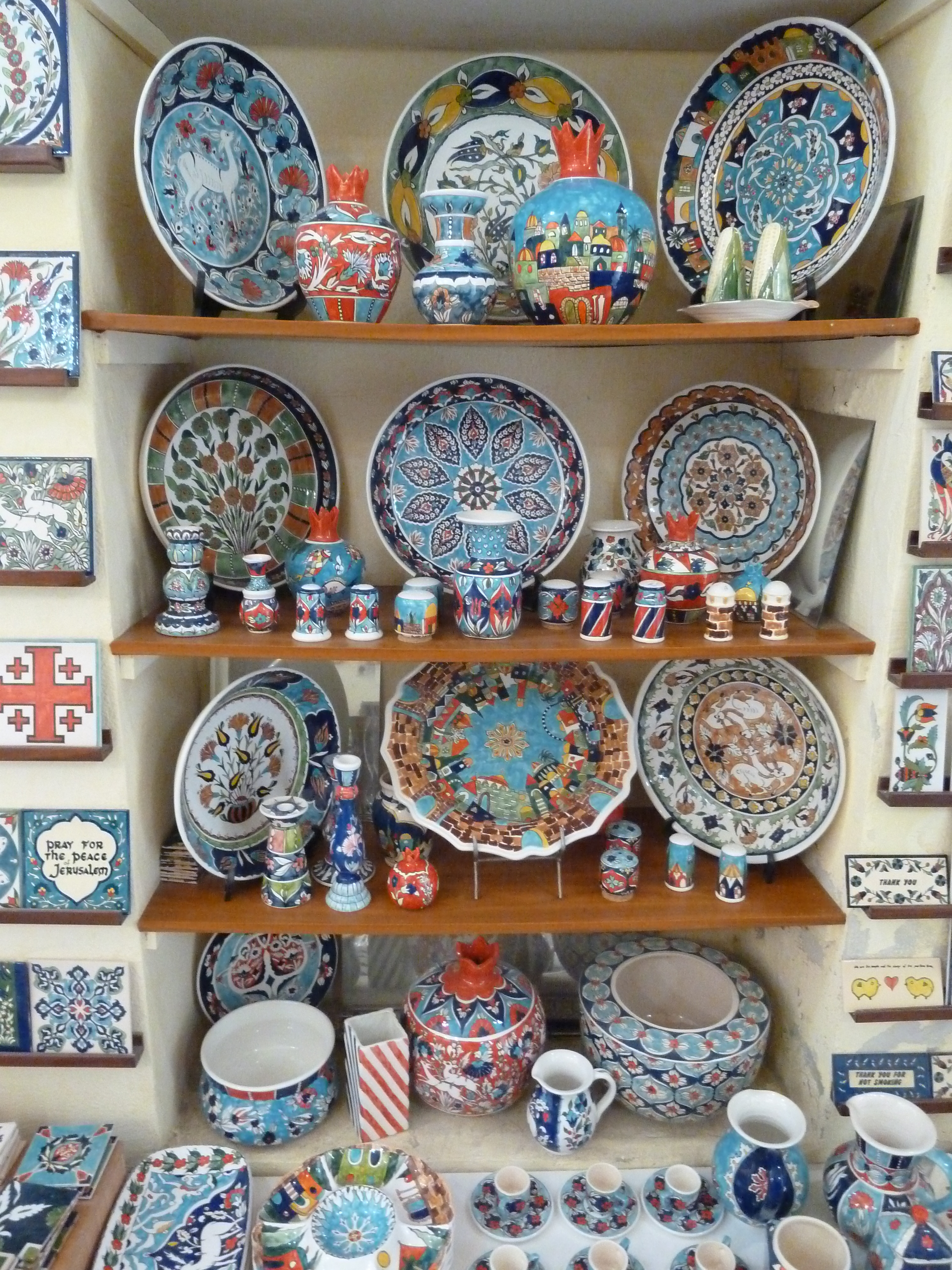
Armenian ceramics sold at a store in the Old City of Jerusalem

David Ohannessian (1884–1953), who had established a pottery in Kütahya in 1907, is credited with establishing the Armenian ceramic craft industry in Jerusalem. After the Young Turk Revolution in 1908, Ohannessian gained renown for his tile renovations of historic monuments. He worked in cooperation with Kütahya's two other worksops of that era, those owned by Mehmet Emin and by the Minassian brothers--Garabed and Harutyun. In 1911 Ohannessian was commissioned with designing and executing Kütahya tile revetments for the Yorkshire home of Mark Sykes. In late 1915, during the Armenian genocide, Ohannessian was arrested and imprisoned in Kütahya; like many other Armenian notables, he was falsely accused of engaging in revolutionary activities. In early 1916, he and his family were deported from Kütahya by rail and forced march. The family found refuge in Aleppo for nearly two years; they moved to Jerusalem when Sykes suggested that Ohannessian might be able to replicate the broken and missing tiles on the Dome of the Rock, a building then in a decayed and neglected condition. Although the commission for repair tiles for the Dome of the Rock was cut short in 1922, the Ohannession pottery in Jerusalem succeeded, as did the Karakashian painters and Balian potters that Ohannessian brought back with him when he briefly returned to Kütahya in the autumn of 1919 to obtain kaolin clays and other needed minerals from Kutahya. After about 60 years new Armenian artists started to have their own studios.

In 2019 the Israel Museum mounted a special exhibition of Jerusalem pottery in its Rockefeller Museum branch location.

Lower quality, mass-produced imitations of Armenian pottery produced in Arab cities and in China are popular with tourists, undercutting the carefully crafted, traditional pottery. A form of Palestinian Arab ceramics inspired by the Armenian style is known as Hebron pottery.

== See also ==
- Israeli art
