= Marie Balian =

Armenian ceramic artist (1925–2017)

- Born: January 25, 1925; Marseille
- Died: September 13, 2017 (aged 92); East Jerusalem

Marie Balian, née Alexanian, (January 25, 1925 in Marseille, France – September 13, 2017 in East Jerusalem) was an Armenian artist and ceramic painter, especially known for her distinctive and impressive ceramic tile murals.

Her family originally came from the small Turkish town Kutahya. They fled Turkey on foot to Greece in 1917. From there, they took ship for France. Marie grew up in Lyon, France. As a six-year-old girl she began drawing and at ten she was doing portraits. She studied at the École nationale supérieure des Beaux-Arts in Lyon but had to drop out for financial reasons. In 1953 she met her distant cousin Setrak on his way to study ceramic technology with Ray Finch and Bernard Leach in England. They married in 1954 in Bethlehem.

Her contribution to Middle Eastern art was to introduce more Armenian elements, such as trees, animals and birds in a primitive style and elevate the craft to fine art and therewith brought her own cachet. She added movement to what had traditionally been static compositions and reminded us of the glorious beauty of nature. Suddenly, gazelles were prancing, peacocks were preening, garlands were flowing. The concept known as the Gardens and Views of Paradise of Marie Balian developed. She referred to 13th century after Christ when Persian artists were favoring garden scenes for their painted ceramic tiles. Symmetry gave way to dynamic asymmetry. At a later age she herself becomes aware she is a link in an ancient chain, and that she has played a crucial role in rescuing one branch of a centuries-old tradition from oblivion. "It's very easy for me. It's as if I had already done this in an earlier age, like the fourth, fifth or sixth century." She became the master painter of the Balian atelier in East Jerusalem, the Palestinian Pottery and a renowned artist.

In the introduction of the documentary "The Glimps of Paradise" about her life and art and worldwide recognition Marie is described as one of the icons of the Jerusalem art world. The book "Birds of Paradise" further documents her fine art. In recent years, her work has received attention via social media on the Internet.

== Balian Family ==
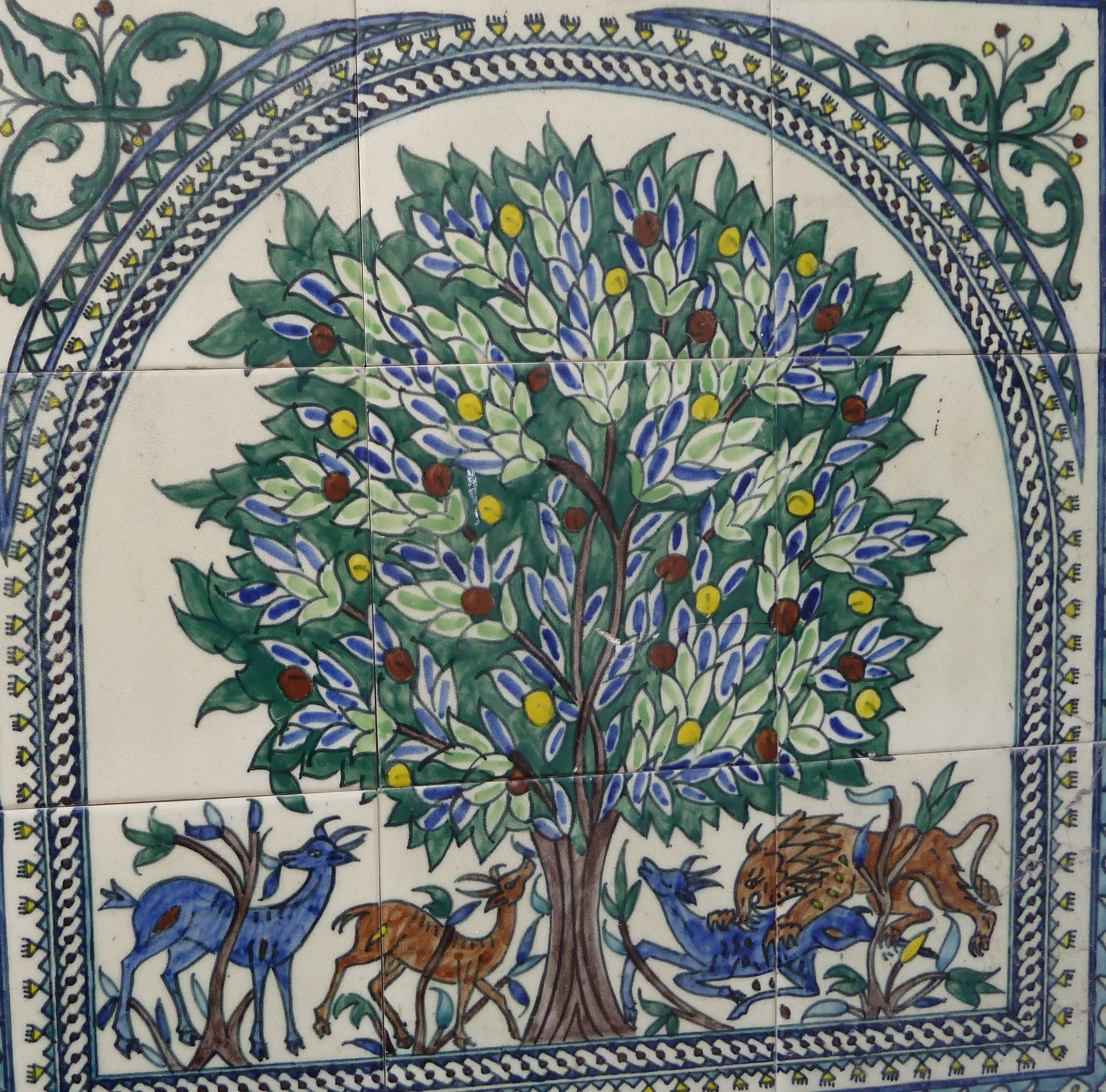
Armenian Pottery at Marie Balian's Workshop, copy of "Tree of Life" mosaic from Hisham's Palace

In the 1600s, Armenian artisans in a small Turkish town named Kutahya worked within a distinctive Islamicate style in decorative ceramic ware as well as tiles, while also developing a series of unique and instantly recognizable local styles including playful figures, ceramic eggs, coffee cups, rosewater jars and various types of votive objects. In late 1918, after British forces occupied Aleppo, David Ohannessian learned that Mandatory authorities were seeking a ceramicist skilled in historical renovation to consult on the restoration of the Dome of the Rock. Ohannessian(commons), a renowned ceramicist who had established a workshop in Kutahya in 1907 and had developed an international clientele there, but had been deported to Aleppo in 1916, made his way to Jerusalem to consult on the planned renovation of the monument. After some experiments with the existing 19th century kiln and local materials, Ohannessian returned to Kutahya to obtain the needed clays and other minerals and recruit the remaining Armenian ceramicists to join him in Jerusalem. Ohannessian brought 8-10 Kutahya artisans to Jerusalem in 1919, including the expert wheel potter Nishan Balian, and the accomplished painter Mgrditch Karakashian. Balian and Karakashian worked for Ohannessian until 1922, when they struck out on their own, opening a second Armenian ceramics atelier in Jerusalem, located on Nablus Road. In 1966 the Balian and Karakashian families split their businesses and established separate workshops. The Balian atelier was known as the Palestinian Pottery and Marie was the master painter. Neshan Balian, Marie's son feels compelled to continue the family tradition. He studied ceramic engineering in the United States

== Fame and recognition ==
Marie Balian came to world attention in 1992 when the Smithsonian Institution, the national museum of the United States, paid tribute to her work with a six-month show. The exhibition "Views of Paradise" included more than 20 wall-size panels that together presented the artist's conception of the ultimate garden. The exhibition was so well-received that the gallery extended its stay Further exhibitions followed in Boston MA (ALMA Museum), Israel (Eretz Israel Museum) and Alicante, Spain. Balian's work is shown on a stamp and many publications followed Balian's work is widely spread on the internet, and in museums such as the Victoria & Albert Museum in London, England

Works from the "Views of Paradise" exhibition were installed in the Persian Garden in Wassenaar, The Netherlands.

== Gallery ==
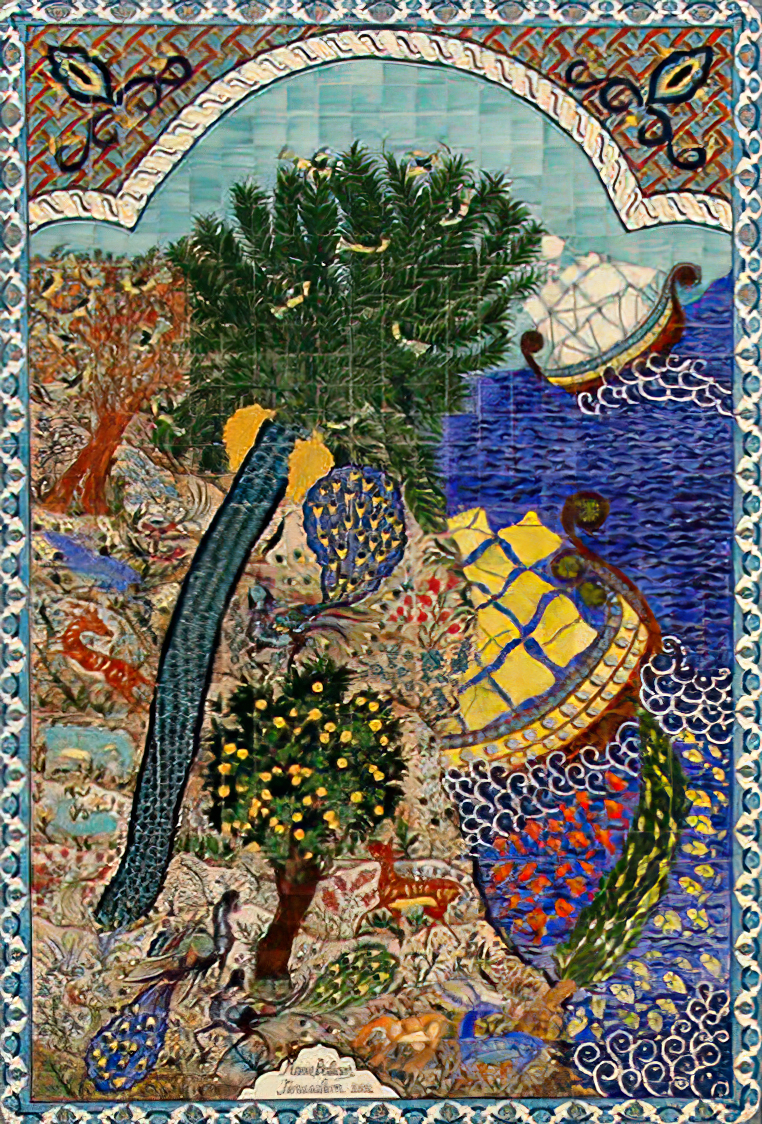
Glimpse of Paradise (2004), Jerusalem

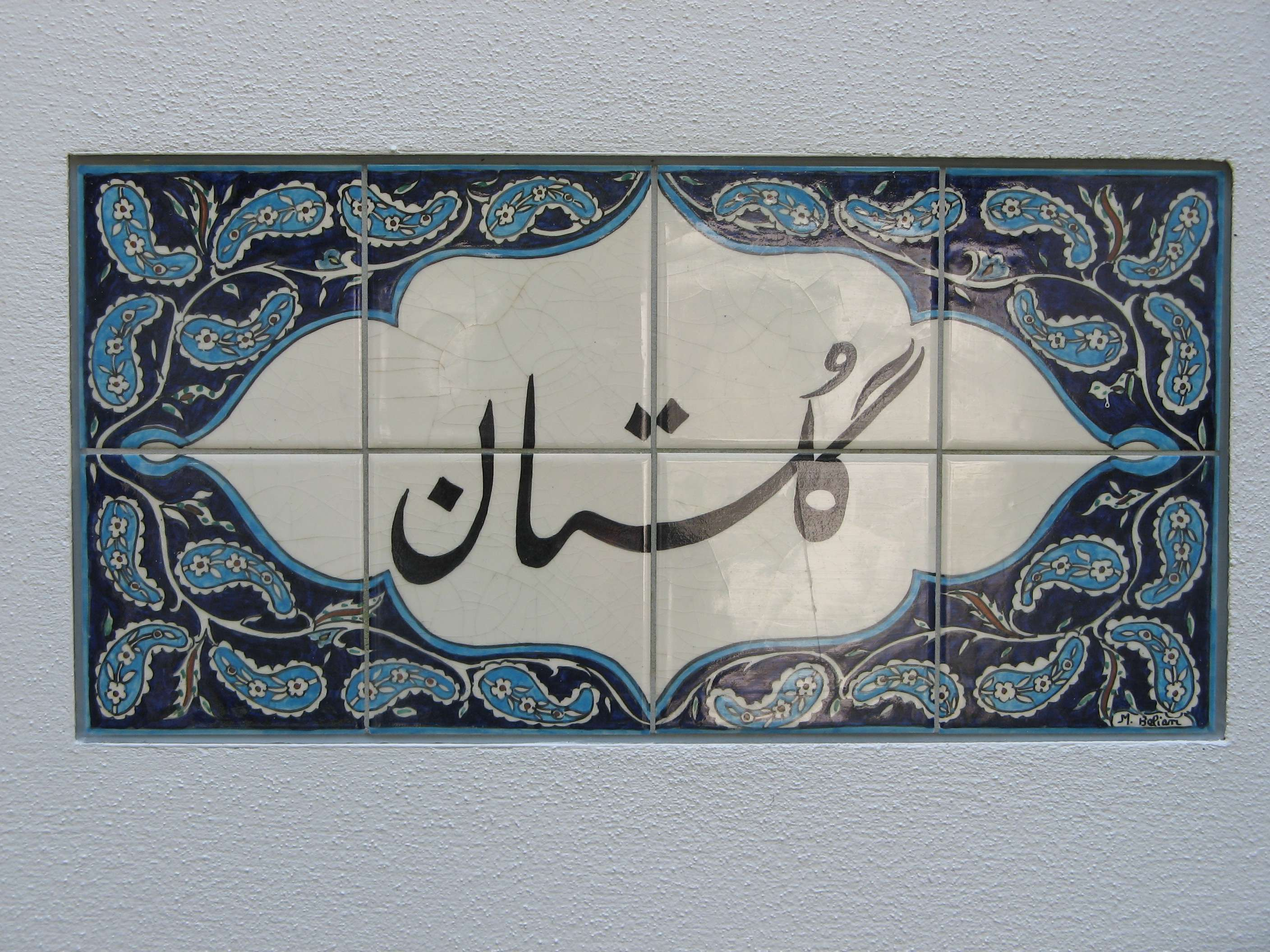
Persian Garden

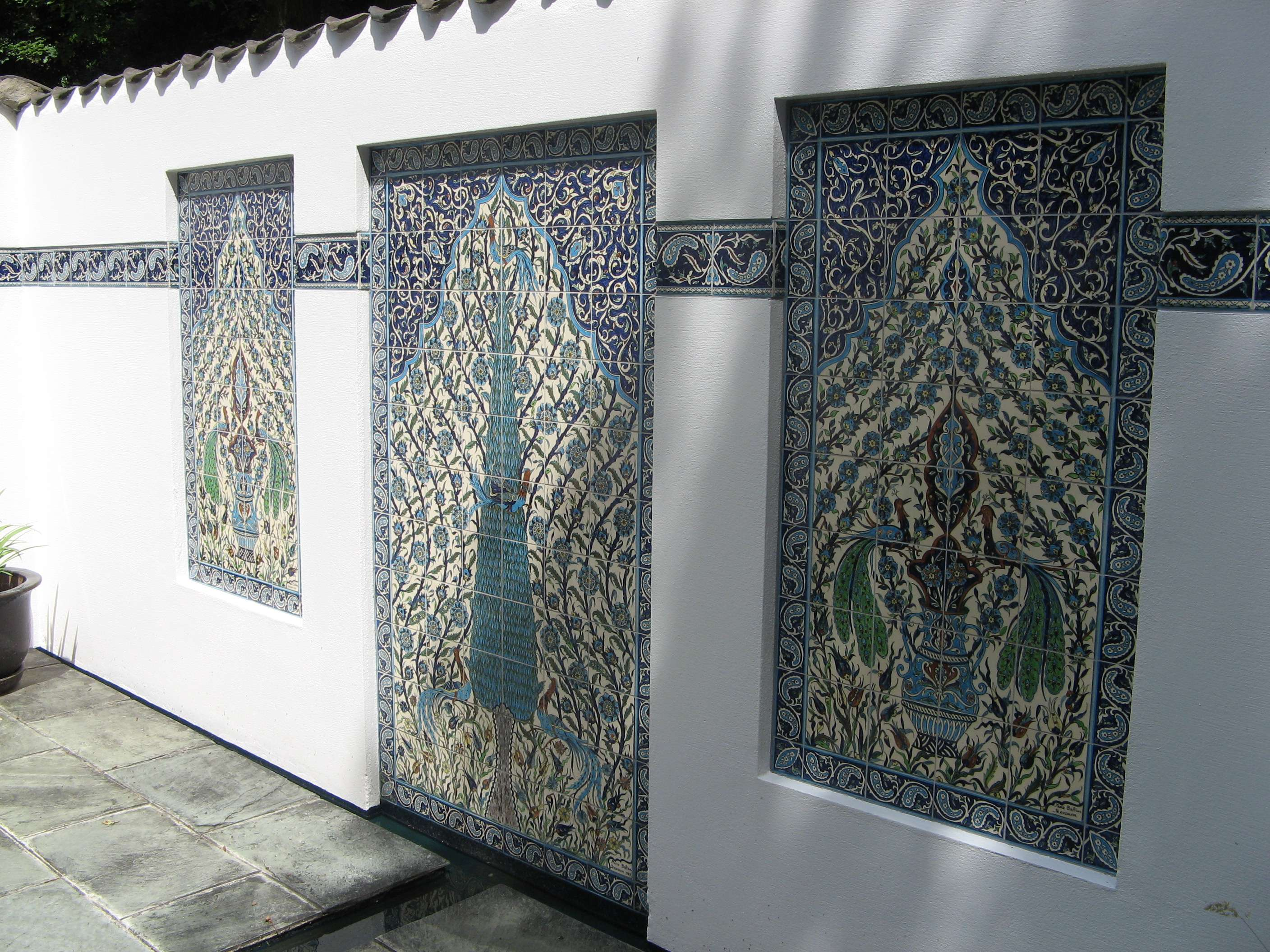
Persian Garden

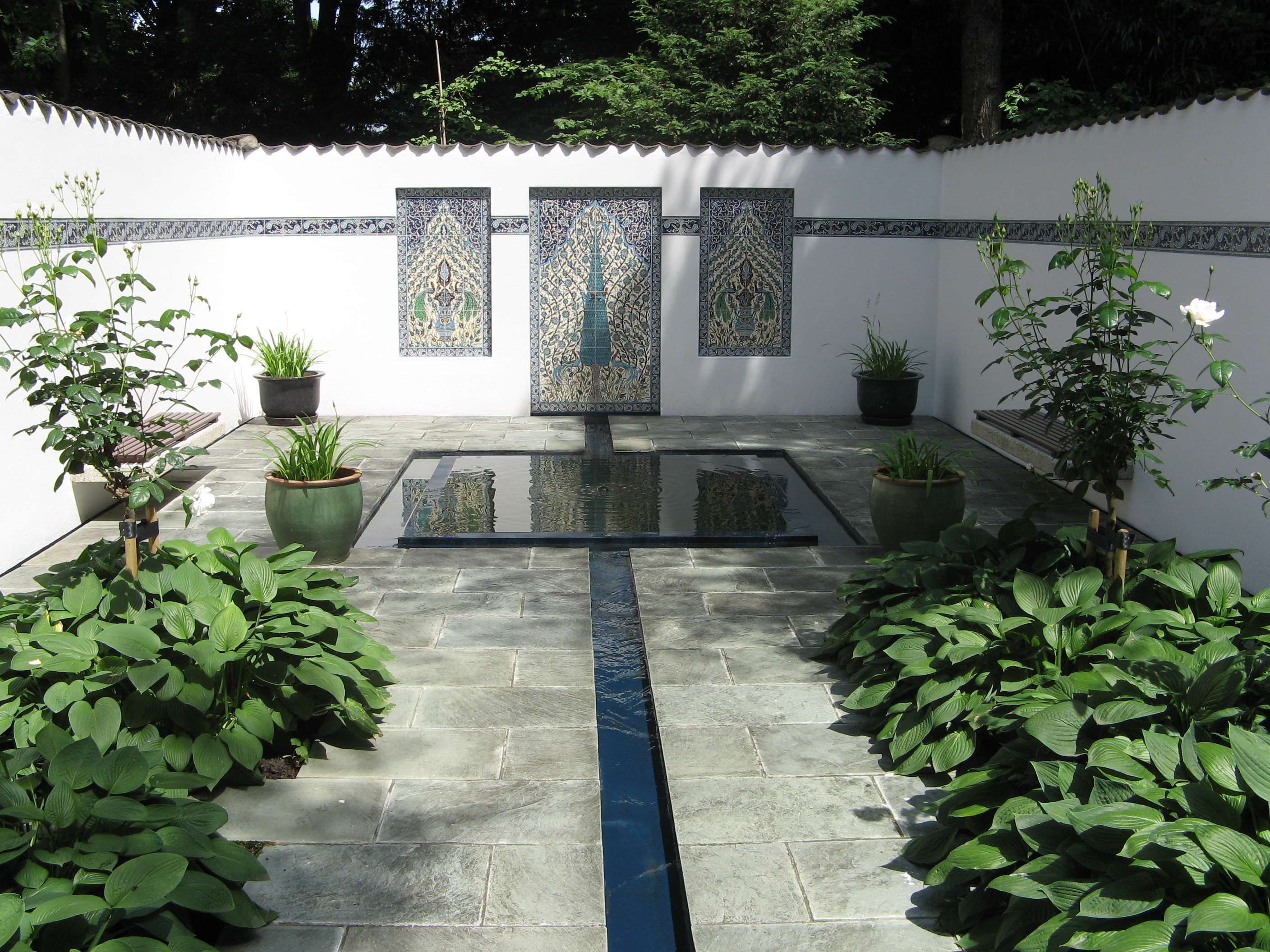
Persian Garden

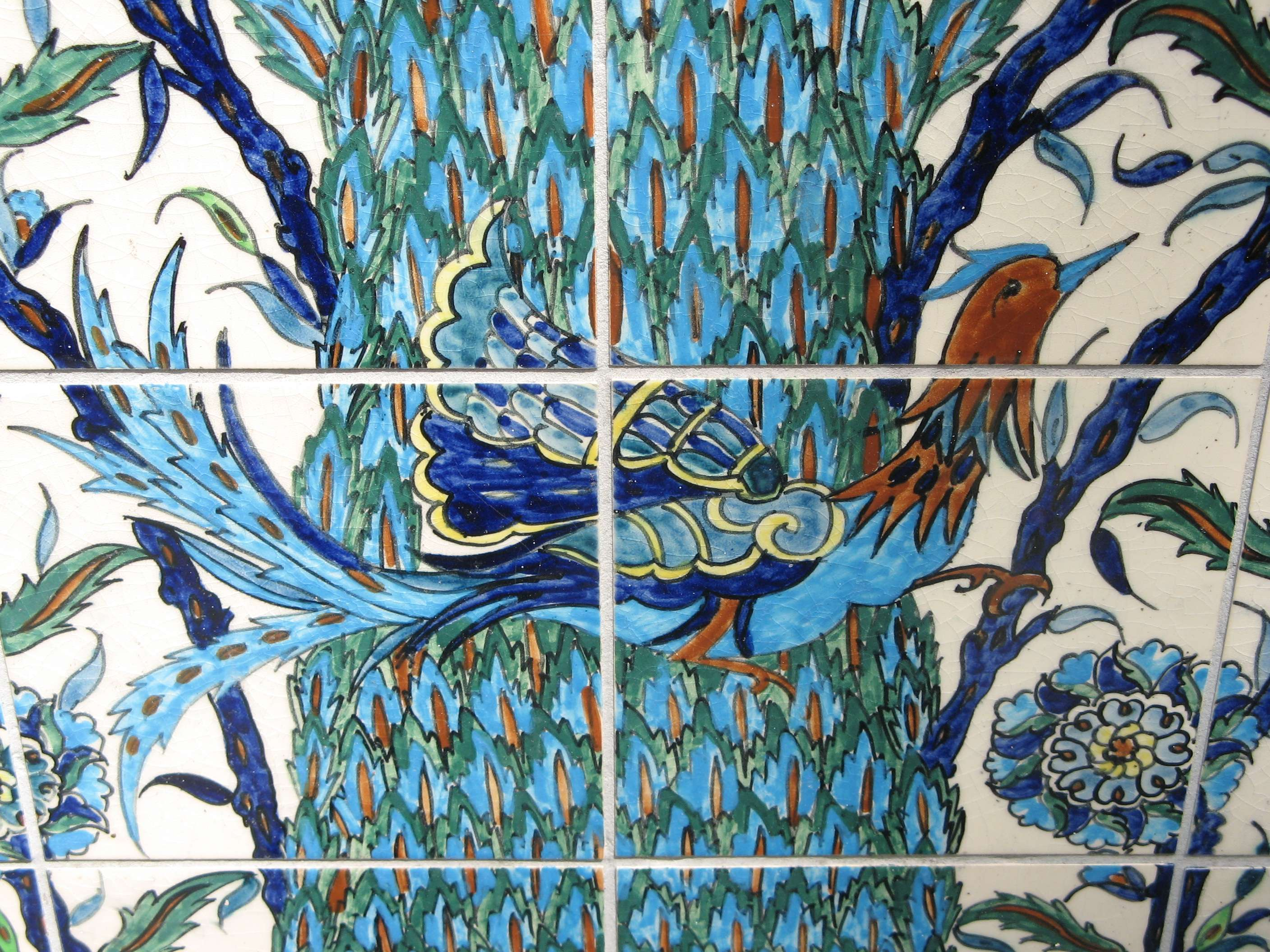
Persian Garden
