= Rockefeller Archeological Museum =

Museum in Jerusalem

Coordinates: 31°47′3″N 35°14′10″E

Rockefeller Museum
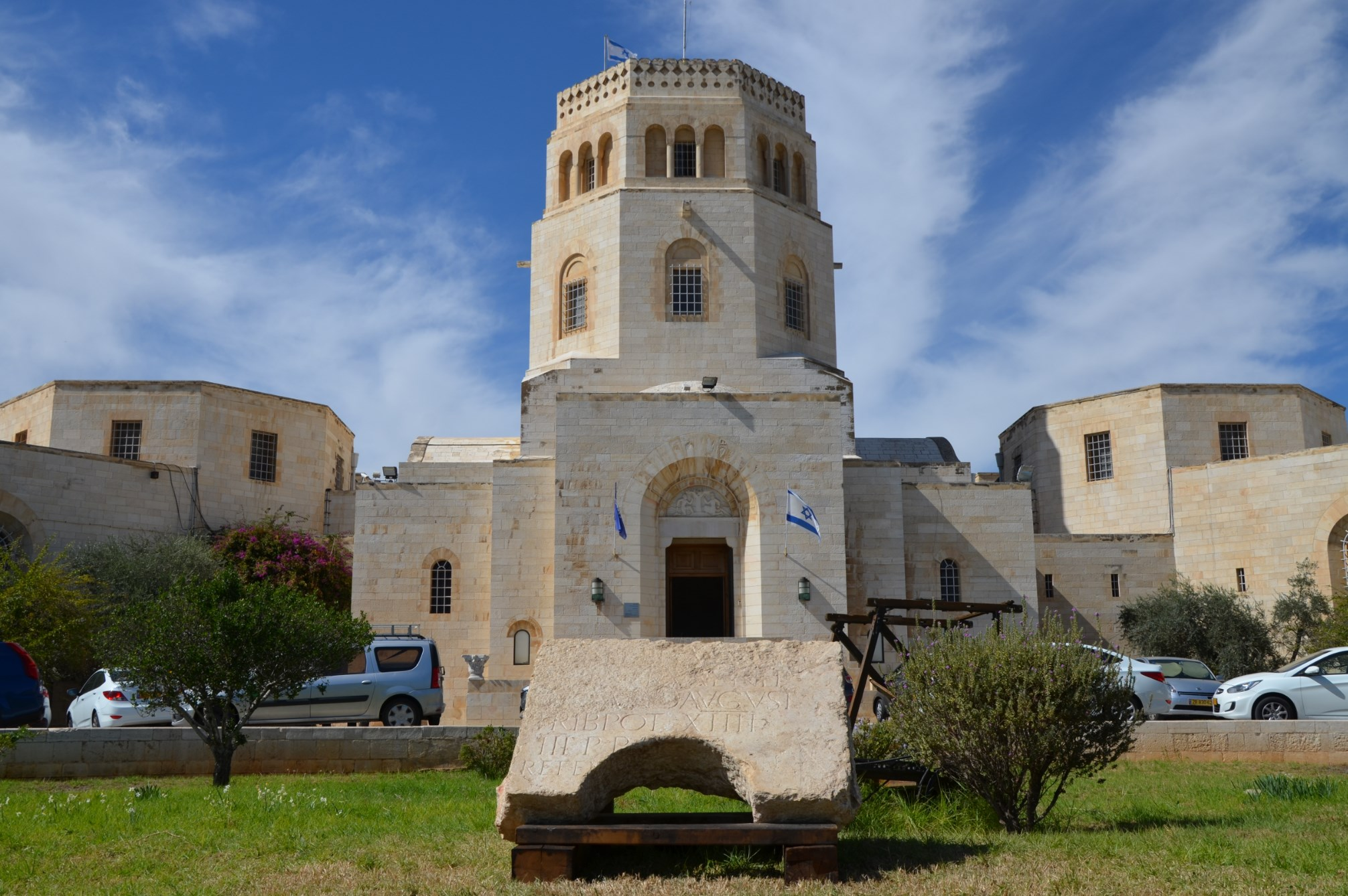
- Rockefeller Museum, Jerusalem
- Established: 13 January 1938 (opening date)
- Location: 27 Sultan Suleiman Street, Jerusalem
- Type: Archaeology museum
- Curator: Fawzi Ibrahim
- Website: imj.org.il/ram

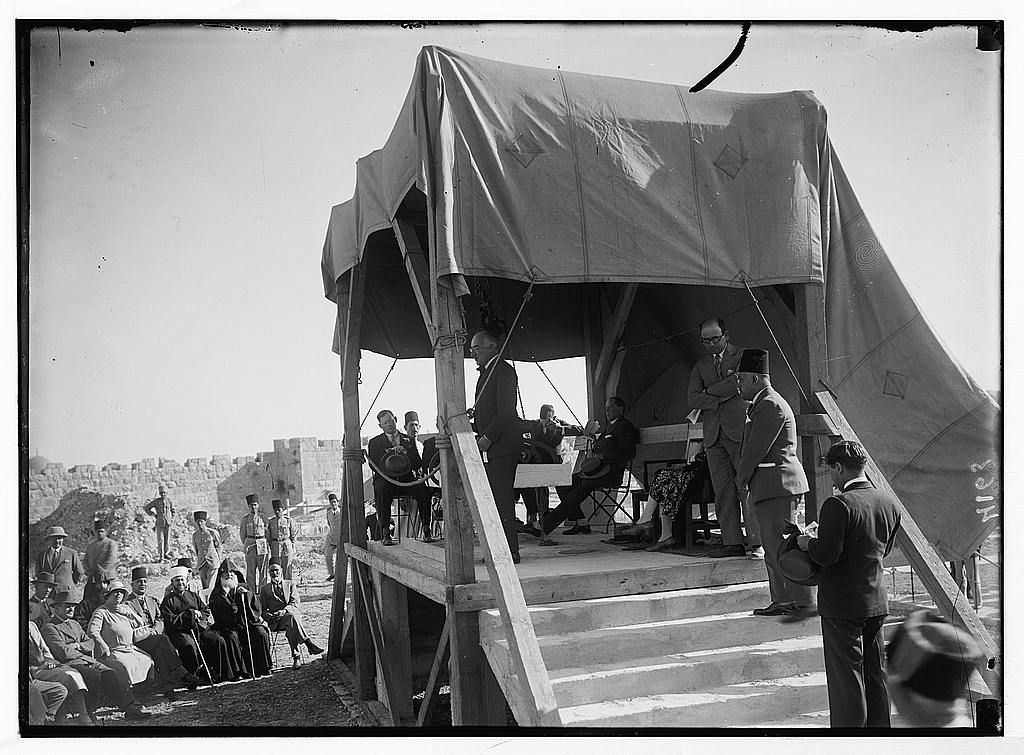
Laying of the cornerstone, 19 June 1930.

The Rockefeller Archeological Museum, formerly the Palestine Archaeological Museum ("PAM"; 1938–1967), is an archaeology museum located in Jerusalem, next to Herod's Gate, that houses a large collection of artifacts unearthed in the excavations conducted in the British-ruled Mandatory Palestine, mainly in the 1920s and 1930s.

The museum was established through a donation by John D. Rockefeller Jr. for the creation of a museum and research center in Cairo. Designed by British architect Austen Harrison, it blends Western architectural achievements with Eastern influences, using materials such as Turkish nut doors and Armenian ceramics. The foundation stone was laid in June 1930, and the museum opened in January 1938. Initially managed by an international body, it was nationalized by the Jordanians in 1966. During the Six-Day War in 1967, battles occurred in the area, and the museum came under Israeli control. Renamed the "Rockefeller Museum," it is now managed by the Israel Museum and houses the head office of the Israel Antiquities Authority.

The Museum's most prized collection, the Dead Sea Scrolls, were housed in the Museum from their discovery, in 1947, until 1967, when, following the Israeli capture of East Jerusalem, Israel relocated the scrolls to the Israel Museum, in West Jerusalem, with the ownership of these scrolls having been heavily contested ever since. A small part of the scrolls, including the Copper Scroll, had been taken to Amman, and is now part of the collection of The Jordan Museum.

== History ==
=== Background ===
Prior to the establishment of the Museum, the British Mandate's Department of Antiquities and British School of Archaeology were housed in an old building in Jerusalem with a small exhibition hall. The only other archaeological museum in Jerusalem at the time was the Franciscan Biblical Museum, built in 1902. Before the First World War, there had been an Ottoman Imperial Museum of Antiquities in Jerusalem (Müze-i Hümayun; 1901–1917), later known as the Palestine Archaeological Museum.

In 1919, British town planner Patrick Geddes proposed the establishment of an antiquities museum in Jerusalem. To further the project, the Mandate authorities proposed a special tourism tax in 1924.

Visiting Mandatory Palestine in 1925, James Henry Breasted, founder and director of the University of Chicago's Oriental Institute, recognized the need for an archaeological museum in Jerusalem to house important regional finds. Encouraged by Lord Plumer, the British High Commissioner, Breasted approached American philanthropist John D. Rockefeller Jr., who agreed to donate two million dollars toward the project.

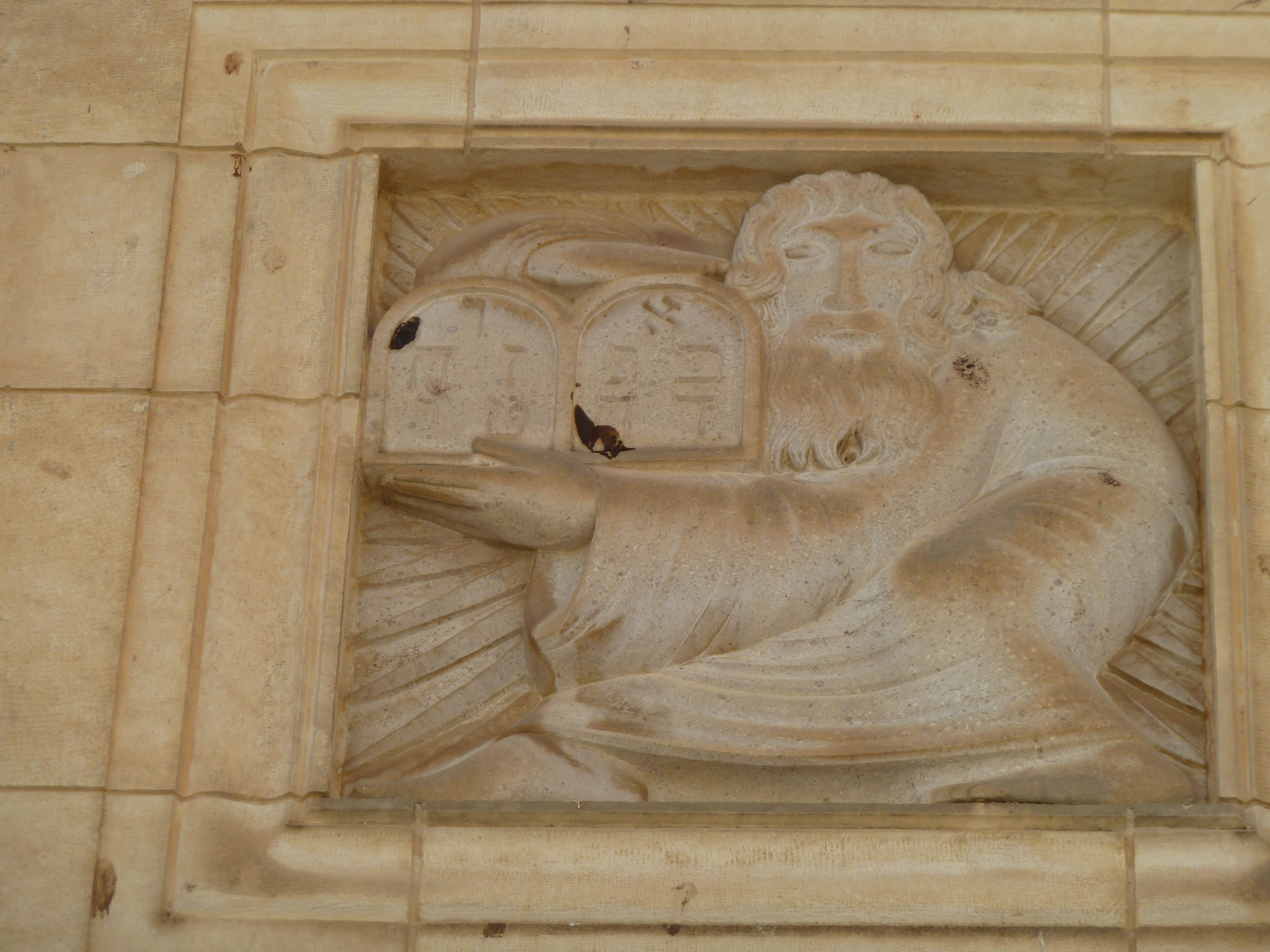
Relief representing Israelite culture, one of ten bas-reliefs by Eric Gill in the inner courtyard at the museum.

=== Construction, Mandate-time museum (1930–1948) ===
The museum was designed by Austen Harrison, chief architect of the Mandatory Department of Public Works, who drew up blueprints for a white limestone building integrating eastern and western architectural elements. The cornerstone of the new museum was laid on June 19, 1930, but construction was delayed due to the discovery of tombs dating to the fifth century B.C. at the building site. The museum features a stone bas-relief of the meeting of Asia and Africa above the main entrance together with ten stone reliefs illustrating different cultures and a gargoyle fountain in the inner courtyard carved in 1934 by the British sculptor Eric Gill (1882–1940). Gill also produced stone carved signage throughout the museum in English, Hebrew, and Arabic; the Hebrew lettering was inspired by fonts from recently discovered Second Temple-era artifacts, most prominently the Uzziah tablet, but also ossuaries from the period.

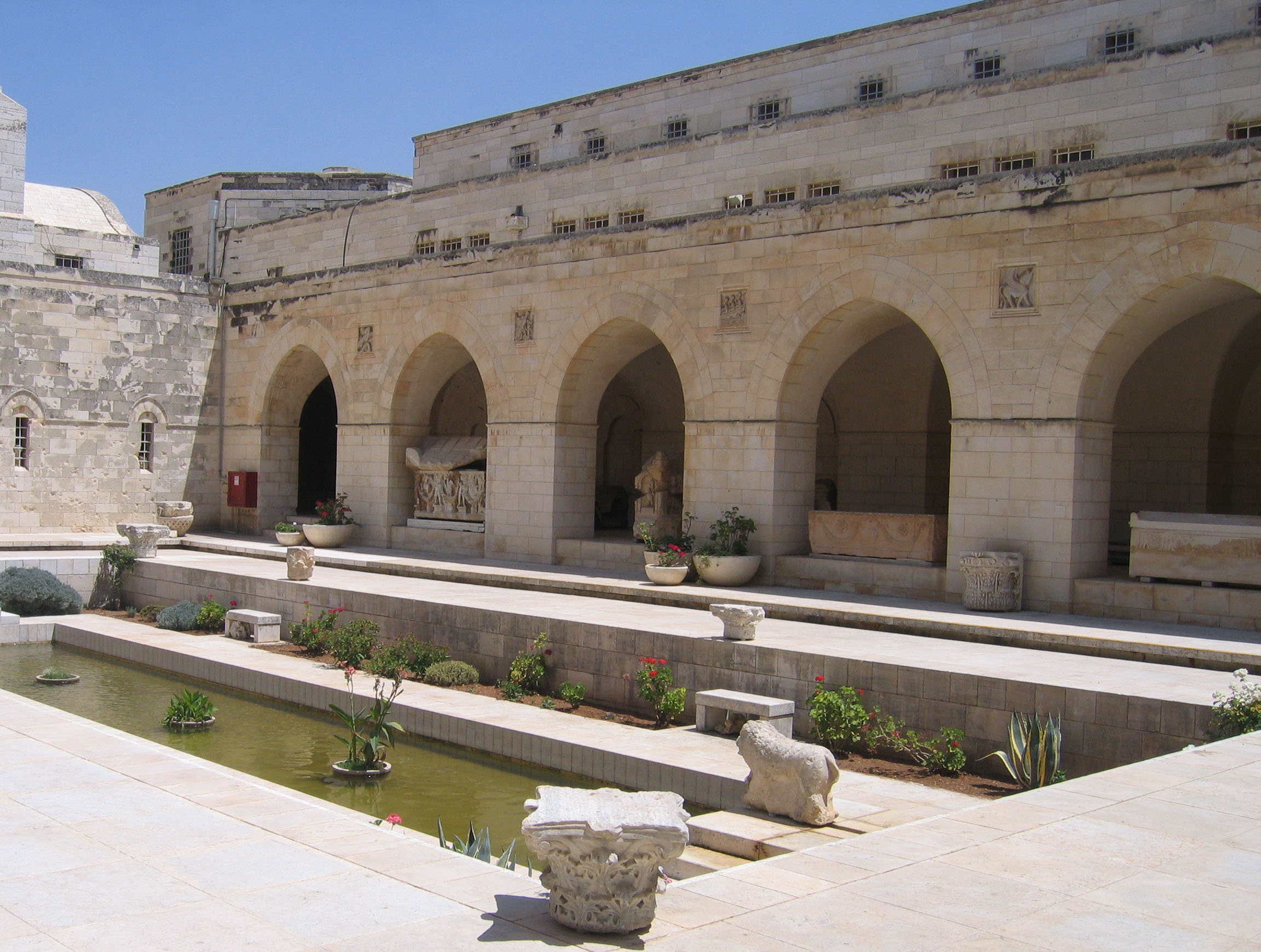
Rockefeller Museum inner courtyard.

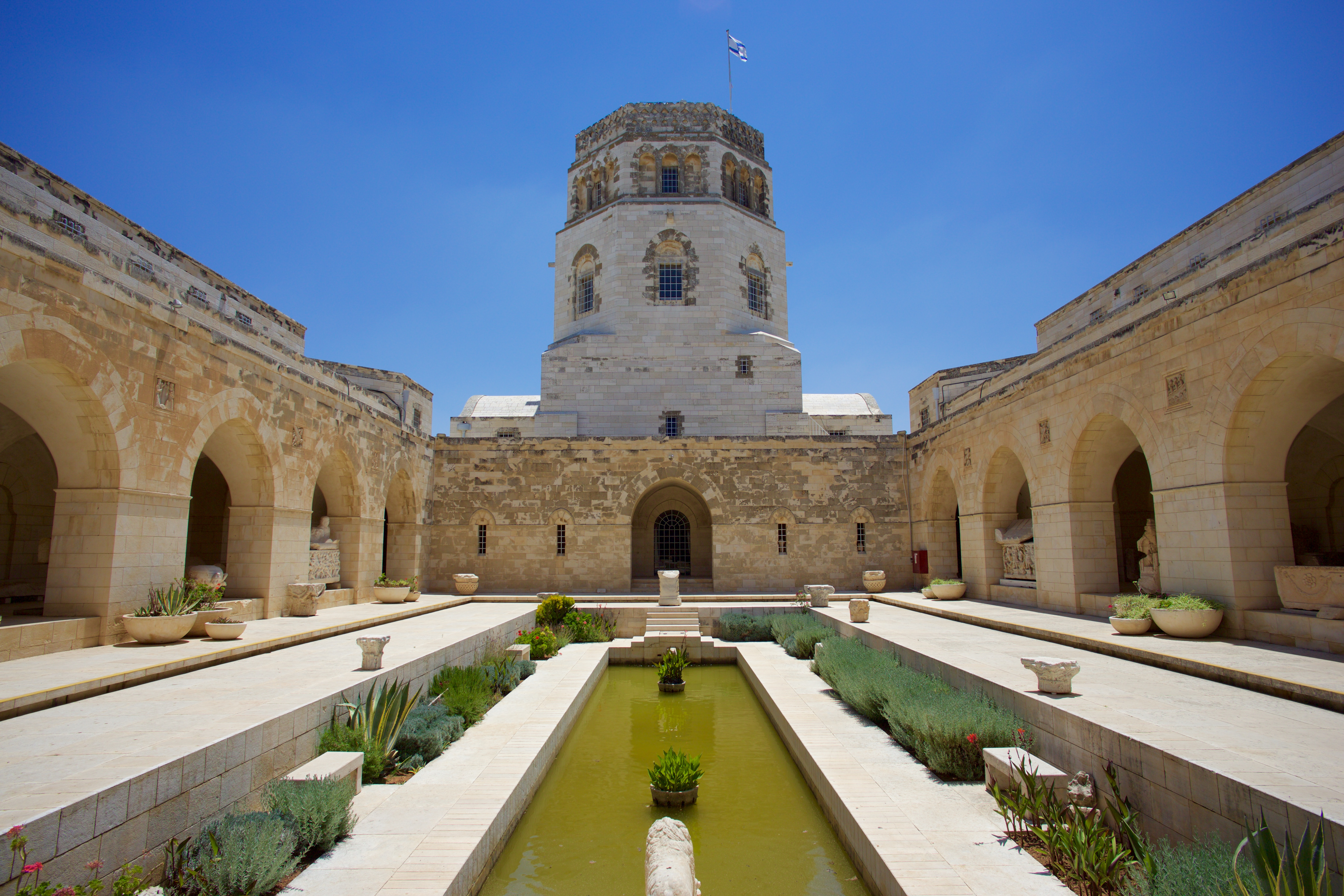
Inner courtyard with a view to the tower.

The Palestine Archaeological Museum opened to the public on January 13, 1938. The museum's opening was overshadowed by the murder of British archaeologist James Leslie Starkey by local Arabs.

Until the final days of the Mandate period, the museum was administered by the British Palestine Government. On 1 April 1948, it was closed to the public.

=== Jordanian period (1948–1967) ===
On 20 April 1948, the High Commissioner appointed a council of international trustees to administer the museum. The council consisted of twelve members: two representing the High Commissioner, one from the British Academy, one from the British Museum, one from the French National Academy, one from the French Ministry of Foreign Affairs, two from the Antiquities Departments of the Egyptian, Syrian, Lebanese, Iraqi or Transjordanian governments; one from the Hebrew University of Jerusalem, one from the Royal Swedish Academy, one from the American Institute of Archaeology, and one from the American School of Oriental Research in Jerusalem. The board ran the museum until 1966. In the 1950s, controversies arose about objects removed both to Amman and to the Israeli side.

After the 1948 Arab–Israeli War, the museum also became a secondary headquarters of the Jordanian Department of Antiquities, headed by Gerald Lankester Harding until 1956. In 1966, the museum was nationalized by King Hussein during the Jordanian annexation of the West Bank.

=== Israeli period (since 1967) ===
Seven months later, when the 1967 Six-Day War broke out, the museum was captured by an Israeli paratroop brigade. Its hexagonal tower was used as a lookout. Fierce fighting took place here between Israeli and Jordanian forces, culminating in an Israeli victory. The Museum was then officially renamed as the Rockefeller Museum.

The Museum's most prized collection, the ancient Dead Sea Scrolls, were moved by Israel from the Museum to the Israel Museum, in West Jerusalem, with the ownership of the scrolls having been heavily contested ever since. Part of the scrolls, including the Copper Scroll, had been taken to the Jordan Museum in Amman.

Since 1967, the museum has been jointly managed by the Israel Museum and the Israel Department of Antiquities and Museums (later reorganized as the Israel Antiquities Authority).

== Collections ==
The museum's first curator was John H. Iliffe, who arranged the artifacts in chronological order, from two million years ago to 1700 AD. Among the museum's prized possessions are 8th-century wooden panels from the Jami Al-Aqsa and 12th-century (Crusader-period) marble lintels from the Church of the Holy Sepulchre. Most of the collection consists of finds from the 1920s and 1930s. On display are artifacts unearthed in Jerusalem, Megiddo, Ashkelon, Lachish, Sebastia, and Jericho. One of the Lachish letters is on permanent display at the museum, as are the statuary and stucco decorations from the Umayyad Hisham's Palace.

Upon their discovery at Qumran between 1947 and 1956, the ancient Dead Sea Scrolls were housed in the Rockefeller Museum. In 1967, following the Israeli capture of East Jerusalem, Israel relocated the scrolls to the Shrine of the Book, a specially designed building on the grounds of the Israel Museum, in West Jerusalem, with the ownership of these scrolls having been heavily contested ever since. Part of the scrolls, including the Copper Scroll, had been taken to the Jordan Museum in Amman.

Currently, the Rockefeller Museum holds thousands of artifacts ranging from prehistoric times to the Ottoman period. It includes the largest of the Beisan steles (considered "the most impressive find from Egypt's rule over Canaan") a 9,000-year-old statue from Jericho (one of the oldest representations of a human figure ever found), as well as gold jewelry from the Bronze Age.

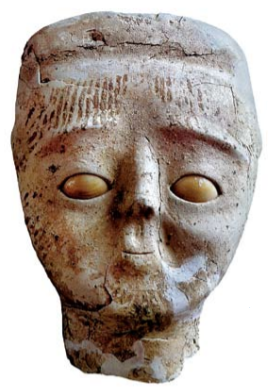
Head of a statue found in Jericho, among the earliest human representations ever found, dating back to 9,000 years ago

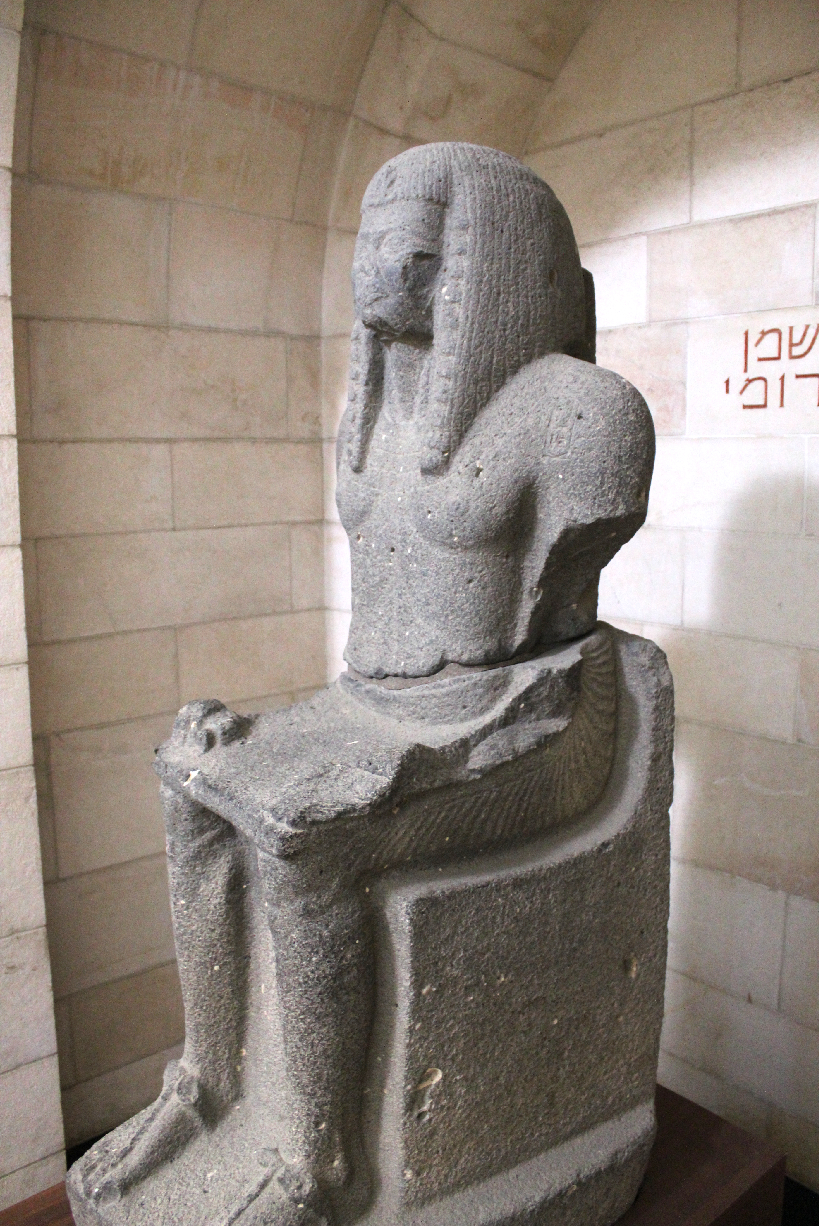
Statue of Ramesses III from Beth Shean, 1185–1153 BCE

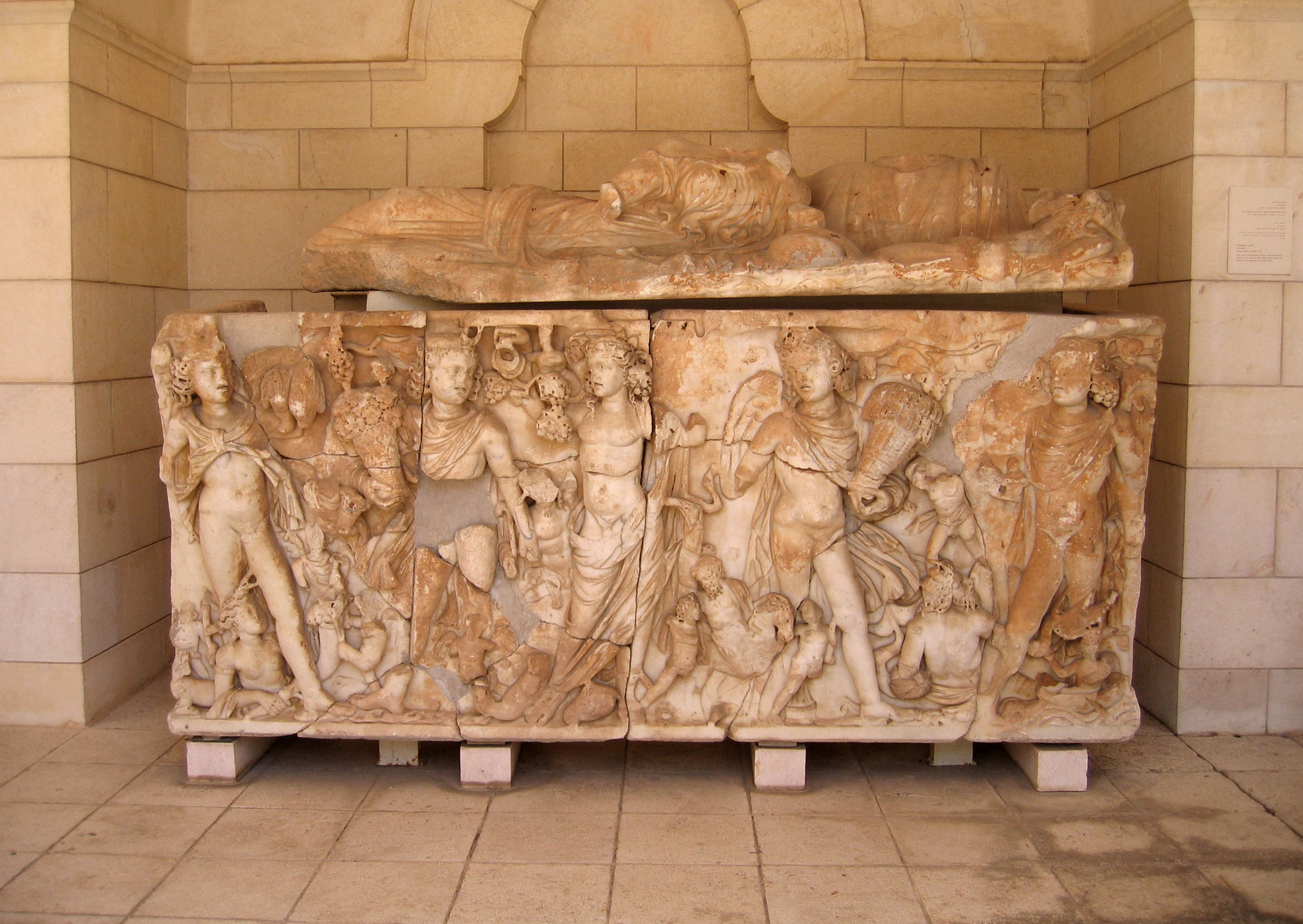
Sarcophagus from Tel Turmus, 3nd century CE, with Dionysos between the seasons of the year. The lid bears the images of the deceased and his wife.

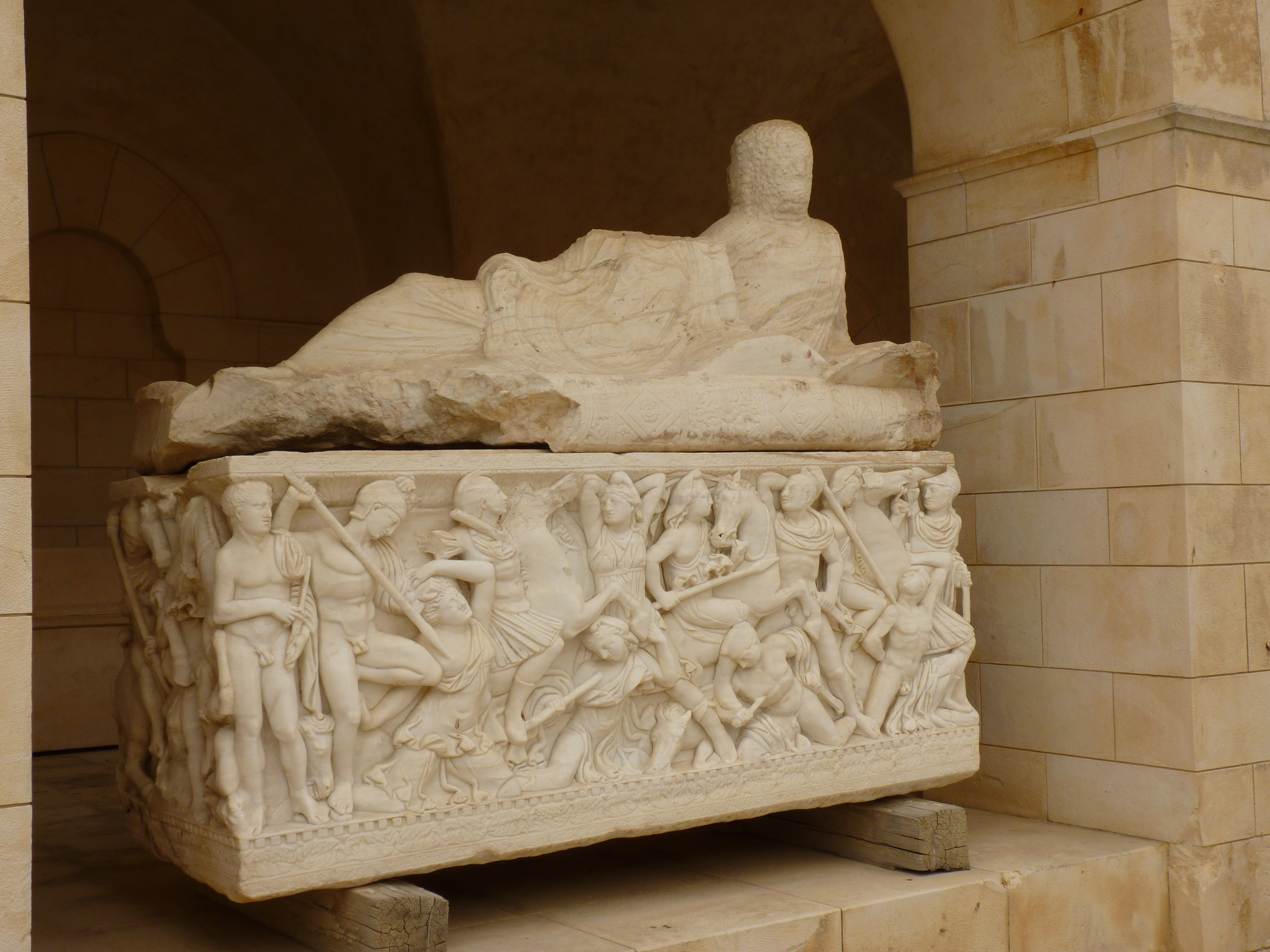
Amazon sarcophagus, Tel Mevorah, Roman period, early 3rd century CE; depicts battle between Amazons and Greeks

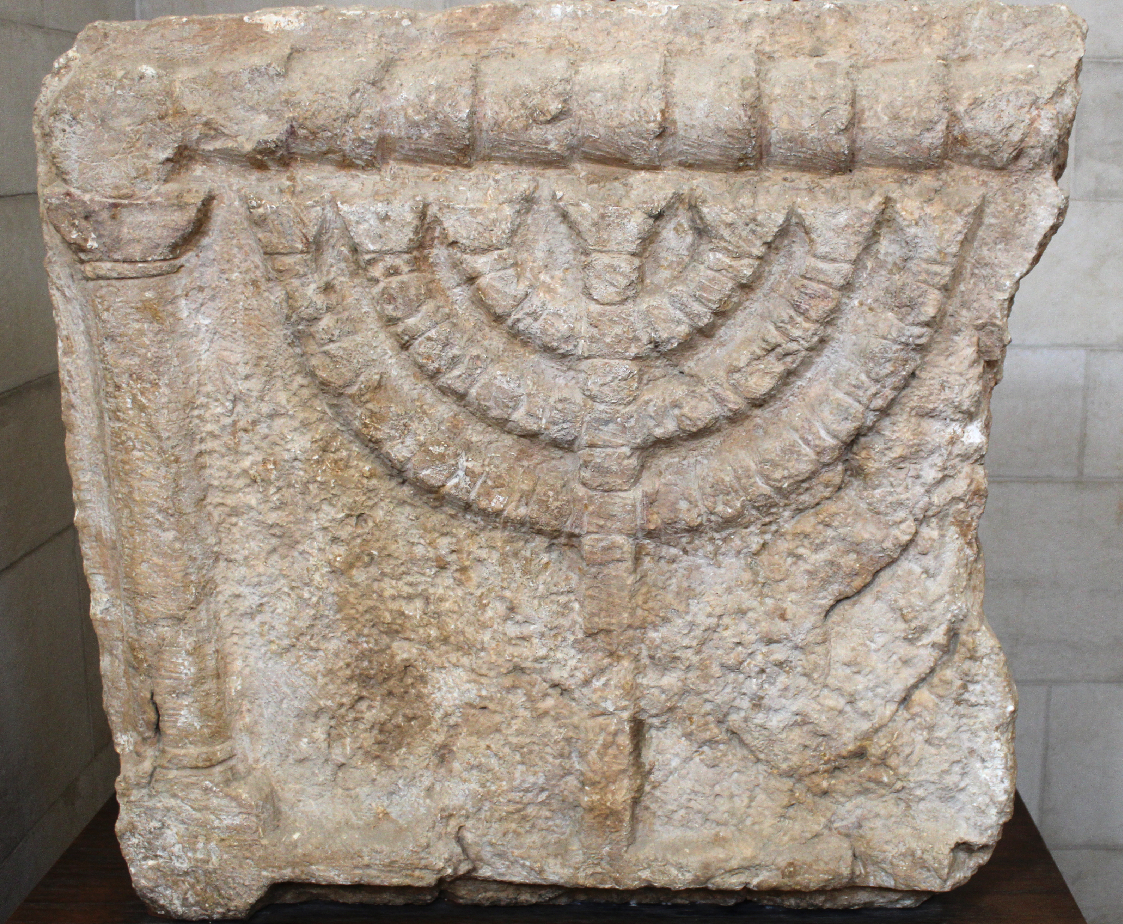
Seven-branched menorah, from the Eshtemoa synagogue, 4th–5th century CE

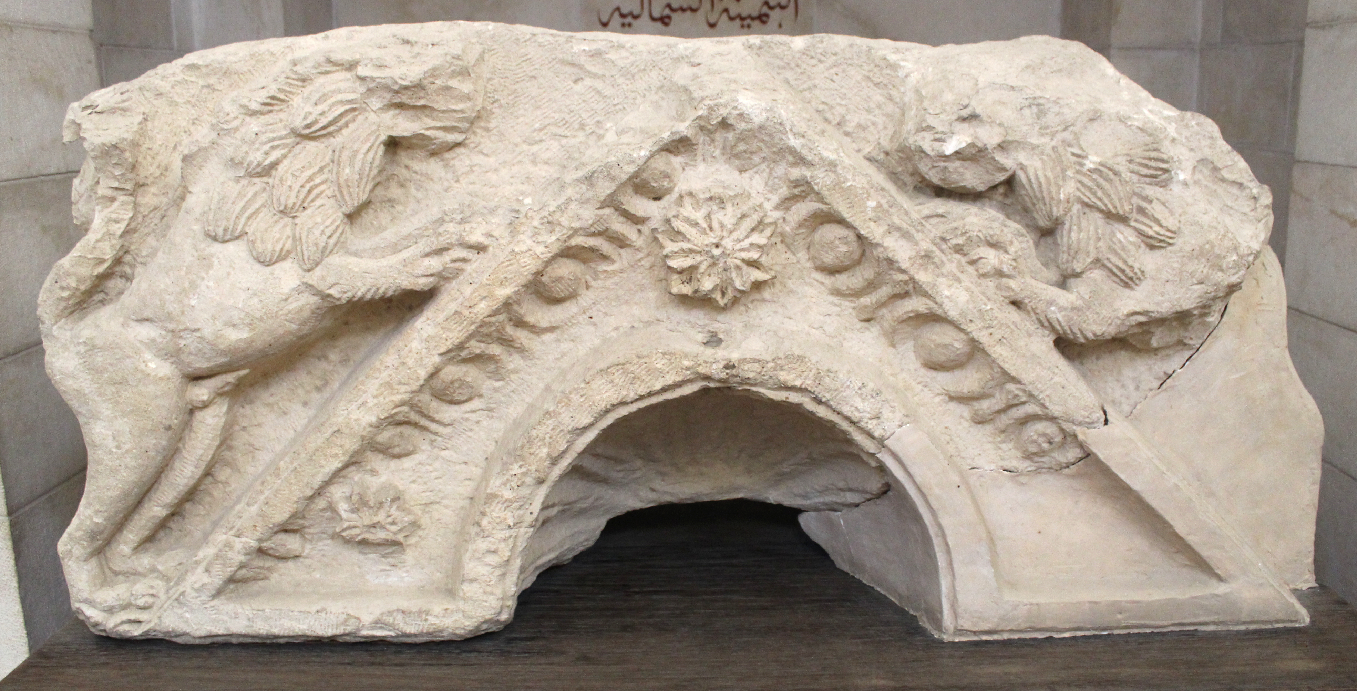
Torah Ark lintel from the Nabratein Synagogue, 3rd century CE

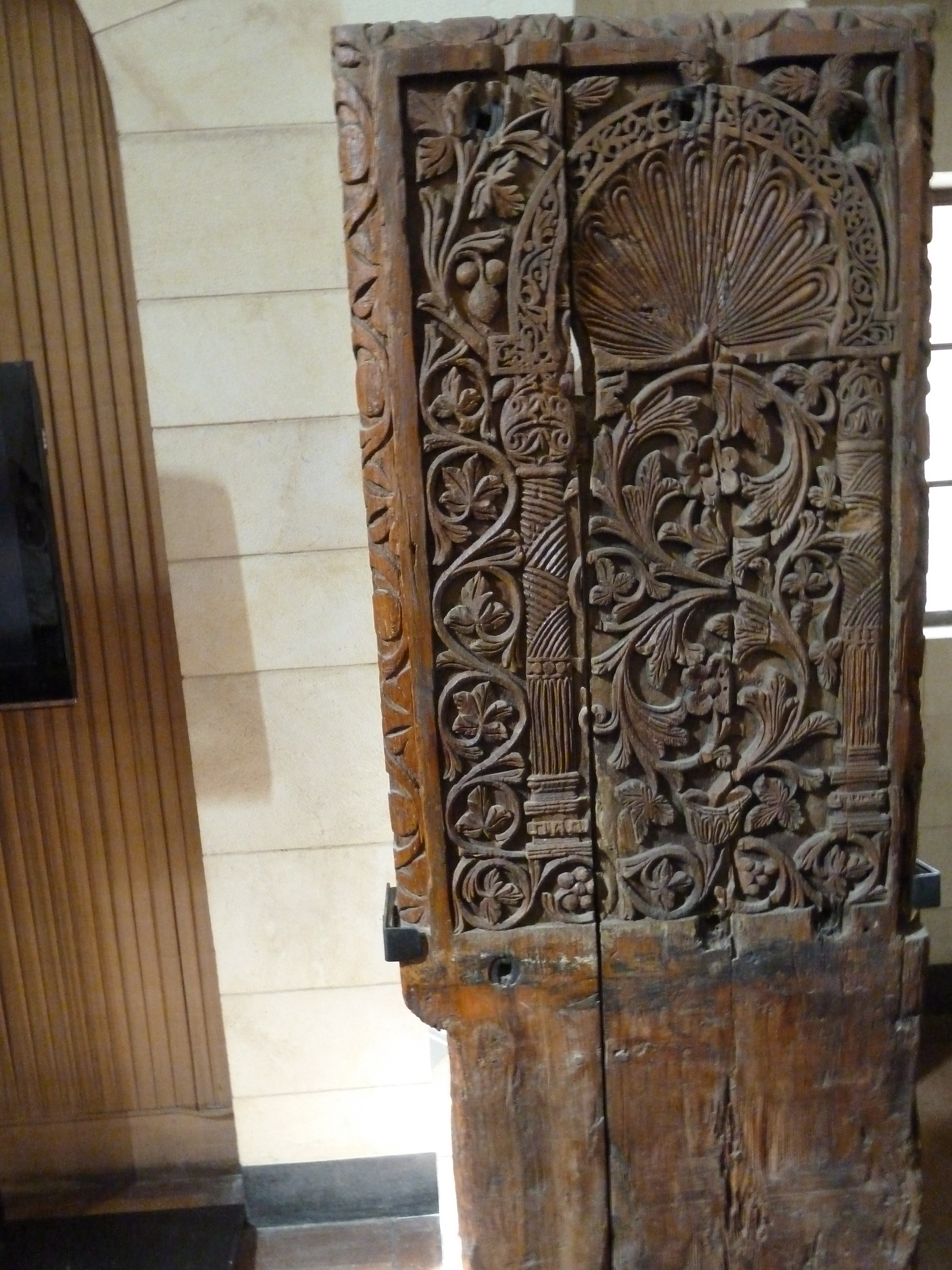
Wood panels from the Jami Al-Aqsa, 8th-century CE

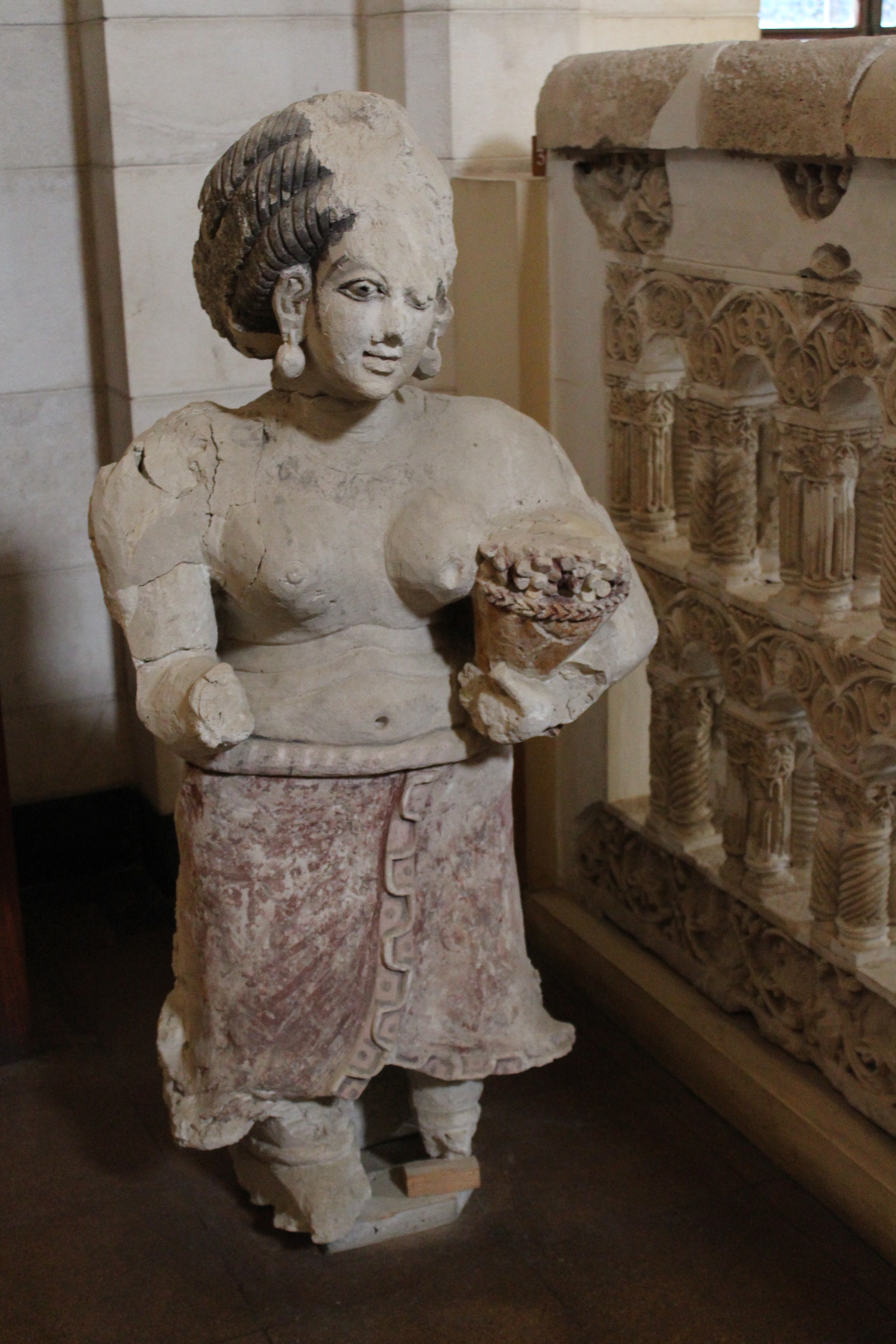
Sem-nude female statue from Hisham's Palace, 8th-century CE

== Exhibitions ==
The museum regularly hosts special exhibitions, such as the 2019/2021 exhibition of Armenian ceramics in Jerusalem. This year-long exhibition, titled “A Glimpse of Paradise,” was organized in collaboration with Yad Ben Zvi, the Ministry of Jerusalem and Heritage, the East Jerusalem Development Company, and the Armenian Patriarchate of Jerusalem.

== Ancient pine tree ==
Inside what was to have been the rear courtyard of the museum stood (until it died after nearly 300 years in 1998) one of the oldest pine trees in the country. According to Arab legend, on the site of this pine tree, Ezra the Scribe sat and wrote the Torah for Israel. The stump may still be seen behind the museum.
